= Elections in Yugoslavia =

Elections were held on municipal, provincial, republican and federal levels in Yugoslavia from its foundation in 1918 throughout its breakup in 1992.

== History ==
=== Interwar period (1918 to 1941) ===
First elections in the Kingdom were for the Provisional Popular Legislature of Serbs, Croats and Slovenes (these were preceded by local elections of National Councils in former Austria-Hungary, including the elections in Vojvodina and Montenegro for local parliaments). Parliamentary elections were held in 1920, 1923, 1925 and 1927, while with the new constitution a de facto Lower and Upper House were introduced in 1931 (the Senate next to the National Assembly). The 1931 elections were not free, as they were handled under a single-course dictatorship, while the 1935 and 1938 were held under limited basic democratic principles.

=== Post-World War II (1945 to 1974) ===
The country was occupied and broken up by the Axis powers in 1941. After the war, the first, 1945 parliamentary election was held between two political options – the Communist Party of Yugoslavia-dominated People's Front, which was a coalition of nearly all major pre-war parties, and its opposition. This was the first time that Yugoslavia introduced women's right to vote. Having run nearly unopposed in that election, CPY promulgated a new Constitution in 1946 that abolished the monarchy and transformed the country into a federal republic. The Communist Party henceforth consolidated its power, ended multi-party elections, and established a one-party state.

Candidates in subsequent elections were proposed only by the People's Front of Yugoslavia as formally non-partisan candidates. Originally, only one candidate was proposed to the electorate. The second parliamentary election in the FPRY was held in 1950. A new Federal Electoral Law was introduced on September 9, 1953, and it defined electoral units, the number of deputies in individual republics' parliaments, the candidate requirements (excluding party affiliation), etc. The number of candidates proposed to the electorate was also permitted to exceed one, allowing for competitive elections. This kind of elections were held in 1953, 1958, 1963, 1969, 1974, 1978, 1982, 1986, and 1989.

=== Decentralisation (1974 to 1990) ===
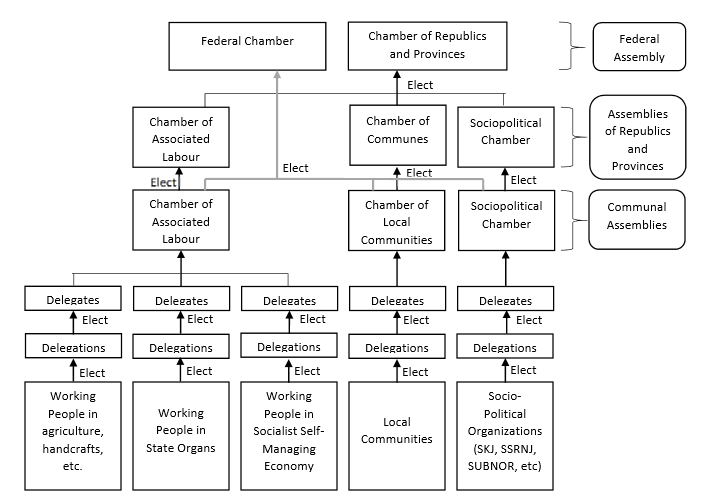
Diagram showing the Yugoslav electoral system from 1974 to 1990

From 1974 to the dissolution of the country from 1990 to 1992, the Assembly was bicameral and was made up of a Federal Council and a Republican Council elected to four-year terms.

The Federal Council was elected by a complicated indirect delegate system through the popular front Socialist Alliance of Working People of Yugoslavia. The Federal Council was composed of 220 members. Its members were elected from the six republics (with 30 members each) and the two autonomous provinces (with 20 members each).

The Republican Council was composed of 88 members. Its members were elected from the six republics' assemblies (with 12 members each) and the two autonomous provinces' assemblies (with 8 members each). The deputies would then serve double mandates in their own assemblies and the Republican Council.

After elections an initial joint session of both councils of the Assembly would vote in a new Federal Executive Council, which also functioned on a four-year term.

Regular federal elections set for 1990 were never held before the country dissolved. Over the course of 1990 each constituent republic adopted democratic constitutions which allowed for political parties other than the League of Communists, and subsequently held multi-party elections. Due to the complicated political system, a new democratic electoral system could not be agreed upon by the Presidency (representing the republics, some of which were openly campaigning for independence and whose interest in Yugoslav reform was moot), the Executive Council (which had dissenting internal opinion about reform), and the Assembly itself which was made up of the old communist cadre.

Year	Federal Council	Republican Council	Federal Presidency	Federal Executive Council	Central Committee CPY/LCY
1974	16 March-29 April	-10 May	15 May	15 May	27–30 May (X)
1978	10 March-29 April	-10 May		15 May	20–23 June (XI)
1979			15 May		
1982	10 March-21 April	-10 May		15 May	26–29 June (XII)
1984			15 May		
1986	10 March-21 April	-10 May		15 May	25–28 June (XIII)
1989			15 May	16 March	
1990	Not held	Not held			20-22 January (XIV)

=== Breakup of Yugoslavia and aftermath ===
With the fall of communism, a multi-party system was reintroduced in 1990. These were held in each of the constituent republics:

- 1990 Bosnian municipal elections
- 1990 Bosnian general election (18 November and 2 December)
- 1990 Croatian parliamentary election (22 April and 6 May)
- 1990 Macedonian parliamentary election (11 and 25 November)
- 1990 Montenegrin municipal elections
- 1990 Montenegrin general election (9 December)
- 1990 Serbian general election (9 and 23 December)
- 1990 Slovenian parliamentary election (8 and 12 April)
- 1990 Slovenian presidential election (8 April)

According to results, support for the former member parties of the League of Communists of Yugoslavia on the federal level at that point was between 35 and 40%.

Serbia and Montenegro remained together after the breakup of Yugoslavia and kept its name until 2003, with the last remnant of Yugoslavia ending upon Montenegro's independence in 2006.

== See also ==
- Elections in Bosnia and Herzegovina
- Elections in Croatia
- Elections in Kosovo
- Elections in Montenegro
- Elections in North Macedonia
- Elections in Serbia
- Elections in Slovenia
- List of mayors of Zagreb
- Mayor of Belgrade
