= 1982 Yugoslavian parliamentary election =

← 1978	10 March–10 May 1982	1986 →

All 220 seats in the Federal Chamber All 88 seats in the Chamber of Republics and Provinces
	First party
Leader	Dušan Dragosavac
Party	SKJ
Alliance	SSRNJ
Seats won	220
Prime Minister before election
Veselin Đuranović
SKJ
Prime Minister after election
Milka Planinc
SKJ

Parliamentary elections were held in Yugoslavia between 10 March and 10 May 1982 through a complicated delegate system which selected delegates to local, republic, and federal assemblies.

== Background ==
The elections were the third held under the 1974 Yugoslav Constitution, approved on 31 January 1974, which established a bicameral Assembly with a Federal Chamber of 220 members and a Chamber of Republics and Provinces of 88 members.

== Electoral system ==
The members of the Federal Chamber represented three groups: self-managing organizations, communities and socio-political organizations. 30 members were elected for the six republics and 20 for the two autonomous provinces, Kosovo and Vojvodina.

== Elections ==
The Federal Council was elected between 10 March and 21 April, and the Chamber of Republics and Provinces on 10 May. The Federal Executive Council was elected on 15 May, with Milka Planinc as its President (Prime Minister), becoming Yugoslavia's first female head of government. The Central Committee of the League of Communists of Yugoslavia was elected between 26 and 29 June, with Mitja Ribičič as the President.
