= Dragomir Dragan Tomić =

Dragomir Tomić (Serbian Cyrillic: Драгомир Томић; born 5 October 1937), better known as Dragan Tomić (Serbian Cyrillic: Драган Томић), is a Serbian retired entrepreneur and politician. He oversaw the company SIMPO from 1967 to 2015 and in the process became one of Serbia's best known business leaders. He also held high political office in the Socialist Federal Republic of Yugoslavia, the Federal Republic of Yugoslavia, and the Republic of Serbia.

He is not to be confused with a different Dragan Tomić who served as president of the Serbian parliament from 1994 to 2001 and was Serbia's interim president in 1997.

== Early life ==
Tomić was born in the village of Žbevac, near the town of Bujanovac, in what was then the Vardar Banovina of the Kingdom of Yugoslavia. He finished elementary school in Bujanovac and high school in Vranje and afterward worked in the latter community's directorate for investments and development. He later graduated from the University of Skopje Faculty of Economics, in what was then the People's Republic of Macedonia in the Federal People's Republic of Yugoslavia, earning his degree in only two and a half years.

== Entrepreneur ==
Tomić began working at the Vranje-based furniture company Sima Pogačarević soon after its founding in 1963. In 1967, he was promoted from director of planning and analysis to the position of general manager. At the time, the company had four hundred employees and was facing bankruptcy; under Tomić, it was re-established under the name SIMPO and expanded its operations dramatically, becoming known for several years as one of Serbia's leading financial success stories. Soon after his appointment, Tomić said that the company would move away from products for which there was only a minimal demand, instead producing a smaller assortment of goods in larger batches.

Financially supported by the Yugoslavian government in these years, SIMPO also benefitted from the United States Congress granting "most favoured nation" status to Yugoslavia in the 1970s, which allowed the company to export its furniture to America. In the 1990s, SIMPO expanded its operations to include confectionary and detergent production, water bottling, food retailing and other initiatives; the company also had some success in resisting the international sanctions against Yugoslavia during the Yugoslav Wars, shifting the focus of its exports from west to east.

According to Tomić's corporate biography, SIMPO had grown by 2002 into a powerful business concern with a value of approximately eighty billion Euros, responsible for employing 6,500 people. He described the company's success as predicated on a philosophy of promoting small businesses (i.e., to produce semi-finished products for big industry) and investment in the population of southern Serbia, an area with comparatively high levels of unemployment.

One of SIMPO's most prominent international partnerships under Tomić's leadership was a 2010 arrangement to sell its products in Russia though IKEA's retail chain.

The company's financial success began to decline in the 2010s, and in 2013 Aleksandar Vučić was reported to have been the deciding voice in the Serbian government's decision to stop supporting the company. Several of Tomić's corporate allies were removed from office by general director Slađan Disić in December 2014, and Tomić himself resigned from SIMPO early in the following year.

== Politician ==
=== Socialist Federal Republic of Yugoslavia ===
The Socialist Federal Republic of Yugoslavia was a one-party socialist state. Tomić was included on the sole declared electoral list for the Socialist Republic of Serbia's delegates the Yugoslavian parliament's Federal Chamber in the 1974 Yugoslavian parliamentary election; formally, he was a representative of the Municipal Council of the Union of Trade Unions for Vranje and the surrounding communities. Inclusion on the list was tantamount to election: although the list's publication was preceded by several nomination meetings throughout the country (which provided for a degree of social and popular participation in the outcome), the list itself had the same number of candidates as there were available seats. In November 1975, Tomić took part in an official delegation of the Federal Chamber to the Union of Soviet Socialist Republics (USSR).

He appeared on the list of Serbia's delegates for the Federal Chamber a second time in the 1978 Yugoslavian parliamentary election; as before, this was tantamount to election. He was not a candidate for re-election in 1982.

Tomić was elected to the Central Committee on the League of Communists of Serbia (CK SKS) for the 1982–86 term and was a member of the Serbian parliament's social oversight committee in the same period. In a 1983 debate, he argued against providing funds to companies that had proven unprofitable over extended periods of time.

In 1986, Tomić was nominated by the SKS to the Central Committee of the League of Communists of Yugoslavia (CK SKJ). He served in this role for the next four years, while also continuing to serve on the Central Committee at the republic level in Serbia. A prominent member of the federal committee, he argued for economic reforms and a better standard of living for Yugoslavia's workers.

The League of Communists of Serbia experienced a serious division in September 1987, when Slobodan Milošević arranged for the dismissal from office of Dragiša Pavlović, a key ally of Serbian president Ivan Stambolić. Stambolić's standing in the party was damaged by the affair, and he resigned from office later in the year; Milošević would subsequently consolidate his power base and become the most powerful politician in Serbia. Tomić was close to Stambolić at the time of the division and unsuccessfully sought to be a conciliator between the two principals; he also recommended that delegates abstain from voting on Pavlović's removal. The last public gathering of Stambolić and his most prominent allies took place in this period at the opening of a SIMPO department store in Belgrade.

Tomić was not re-nominated as a Serbian delegate to the CK SKJ in December 1989, and his term ended in 1990, by which time the party was on the verge of collapse. In mid-1990, the SKS merged with the Serbia's Socialist Alliance of Working People (SSRN) to form the Socialist Party of Serbia (SPS), and Tomić became a member of the new party. In the same year, multi-party politics was formally reintroduced to Serbia. Over the next decade, the SPS was the dominant party in the country under Slobodan Milošević's authoritarian leadership.

=== Federal Republic of Yugoslavia/Republic of Serbia ===
==== The Milošević Years ====
The Socialist Federal Republic of Yugoslavia officially ceased to exist in 1992. In that year, the republics of Serbia and Montenegro established a new federation known as the Federal Republic of Yugoslavia.

Tomić was not a candidate for the new federation's Chamber of Citizens in its first parliamentary election in May 1992. (Note: The "Dragan Tomic" who later served as president of the Serbian parliament was, however, elected to the Yugoslavian assembly's Chamber of Citizens in May 1992.) In the December 1992 parliamentary election, he appeared in the second position on Socialist Party's list for the Leskovac constituency, after Ivica Dačić, and was elected when the list won seven of the eleven available seats.

On 18 March 1994, Tomić was appointed as a minister without portfolio in the Serbian government with responsibility for the implementation of the new economic program.

The Socialist Party contested the 1996 Yugoslavian parliamentary election in an alliance with the Yugoslav Left (JUL) and New Democracy (ND). The electoral map was redrawn prior to the vote, with Serbia's nine previous electoral divisions restructured into twenty-nine smaller constituencies. Tomić was nominated by the SPS municipal board in Vranje to lead the alliance's electoral list in that division, and he was re-elected when the list won three out of four available seats.

Following the 1997 Serbian parliamentary election, the SPS formed a new coalition government with the Serbian Radical Party (SRS) and the JUL. The ministry had five deputy prime ministers: two each from the SPS and SPS, and one from the JUL. Tomić was appointed as one of the SPS representatives in this role, officially taking office on 24 March 1998. As before, his responsibilities were in the area of economy. Tomić later maintained that he acted as a financial specialist or technical expert, rather than a political functionary, during his time in government, and that his responsibility was to coordinate the country's economy during the time of sanctions.

==== The Fall of Milošević and after ====
Slobodan Milošević fell from power in October 2000, after losing the 2000 Yugoslavian presidential election to opposition candidate Vojislav Koštunica. This was a watershed moment in Serbian and Yugoslavian politics. Serbia's government fell in the aftermath of the Yugoslavian vote, and Tomić's term as deputy prime minister ended on 24 October 2000.

Tomić led a combined SPS–JUL electoral list for Vranje in the 2000 Yugoslavian parliamentary election, which took place concurrently with the presidential vote. He was re-elected when the list won six out of nine available seats. Due to a delay in certifying the results for the division, he was not officially given a new assembly mandate until 3 November 2000. For the first time in his political career, Tomić served as an opposition member in the sitting of the federal parliament that followed.

The Federal Republic of Yugoslavia was reconstituted as the State Union of Serbia and Montenegro on 4 February 2003. The country had a unicameral legislature, the first members of which were chosen by indirect election from the republican parliaments of Serbia and Montenegro. Only members of the republican parliaments and members of the former Yugoslavian parliament at the time of its dissolution were eligible to serve. By virtue of its standing in the Serbian parliament, the SPS had the ability to appoint twelve members of the new federal assembly. Tomić was included in the party's delegation. His term ended in February 2004, and he did not seek a return to political life after this time.
