= Prime Minister of Yugoslavia =

Head of government of the Yugoslav state

- Премијер Југославије; Premijer Jugoslavije
- Standard of the Prime Minister (SFR Yugoslavia)

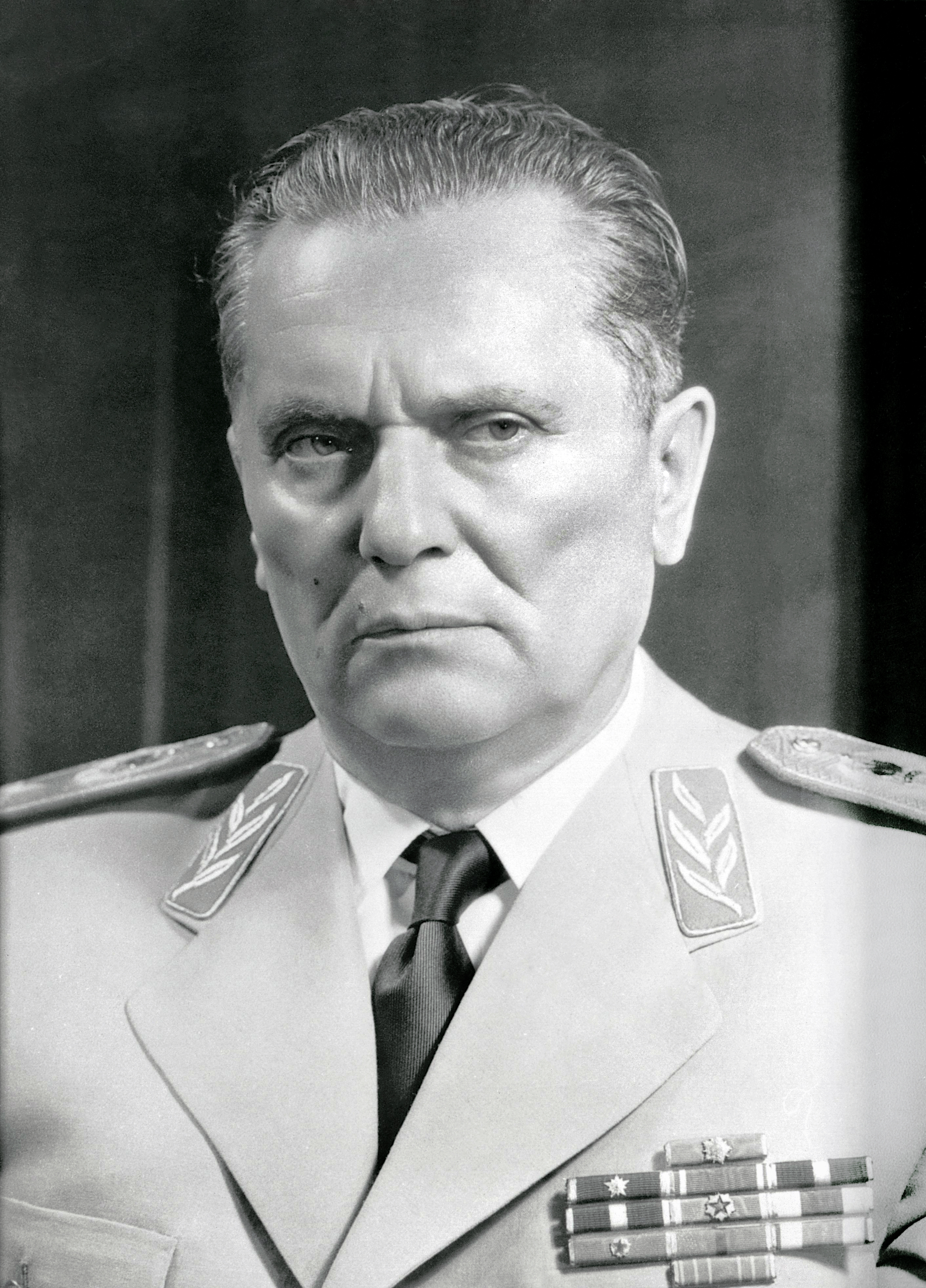
- Longest serving Josip Broz Tito; 7 March 1945 – 29 June 1963
- Government of Yugoslavia
- Member of: Parliament of Yugoslavia
- Reports to: King of Yugoslavia (Serbs, Croats and Slovenes) (1918–1945); Federal Assembly of Yugoslavia (1945–1992)
- Seat: Belgrade, Serbia
- Nominator: King of Yugoslavia (Serbs, Croats and Slovenes) (1918–1945); Central Committee of the League of Communists of Yugoslavia (1945–1963); President of Yugoslavia (1963–1980); Presidency of Yugoslavia (1980–1992)
- Appointer: Parliament of Yugoslavia
- Precursor: Prime Minister of Serbia; President of the National Council of Slovenes, Croats and Serbs
- Formation: 1 December 1918; 107 years ago
- First holder: Stojan Protić
- Final holder: Ante Marković
- Abolished: 14 July 1992; 34 years ago
- Superseded by: Prime Minister of Bosnia and Herzegovina; Prime Minister of Croatia; Prime Minister of North Macedonia; Prime Minister of Serbia and Montenegro; Prime Minister of Slovenia
- Deputy: Deputy Prime Minister of Yugoslavia

The prime minister of Yugoslavia (Serbo-Croatian: Премијер Југославије, Premijer Jugoslavije) was the head of government of the Yugoslav state, from the creation of the Kingdom of Serbs, Croats and Slovenes in 1918 until the breakup of the Socialist Federal Republic of Yugoslavia in 1992.

== History ==
=== Kingdom of Yugoslavia ===
The Kingdom of Serbs, Croats and Slovenes was created by the unification of the Kingdom of Serbia (Montenegro had united with Serbia five days previously, while the regions of Kosovo and Metohija, Baranya, Syrmia, Banat, Bačka and Vardar Macedonia were parts of Serbia prior to the unification) and the provisional State of Slovenes, Croats and Serbs (itself formed from territories of the former Austria-Hungary) on 1 December 1918.

Until 6 January 1929, the Kingdom of Serbs, Croats and Slovenes was a parliamentary monarchy. On that day, King Alexander I abolished the Vidovdan Constitution (adopted in 1921), prorogued the National Assembly and introduced a personal dictatorship (so-called 6 January Dictatorship). He renamed the country Kingdom of Yugoslavia on 3 October 1929, and although introduced the 1931 Constitution, he continued to rule as a de facto absolute monarch until his assassination on 9 October 1934, during a state visit to France. After his assassination, parliamentary monarchy was put back in place.

The Kingdom of Yugoslavia was defeated and occupied on 17 April 1941 after the German invasion. The monarchy was formally abolished and the republic proclaimed on 29 November 1945.

=== SFR Yugoslavia ===
After the German invasion and fragmentation of the Kingdom of Yugoslavia, the Partisan resistance in occupied Yugoslavia formed a deliberative council, the Anti-Fascist Council of National Liberation of Yugoslavia (AVNOJ) in 1942. On 29 November 1943 the AVNOJ proclaimed the Democratic Federal Yugoslavia, and appointed the National Committee for the Liberation of Yugoslavia (NKOJ), led by Prime Minister Josip Broz Tito, as its government. Josip Broz Tito was quickly recognized by the Allies at the Tehran Conference, and the royalist government-in-exile in London was pressured into agreeing on a merge with the NKOJ. In order to facilitate this, Ivan Šubašić was appointed by the King to head the London government.

For a period, Yugoslavia had two recognized prime ministers and governments (which both agreed to formally merge as soon as possible): Josip Broz Tito leading the NKOJ in occupied Yugoslavia, and Ivan Šubašić leading the King's government-in-exile in London. With the Tito-Šubašić Agreement in 1944, the two prime ministers agreed that the new joint government would be led by Tito. After the liberation of Yugoslavia's capital Belgrade in October 1944, the joint government was officially formed on 7 March 1945, with Josip Broz Tito as the prime minister.

After the war, elections were held ending in an overwhelming victory for Tito's People's Front. The new parliament deposed King Peter II on 29 November 1945, and declared the Federative People's Republic of Yugoslavia (in 1963, the state was renamed Socialist Federal Republic of Yugoslavia). The government was first headed by a prime minister up to 14 January 1953, when major decentralization reforms reorganized the government into the Federal Executive Council chaired by a President, who was still usually called "Prime Minister" in non-Yugoslav sources; constitutionally, the post was indistinguishable from the new office of President of the Republic, the latter of which would be held exclusively by Tito. In 1963, the President of the Federal Executive Council and the President of the Republic became separate posts, with the individual presidency replaced by a collective presidency in 1971, though in practice the individual presidency survived until Tito's death in 1980.

Five out of nine heads of government of Yugoslavia in this period were of Croatian ethnicity. Three were from Croatia itself (Josip Broz Tito, Mika Špiljak, and Milka Planinc), while two were Bosnian Croats (Branko Mikulić and Ante Marković). Ante Marković however, though a Croat from Bosnia and Herzegovina by birth, was a politician of Croatia like Špiljak and Planinc, serving (at different times) as both prime minister and president of the presidency of that federal unit.

== List ==
People's Radical Party
Democratic Party
Slovene People's Party
Yugoslav Radical Peasants' Democracy / Yugoslav National Party
Yugoslav Radical Union
Croatian Peasant Party
Communist Party of Yugoslavia / League of Communists of Yugoslavia
Union of Reform Forces of Yugoslavia
Socialist Party of Serbia
Independent
Denotes an acting prime minister

| No. | Portrait | Name (Birth–Death) | Nationality | Term of office | | | Party | Election | Cabinet | Notes |
| No. | Portrait | Name (Birth–Death) | Nationality | Took office | Left office | Time in office | Party | Election | Cabinet | Notes |
|---|---|---|---|---|---|---|---|---|---|---|
In the Kingdom of Yugoslavia
| – | | Nikola Pašić; Никола Пашић (1845–1926) | Serb | 1 December 1918 | 22 December 1918 | 21 days | People's Radical Party | – | Pašić XII | Acting prime minister, as the last prime minister of Serbia. |
| 1 | | Stojan Protić; Стојан Протић (1857–1923) | Serb | 22 December 1918 | 16 August 1919 | 237 days | People's Radical Party | – | Protić I | First Prime Minister of the Kingdom of Serbs, Croats and Slovenes (that will be renamed to "Yugoslavia"). |
| 2 | | Ljubomir Davidović; Љубомир Давидовић (1863–1940) | Serb | 16 August 1919 | 19 February 1920 | 187 days | Democratic Party | – | Davidović I | |
| (1) | | Stojan Protić; Стојан Протић (1857–1923) | Serb | 19 February 1920 | 16 May 1920 | 87 days | People's Radical Party | – | Protić II | |
| 3 | | Milenko Vesnić; Миленко Веснић (1863–1921) | Serb | 16 May 1920 | 1 January 1921 | 230 days | People's Radical Party | 1920 | Vesnić | |
| 4 | | Nikola Pašić; Никола Пашић (1845–1926) | Serb | 1 January 1921 | 28 July 1924 | 3 years, 209 days | People's Radical Party | 1923 | Pašić XIII–XIV–XV–XVI–XVII–XVIII–XIX | Second term. Vidovdan Constitution adopted on 28 June 1921. |
| (2) | | Ljubomir Davidović; Љубомир Давидовић (1863–1940) | Serb | 28 July 1924 | 6 November 1924 | 101 days | Democratic Party | – | Davidović II | Second term |
| (4) | | Nikola Pašić; Никола Пашић (1845–1926) | Serb | 6 November 1924 | 8 April 1926 | 1 year, 153 days | People's Radical Party | 1925 | Pašić XX–XXI–XXII | Third term |
| 5 | | Nikola Uzunović; Никола Узуновић (1873–1954) | Serb | 8 April 1926 | 17 April 1927 | 1 year, 9 days | People's Radical Party | – | Uzunović I–II | |
| 6 | | Velimir Vukićević; Велимир Вукићевић (1871–1930) | Serb | 17 April 1927 | 28 July 1928 | 1 year, 102 days | People's Radical Party | 1927 | Vukićević I–II | Resigned after assassination attempt on opposition leader Stjepan Radić in the Parliament. |
| 7 | | Anton Korošec; Антон Корошец (1872–1940) | Slovene | 28 July 1928 | 7 January 1929 | 163 days | Slovene People's Party | – | Korošec | Dismissed when the 6 January Dictatorship was proclaimed. |
| 8 | | Petar Živković; Петар Живковић (1879–1947) | Serb | 7 January 1929 | 4 April 1932 | 3 years, 88 days | Yugoslav Radical Peasants' Democracy | 1931 | Živković | Prime Minister during the 6 January Dictatorship. Sentenced to death in absentia in 1946. |
| 9 | | Vojislav Marinković; Војислав Маринковић (1876–1935) | Serb | 4 April 1932 | 3 July 1932 | 90 days | Yugoslav Radical Peasants' Democracy | – | Marinković | Previously a (founding) member of the Democratic Party. |
| 10 | | Milan Srškić; Милан Сршкић (1880–1937) | Serb | 3 July 1932 | 27 January 1934 | 1 year, 208 days | Yugoslav Radical Peasants' Democracy | – | Srškić I–II | |
| (5) | | Nikola Uzunović; Никола Узуновић (1873–1954) | Serb | 27 January 1934 | 22 December 1934 | 329 days | Yugoslav National Party | – | Uzunović III | The Yugoslav Radical Peasants' Democracy party was renamed into the Yugoslav National Party. |
| 11 | | Bogoljub Jevtić; Богољуб Јевтић (1886–1960) | Serb | 22 December 1934 | 24 June 1935 | 184 days | Yugoslav National Party | 1935 | Jevtić | |
| | | Bogoljub Jevtić; Богољуб Јевтић (1886–1960) | Serb | 22 December 1934 | 24 June 1935 | 184 days | Yugoslav Radical Union | 1935 | Jevtić | |
| 12 | | Milan Stojadinović; Милан Стојадиновић (1888–1961) | Serb | 24 June 1935 | 5 February 1939 | 3 years, 226 days | Yugoslav Radical Union | 1938 | Stojadinović I–II–III | |
| 13 | | Dragiša Cvetković; Драгиша Цветковић (1893–1969) | Serb | 5 February 1939 | 27 March 1941 | 2 years, 50 days | Yugoslav Radical Union | – | Cvetković I–II | Sentenced in absentia in 1945. |
In the Yugoslav government-in-exile
| 14 | | Dušan Simović; Душан Симовић (1882–1962) | Serb | 27 March 1941 | 11 January 1942 | 290 days | Independent | – | Simović | Chief of the General Staff of the Royal Yugoslav Army. Took power by military coup d'état. He led government into exile in London. |
| 15 | | Slobodan Jovanović; Слободан Јовановић (1869–1958) | Serb | 11 January 1942 | 26 June 1943 | 1 year, 166 days | Independent | – | Jovanović I-II | Headed government-in-exile. Found guilty of treason in absentia in 1946. |
| 16 | | Miloš Trifunović; Милош Трифуновић (1871–1957) | Serb | 26 June 1943 | 10 August 1943 | 45 days | People's Radical Party | – | Trifunović | Headed government-in-exile |
| 17 | | Božidar Purić; Божидар Пурић (1891–1977) | Serb | 10 August 1943 | 8 July 1944 | 333 days | Independent | – | Purić | Headed government-in-exile |
| 18 | | Ivan Šubašić; Иван Шубашић (1892–1955) | Croat | 8 July 1944 | 7 March 1945 | 242 days | Croatian Peasant Party | – | Šubašić | Headed government-in-exile. Merged into coalition government on March 7, 1945, with Josip Broz Tito presiding. |
In the Democratic Federal Yugoslavia/Socialist Federal Republic of Yugoslavia
| 19 (1) | | Josip Broz Tito; Јосип Броз Тито (1892–1980) | Croat | 7 March 1945 | 29 June 1963 | 18 years, 114 days | Communist Party of Yugoslavia | 1945; 1950; 1953; 1958; 1963 | Tito I–II–III–IV–V–VI | Held post simultaneously (as head of the NKOJ) first with Božidar Purić, then Ivan Šubašić. Headed joint coalition government. |
| 19 (1) | | Josip Broz Tito; Јосип Броз Тито (1892–1980) | Croat | 7 March 1945 | 29 June 1963 | 18 years, 114 days | League of Communists of Yugoslavia | 1945; 1950; 1953; 1958; 1963 | Tito I–II–III–IV–V–VI | Held post simultaneously (as head of the NKOJ) first with Božidar Purić, then Ivan Šubašić. Headed joint coalition government. |
| 20 (2) | | Petar Stambolić; Петар Стамболић (1912–2007) | Serb | 29 June 1963 | 16 May 1967 | 3 years, 321 days | League of Communists of Yugoslavia | – | Stambolić | |
| 21 (3) | | Mika Špiljak; Мика Шпиљак (1916–2007) | Croat | 16 May 1967 | 18 May 1969 | 2 years, 2 days | League of Communists of Yugoslavia | – | Špiljak | |
| 22 (4) | | Mitja Ribičič; Митја Рибичич (1919–2013) | Slovene | 18 May 1969 | 30 July 1971 | 2 years, 73 days | League of Communists of Yugoslavia | 1969 | Ribičič | |
| 23 (5) | | Džemal Bijedić; Џемал Биједић (1917–1977) | Bosniak | 30 July 1971 | 18 January 1977 | 5 years, 172 days | League of Communists of Yugoslavia | 1974 | Bijedić I-II | Killed in a plane crash. |
| 24 (6) | | Veselin Đuranović; Веселин Ђурановић (1925–1997) | Montenegrin | 18 January 1977 | 16 May 1982 | 5 years, 118 days | League of Communists of Yugoslavia | 1978 | Đuranović | |
| 25 (7) | | Milka Planinc; Милка Планинц (1924–2010) | Croat | 16 May 1982 | 15 May 1986 | 3 years, 364 days | League of Communists of Yugoslavia | 1982 | Planinc | First female head of the government. |
| 26 (8) | | Branko Mikulić; Бранко Микулић (1928–1994) | Croat | 15 May 1986 | 16 March 1989 | 2 years, 305 days | League of Communists of Yugoslavia | 1986 | Mikulić | Resigned on 30 December 1988, amid widespread protests. |
| 27 (9) | | Ante Marković; Анте Марковић (1924–2011) | Croat | 16 March 1989 | 20 December 1991 | 2 years, 279 days | League of Communists of Yugoslavia | – | Marković | Last prime minister of Yugoslavia. League of Communists was dissolved in 1990, Marković formed his own party. |
| | | Ante Marković; Анте Марковић (1924–2011) | Croat | 16 March 1989 | 20 December 1991 | 2 years, 279 days | Union of Reform Forces of Yugoslavia | – | Marković | Last prime minister of Yugoslavia. League of Communists was dissolved in 1990, Marković formed his own party. |
| – | | Aleksandar Mitrović; Александар Митровић (1933–2012) | Serb | 20 December 1991 | 14 July 1992 | 207 days | Socialist Party of Serbia | – | Marković | Acting prime minister. Installed by Serbia and Montenegro. |

== See also ==
- Deputy Prime Minister of Yugoslavia
- List of heads of state of Yugoslavia
- Prime Minister of Serbia and Montenegro
- Chairman of the Council of Ministers of Bosnia and Herzegovina
- Prime Minister of Croatia
- Prime Minister of Montenegro
- Prime Minister of North Macedonia
- Prime Minister of Serbia
- Prime Minister of Slovenia
