= 1986 Yugoslavian parliamentary election =

- 10 March–10 May 1986

All 220 seats in the Federal Chamber All 88 seats in the Chamber of Republics and Provinces
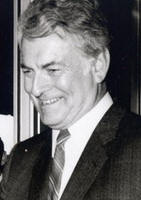
	First party
Leader	Vidoje Žarković
Party	SKJ
Alliance	SSRNJ
Seats won	220
Prime Minister before election
Milka Planinc
SKJ
Prime Minister after election
Branko Mikulić
SKJ

Parliamentary elections were held in Yugoslavia between 10 March and 10 May 1986 through a complicated delegate system which selected delegates to local, republic, and federal assemblies.

These were the final parliamentary elections to be held in Yugoslavia as the country started to break up five years later.

== Background ==
The elections were the fourth held under the 1974 Yugoslav Constitution, approved on 31 January 1974, which established a bicameral Assembly with a Federal Chamber of 220 members and a Chamber of Republics and Provinces of 88 members.

== Electoral system ==
The members of the Federal Chamber represented three groups: self-managing organizations, communities and socio-political organizations. 30 members were elected for the six republics and 20 for the two autonomous provinces, Kosovo and Vojvodina.

== Election ==
The Federal Council was elected between 10 March and 21 April, and the Chamber of Republics and Provinces on 10 May. The Federal Executive Council was elected on 15 May, with Branko Mikulić as the President (Prime Minister). The Central Committee of the League of Communists of Yugoslavia was elected between 25 and 28 June, with Milanko Renovica as the President.
