= Branko Mikulić =

Yugoslav politician (1928–1994)

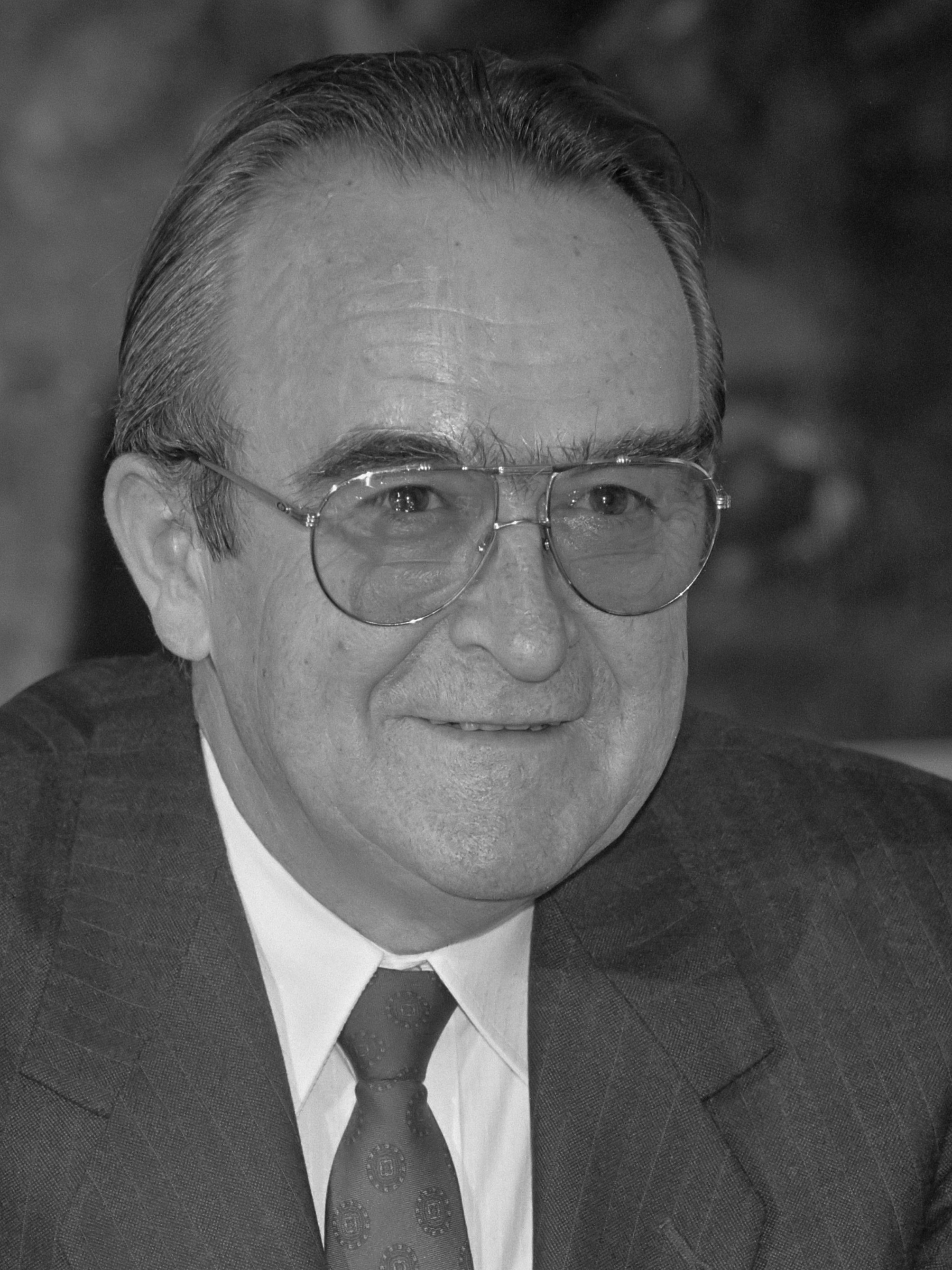
- Mikulić in 1988

26th Prime Minister of Yugoslavia President of the Federal Executive Council
- In office 15 May 1986 – 16 March 1989
- President: Sinan Hasani; Lazar Mojsov; Raif Dizdarević
- Preceded by: Milka Planinc
- Succeeded by: Ante Marković

2nd Member of the Presidency of Yugoslavia for SR Bosnia and Herzegovina
- In office 15 May 1984 – 15 May 1986
- Preceded by: Cvijetin Mijatović
- Succeeded by: Hamdija Pozderac

3rd President of the Presidency of SR Bosnia and Herzegovina
- In office 26 April 1982 – 26 April 1983
- Prime Minister: Seid Maglajlija
- Preceded by: Raif Dizdarević
- Succeeded by: Milanko Renovica

6th President of the Executive Council of SR Bosnia and Herzegovina
- In office 1967–1969
- Preceded by: Rudi Kolak
- Succeeded by: Dragutin Kosovac
Additional positions
3rd President of the League of Communists of Bosnia and Herzegovina
In office 9 April 1969 – 11 May 1978
Preceded by	Cvijetin Mijatović
Succeeded by	Nikola Stojanović

Personal details
- Born: 10 June 1928 Gornji Vakuf, Kingdom of Serbs, Croats and Slovenes
- Died: 12 April 1994 (aged 65) Sarajevo, Bosnia and Herzegovina
- Party: League of Communists
- Education: University of Zagreb

Branko Mikulić (10 June 1928 – 12 April 1994) was a Yugoslav politician who served as Prime Minister of Yugoslavia from 1986 to 1989. Mikulić was one of the leading politicians in Bosnia and Herzegovina during the communist rule in the former Yugoslavia. He was a member of the Presidency of Yugoslavia for SR Bosnia and Herzegovina from 1984 to 1986, and previously served as President of the Presidency of SR Bosnia and Herzegovina from 1982 to 1983.

Mikulić also served as President of the Executive Council of SR Bosnia and Herzegovina from 1967 to 1969. He was President of the League of Communists of Bosnia and Herzegovina from 1969 to 1978 as well.

== Early life and education ==
Mikulić was born to a Bosnian Croat family in 1928 in village Podgrađe, Municipality of Gornji Vakuf, at the time Kingdom of Serbs, Croats and Slovenes. His father was a prosperous farmer and a leading local member of the Croatian Peasant Party, who during World War II became a deputy on the State Anti-fascist Council for the National Liberation of Bosnia and Herzegovina or (abv. ZAVNOBiH). Mikulić finished gymnasium in Bugojno and together with his father Jure joined the Yugoslav Partisans in 1943. After the war, he attended the University of Zagreb's Faculty of Economy.

== Early political career ==
As a young and ambitious party leader, after studying in Zagreb, Mikulić returned to his birthplace to become a full-time politician. He became a deputy for Bugojno and for the West Bosnian district, and in 1965 secretary of the Central Committee of the League of Communists of Bosnia and Herzegovina – before being elected its president in 1969.

=== Bosniak emancipation and republic's nationhood ===
He insisted on distinctiveness of Bosnia and Herzegovina which was characterized by historical permeation of cultures and customs that "shaped the man of this land" and enforced a unique and distinctive "Bosnian soul", but he never missed to emphasize the value of "unity of particularity" and "particularity in unity", as well as the fact that Bosnia and Herzegovina is the "motherland of all those who live there". He never shied away to criticize attempts of outside political centers, especially those in Croatia and Serbia, to interfere with Bosnia and Herzegovina internal affairs.

Mikulić and his team proceeded to build a system of social and national equality on the ZAVNOBiH model, by way of full emancipation of the Bosniak nation and reintegration of the Bosnian Croats into the political system. Meanwhile, western Herzegovina enjoyed economic regeneration during Mikulić's rule.

In 1970, prior to the 1971 population census in Yugoslavia, Mikulić confronted a group of older generation of Bosnian officials, including two powerful Muslim politicians, who complained to Tito that the (m)uslim national status does not need any further resolution nor de iure verification, because, as they contended, (m)uslims are merely an Islamised Serbs, Montenegrins, Croats, and Yugoslavs, after which Tito requested Mikulić's immediate presence and explanation. Mikulić was ready, and after his expose at the meeting Tito fully agreed that without Bosniak emancipation there can be no Bosnia and Herzegovina either.

While working within the communist system, Mikulić joined forces with a group, who belonged to a second generation of post-WWII politicians, and which included Džemal Bijedić, Milanko Renovica and Hamdija Pozderac. They strived to reinforce and protect the sovereignty of Bosnia and Herzegovina and achieve full national equality on the basis of both ZAVNOBiH and Second AVNOJ conclusions, and with a system reform in 1971, which eventually resulted in new constitution of 1974, they were successful.

Mikulić saw industrial and economic development of the Republic as priority, but pushed for its cultural development with the same determination.

They were considered to be a backbone of the political system of Bosnia and Herzegovina during much of the 1970s and '80s. Their efforts proved key during the turbulent period following Tito's death in 1980 and are today considered some of the early steps towards Bosnian independence.

== Premiership (1986–1989) ==
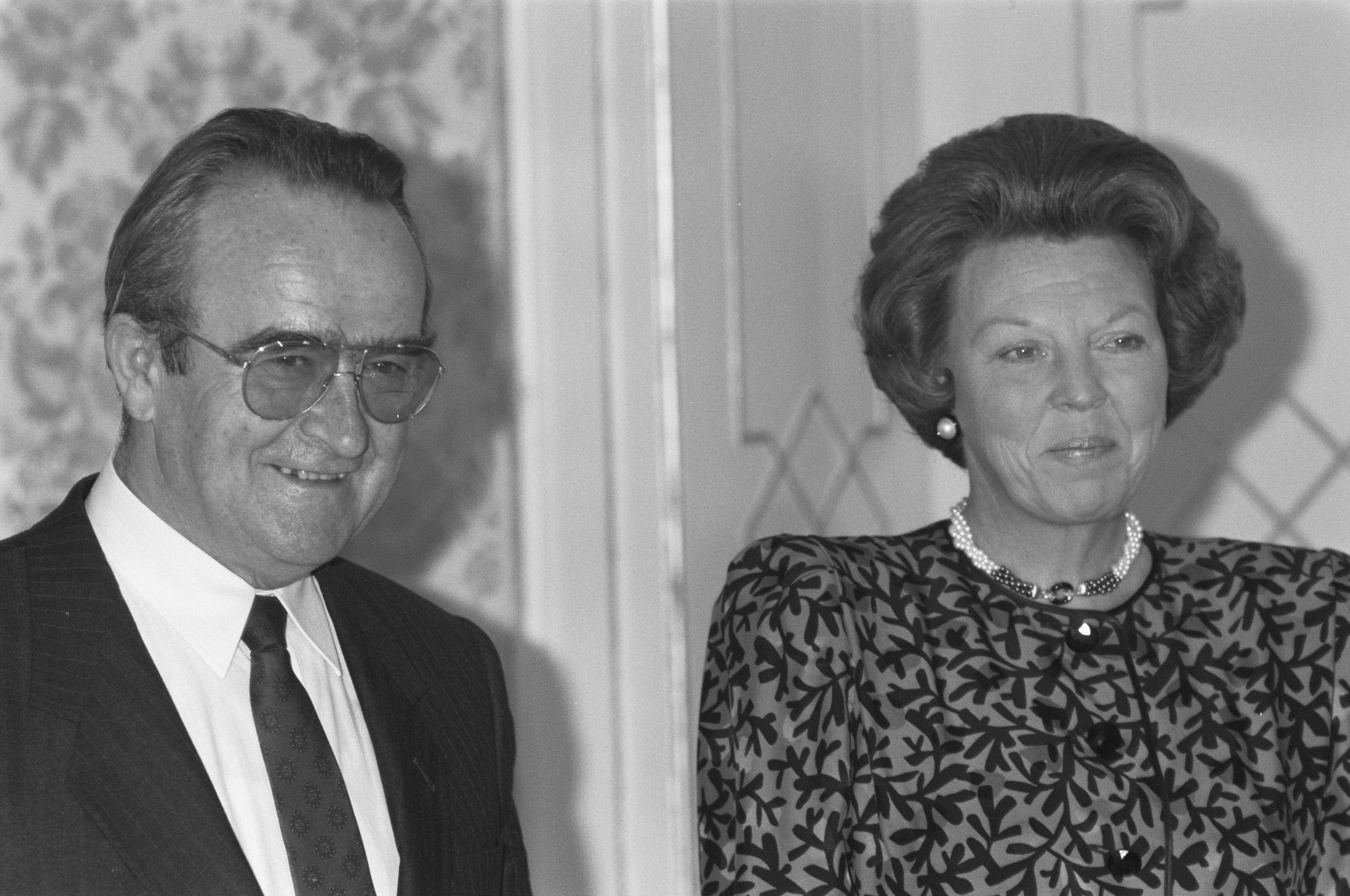
Mikulić alongside Beatrix of the Netherlands, 6 December 1988

Mikulić was nominated as Prime Minister by the Yugoslav Presidency as successor to Milka Planinc in January 1986. In Ljubljana, Slovenian sociologist Tomaž Mastnak criticized Mikulić's nomination over the radio. The government subsequently laid charges against Mastnak. On 15 May 1986, he was appointed President of the Federal Executive Council, officially making him the Yugoslav Prime Minister.

In March 1987, Mikulić was publicly rebuked for his economic policy by striking workers who refused to serve him while in Kranjska Gora for a ski-jump competition. After the outbreak of 70 strikes nationally in a two-week period (with strikes being illegal in Yugoslavia), Mikulić threatened to mobilize the army to restore order in May 1987. His government devalued the dinar by 25% on 17 November 1987. Mikulić reached a Standby Agreement with the International Monetary Fund in 1988. SR Croatia and SR Slovenia attempted to launch a no-confidence motion against Mikulić in May 1988, but this proved unsuccessful.

In June 1988, several thousand people protested in front of the Federal Assembly calling for Mikulić's resignation. After a no-confidence vote in the Federal Assembly, Mikulić resigned his post on 30 December 1988 and returned to Sarajevo. With this, his government became the first and only government brought down by parliament in the history of Yugoslavia. Mikulić left office with Yugoslavia in 21 billion USD of debt to Western countries. He was replaced by Ante Marković on 16 March 1989.

== Siege of Sarajevo and death ==
Mikulić resolutely refused to leave besieged Sarajevo, although his health was quite compromised at the time. In the 1990s, in an interview for Nedeljna Dalmacija he stated, that in the event of the breakup of Yugoslavia, he would remain with those "who choose a sovereign and independent Bosnia and Herzegovina and its territorial integrity within the existing borders."

Mikulić received the last rites shortly before his death. He died quietly on 12 April 1994 during the siege of Sarajevo. Mikulić was buried in the Catholic cemetery Sv. Josip in Sarajevo.

== Legacy ==
Mikulić was one of the leading politicians in Bosnia and Herzegovina during the communist rule in the former Yugoslavia. He contributed to underdeveloped Bosnia and Herzegovina post-WWII industrial and economic development like no other politician and was main force behind its rise as equal among the Republics at the Federal table. He maintained that Bosnia and Herzegovina cultural development is as important as economic progress and worked to accomplish that goal. He was unwavering in his conviction that the Bosniaks of Bosnia and Herzegovina, at the time (m)uslims, must get equal status as a people both in Bosnia and in Yugoslavia, and that, therefore, their national distinctiveness and nationhood in relation to other nations must be recognized in full. He was fierce critic of nationalism and any outside interference with Bosnia internal matters.

However, memory and recognition in Bosnia and Herzegovina and Sarajevo rarely goes beyond annual commemoration of his death in media.

=== Sarajevo Winter Olympics ===
Before moving from the political scene in 1989, Mikulić was a leading official in the organizing committee of the Sarajevo 1984 Winter Olympic Games, and the person most responsible in getting the Games to the city, despite resistance from other Yugoslav political centers and media.

== Bibliography ==
- Sarač-Rujanac, Dženita (2022). "Branko Mikulić: political biography 1965-1989". Historijska Traganja (21): 287–291. ISSN 1840-3875.
- Sarač-Rujanac, Dženita (2020). Branko Mikulić: politička biografija 1965-1989 (in Bosnian). Institut za historiju Univerziteta. ISBN 978-9958-649-35-6.
- Lasić, Mile (13 May 2015). "O Mikuliću: BiH može ozdraviti". Autograf.hr.

Political offices
Preceded by Milka Planinc	Prime Minister of Yugoslavia; 1986–1989	Succeeded by Ante Marković
Sporting positions
Preceded by (United States) Rev. J. Bernard Fell	President of the Organising Committee for the Winter Olympic Games; 1984	Succeeded by (Canada) Frank King
