= 1969 Yugoslavian parliamentary election =

← 1967	13 April–9 May 1969	1974 →

All 120 seats in the Socio-Political Council All 360 seats in the Councils of Working Communities All seats in the Council of Nationalities
- Turnout: 87.96%
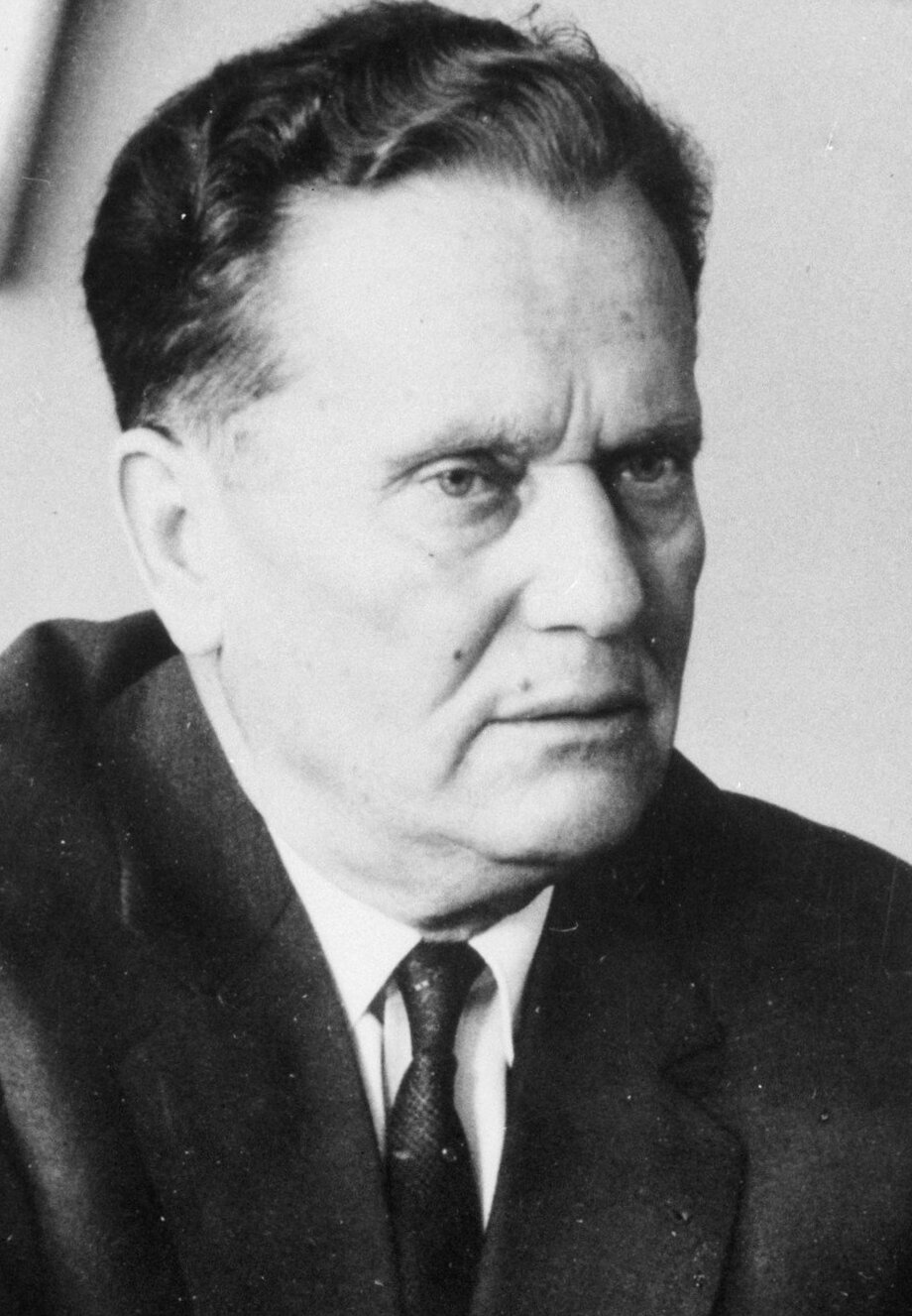
	First party
Leader	Josip Broz Tito
Party	SKJ
Alliance	SSRNJ
Seats won	120
Prime Minister before election
Mika Špiljak
SKJ
Prime Minister after election
Mitja Ribičič
SKJ

Parliamentary elections were held in Yugoslavia in 1969. The Socio-Political Council was elected on 13 April, the three Councils of Working Communities were elected on 23 April, and the Council of Nationalities was elected on 6, 7, 8 and 9 May.

== Background ==
The elections were held following amendments to the 1963 constitution made in December 1968.

== Electoral system ==
The Federal Assembly consisted of five chambers:

- the Socio-Political Council, whose 120 members were directly elected in single member constituencies. Candidates required a plurality of the votes when opposed. When unopposed, they required the votes of at least 50% of the registered voters. If this was not achieved, a second round was held.
- the Council of Nationalities, which had 140 members elected by the Provincial Assemblies. The Assemblies of Bosnia and Herzegovina, Croatia, Macedonia, Montenegro, Serbia and Slovenia each elected twenty members, whilst the Assemblies of Kosovo and Vojvodina elected ten each.
- the three Councils of Working Communities, each of which had 120 members elected by delegates from their industries.
  - the Economic Council, whose members were elected by those directly or indirectly employed in "craftsmanship, agriculture, banking, commerce, hotel trade, industry, press and publishing, communal services, transport and scientific research associated with these fields.
  - the Educational and Cultural Council, whose members were elected by those directly or indirectly employed in the arts, education, science or sport.
  - the Council for Social Affairs and Health, whose members were elected by those directly or indirectly employed in social insurance, medical research, medical science or social services.

== Results ==
=== Socio-Political Council ===
Party	Votes	%	Seats
176 candidates	11,173,725	100.00	120
Total	11,173,725	100.00	120
Valid votes	11,173,725	99.31	
Invalid/blank votes	77,397	0.69	
Total votes	11,251,122	100.00	
Registered voters/turnout	12,790,517	87.96	
Source: IPU

=== Councils of Working Communities ===
Council	Seats	Candidates	Elected in first round
Economic Council	120	184	117
Educational and Cultural Council	120	225	116
Council for Social Affairs and Health	120	206	117
Source: IPU
