= President of the Federal Executive Council of Yugoslavia =

Head of Government of Yugoslavia

The president of the Federal Executive Council was the head of government of the Socialist Federal Republic of Yugoslavia, from the adoption of the 1963 constitution until the complete breakup of the country in 1992. Most non-Yugoslav sources referred to the post as "Prime Minister."

== History ==
The 1953 Yugoslav constitutional law proclaimed the country to be a socialist state and abolished the institutions of prime minister and Government that had existed since the country's establishment in 1918. A new office of president of the Republic was created for Yugoslav communist leader Josip Broz Tito which would be both the country's head of state and would simultaneously preside over the new Federal Executive Council (FEC). The then FEC was fundamentally different from governments to date. It was made up of 30 to 45 members elected from the Federal Assembly with only five of these members becoming state secretaries for one of five secretariats (rather than ministries) and two or more members becoming Vice President of the Federal Executive Council. Government ministries to date were dissolved and their work continued by various Federal Administrations headed by appointed directors.

The 1963 Yugoslav constitution separated some of the executive roles of the president of the Republic and moved them to the new office of president of the FEC who would preside over that body. The president of the FEC would be elected by the Federal Assembly upon their nomination by the president of the Republic. When the individual president was replaced by a collective presidency, the new head of state took charge of the nomination.

== List ==
League of Communists of Yugoslavia Union of Reform Forces Socialist Party of Serbia

No.	Head of Government	Lifespan	Republic	Term of office		Party	Note
1	Petar Stambolić	1912–2007	SR Serbia	29 June 1963	16 May 1967	League of Communists of Yugoslavia	
2	Mika Špiljak	1916–2007	SR Croatia	16 May 1967	18 May 1969	League of Communists of Yugoslavia	
3	Mitja Ribičič	1919–2013	SR Slovenia	18 May 1969	30 July 1971	League of Communists of Yugoslavia	
4	Džemal Bijedić	1917–1977	SR Bosnia and Herzegovina	30 July 1971	18 January 1977	League of Communists of Yugoslavia	Died in office.
5	Veselin Đuranović (two terms)	1925–1997	SR Montenegro	18 January 1977	16 May 1982	League of Communists of Yugoslavia	
6	Milka Planinc	1924–2010	SR Croatia	16 May 1982	15 May 1986	League of Communists of Yugoslavia	
7	Branko Mikulić	1928–1994	SR Bosnia and Herzegovina	15 May 1986	16 March 1989	League of Communists of Yugoslavia	Resigned on 30 December 1988, amid widespread protests.
8	Ante Marković	1924–2011	SR Croatia	16 March 1989	20 December 1991	League of Communists of Yugoslavia (until January 1990)	Last prime minister of Yugoslavia. The pan-Yugoslav League of Communists of Yugoslavia was dissolved in January 1990, Marković formed his own party, the Union of Reform Forces.
	Ante Marković	1924–2011	SR Croatia	16 March 1989	20 December 1991	Union of Reform Forces (from January 1990)	Last prime minister of Yugoslavia. The pan-Yugoslav League of Communists of Yugoslavia was dissolved in January 1990, Marković formed his own party, the Union of Reform Forces.
N/A	Aleksandar Mitrović (acting)	1933–2012	SR Serbia	20 December 1991	14 July 1992	Socialist Party of Serbia	Acting President of the FEC as the then Vice President.

== See also ==
- Chairman of the Council of Ministers of Bosnia and Herzegovina
- Prime Minister of Croatia
- Prime Minister of Serbia and Montenegro
- Prime Minister of Kosovo
- Prime Minister of Montenegro
- Prime Minister of North Macedonia
- Prime Minister of Serbia
- Prime Minister of Slovenia
