= 1974 Yugoslavian parliamentary election =

- 16 March–10 May 1974

All 220 seats in the Federal Chamber All 88 seats in the Chamber of Republics and Provinces
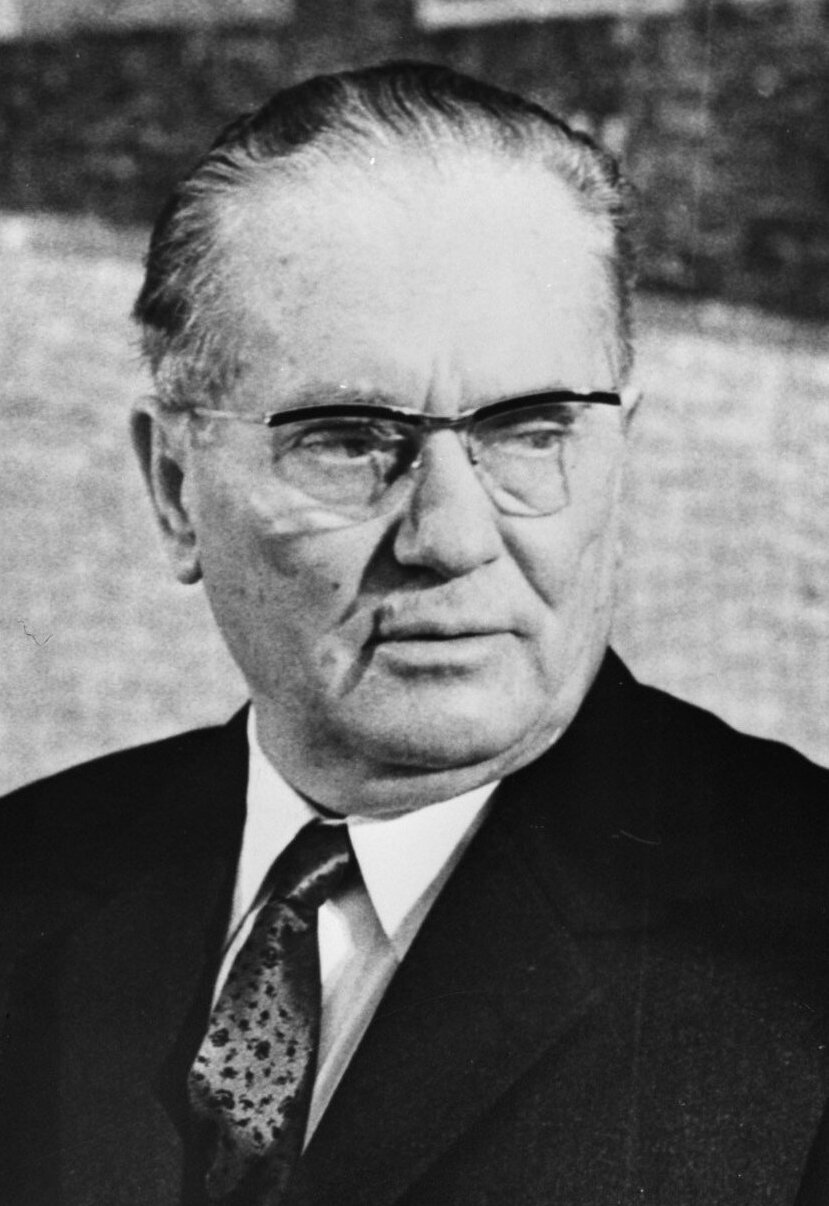
	First party
Leader	Josip Broz Tito
Party	SKJ
Alliance	SSRNJ
Seats won	220
Prime Minister before election
Džemal Bijedić
SKJ
Prime Minister after election
Džemal Bijedić
SKJ

Parliamentary elections were held in Yugoslavia between 16 March and 10 May 1974 through a complicated delegate system which selected delegates to local, republic, and federal assemblies.

== Background ==
The elections were the first held under the new constitution adopted on 31 January 1974. It provided for a bicameral Assembly with a 220-member Federal Chamber and an 88-member Chamber of Republics and Provinces.

== Electoral system ==
The members of the Federal Chamber represented three groups; self-managing organisations, communities and socio-political organisations. Thirty members were elected from each of the six republics and 20 from the two autonomous provinces, Kosovo and Vojvodina.

In late March, voters elected representatives of basic labour organisations. These in turn elected the Communal Assemblies in early April. The Communal Assemblies then elected the members of the Federal Chamber between 22 and 29 April.

The members of the Chamber of Republics were elected by the Assemblies of the six republics and provinces, with each republic electing 12 members and Kosovo and Vojvodina electing eight each. Members were elected in a period ending on 10 May.

=== Communal assemblies, April ===
Communal assemblies were elected by local delegates elected by self-managing organisations, communities and socio-political organisations in early April. They subsequently each elected a President of the Assembly equivalent to a mayor. There were a total of 501 such tricameral communal assemblies in the country. For some of the larger cities:

City	President of the Assembly	Party
Belgrade	Živorad Kovačević	SKJ
Ljubljana	Tone Kovič	SKJ
Niš	Vladimir Petrović	SKJ
Novi Sad	Jovan Dejanović	SKJ
Podgorica	Miro Popović	SKJ
Rijeka	Nikola Pavletić	SKJ
Sarajevo	Dane Maljković	SKJ
Skopje	Metodi Antonov	SKJ
Split	Vjekoslav Vidjak	SKJ
Subotica	József Dékány	SKJ
Zagreb	Ivo Vrhovec	SKJ

=== Republic and provincial assemblies convened, April ===
In April and May inaugural sessions of all three chambers of the republics' and provinces' assemblies convened for the first time and elected the presidents of all their bodies.

Republic	President of the Assembly	Party
SR Bosnia and Herzegovina	Hamdija Pozderac	SKJ
SR Croatia	Ivo Perišin	SKJ
SR Macedonia	Blagoja Taleski	SKJ
SR Montenegro	Budislav Šoškić	SKJ
SR Serbia	Živan Vasiljević	SKJ
SR Slovenia	Marijan Brecelj	SKJ
SAP Vojvodina	Sreten Kovačević	SKJ

=== Republic Presidencies and Executive Councils, April ===
Republic	President of the Presidency	Took office	Party	President of Executive Council	Took office	Party
SR Bosnia and Herzegovina	Ratomir Dugonjić	May 1974	SKJ	Milanko Renovica	April 1974	SKJ
SR Croatia	Jakov Blažević	8 May 1974	SKJ	Jakov Sirotković	8 May 1974	SKJ
SR Macedonia	Vidoe Smilevski	6 May 1974	SKJ	Blagoj Popov	April 1974	SKJ
SR Montenegro	Veljko Milatović	5 April 1974	SKJ	Marko Orlandić	6 May 1974	SKJ
SR Serbia	Dragoslav Marković	6 May 1974	SKJ	Dušan Čkrebić	6 May 1974	SKJ
SR Slovenia	Sergej Kraigher	May 1974	SKJ	Andrej Marinc	May 1974	SKJ

=== Council of Republics and Provinces elected by 10 May ===
By 10 May the assemblies of the republics and provinces elected members from each of their three constituent councils (Associated Labour, Socio-Political, and Municipal) to serve dual mandates within their republic or province and within the Federal Council of Republics and Provinces. Each republic sent 12 members to the council, while the two provinces sent 8 each.

Republic or province	Council of Associated Labour members	Council of Municipalities members	Socio-Political Council members	Total
SR Bosnia and Herzegovina	0	3	8	11
SR Croatia	1	2	9	12
SAP Kosovo	3	2	3	8
SR Macedonia	0	3	9	12
SR Montenegro	0	4	8	12
SR Serbia	3	1	8	12
SR Slovenia	3	2	7	12
SAP Vojvodina	0	1	7	8
Total	10	18	59	87

=== Assembly convened, 15 May ===
On 15 May a joint session of both chambers of the Assembly convened for the first time and elected the presidents of all the bodies.

Role	Official	Took office	Party	Representing
President of the Assembly	Kiro Gligorov	15 May 1974	SKJ	SR Macedonia
Vice President of the Assembly	Marijan Cvetković	15 May 1974	SKJ	SR Croatia
Vice President of the Assembly	Peko Dapčević	15 May 1974	SKJ	SR Montenegro
Vice President of the Assembly	Sinan Hasani	15 May 1974	SKJ	SAP Kosovo
Vice President of the Assembly	Rudi Kolak	15 May 1974	SKJ	SR Bosnia and Herzegovina
Vice President of the Assembly	Branko Pešić	15 May 1974	SKJ	SR Serbia
President of the Federal Council	Danilo Kekić	15 May 1974	SKJ	SAP Vojvodina
President of the Council of Republics and Provinces	Zoran Polič	15 May 1974	SKJ	SR Slovenia

=== President and Presidency, 16 May ===
On 16 May a joint assembly of both chambers of the Assembly re-elected President of the League of Communists Josip Broz Tito as President of the Republic. Article 333 of the new constitution affirmed Tito's right to serve as president-for-life at the discretion of the Assembly.

Role	Official	Took office	Party
President of the Republic	Josip Broz Tito	16 May 1974 (14 January 1953)	SKJ

The Assembly also announced the election of the members of the collective Presidency by individual republic and provincial assemblies on 16 May.

Role in Presidency	Official	Took office	Party	Representing
Vice President	Petar Stambolić	16 May 1974	SKJ	SR Serbia
Member	Lazar Koliševski	16 May 1974	SKJ	SR Macedonia
Member	Vidoje Žarković	16 May 1974	SKJ	SR Montenegro
Member	Stevan Doronjski	16 May 1974	SKJ	SAP Vojvodina
Member	Fadil Hoxha	16 May 1974	SKJ	SAP Kosovo
Member	Cvijetin Mijatović	16 May 1974	SKJ	SR Bosnia and Herzegovina
Member	Edvard Kardelj	16 May 1974	SKJ	SR Slovenia
Member	Vladimir Bakarić	16 May 1974	SKJ	SR Croatia

=== Federal Executive Council elected, 17 May ===
On 17 May a new Federal Executive Council was elected with Džemal Bijedić serving as its president.
