= Mitja Ribičič =

Slovenian and Yugoslav politician

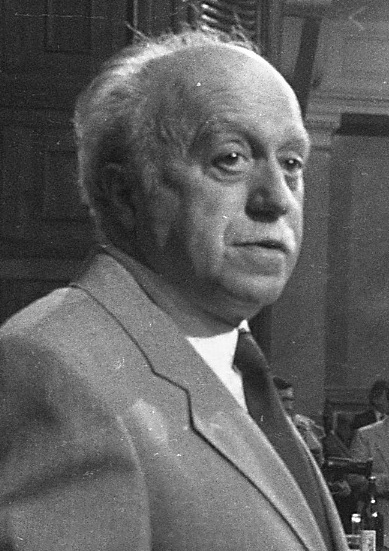
- Ribičič in 1983

President of the Presidency of the Central Committee of the League of Communists of Yugoslavia
- In office 29 June 1982 – 30 June 1983
- President: Petar Stambolić; Mika Špiljak
- Prime Minister: Milka Planinc
- Preceded by: Dušan Dragosavac
- Succeeded by: Dragoslav Marković

22nd Prime Minister of Yugoslavia President of the Federal Executive Council
- In office 18 May 1969 – 30 July 1971
- President: Josip Broz Tito
- Preceded by: Mika Špiljak
- Succeeded by: Džemal Bijedić

3rd Vice President of the Presidency of the Socialist Federal Republic of Yugoslavia
- In office June 1973 – 16 May 1974
- President: Josip Broz Tito
- Prime Minister: Džemal Bijedić
- Preceded by: Ratomir Dugonjić
- Succeeded by: Petar Stambolić

Personal details
- Born: May 19, 1919 Trieste, Kingdom of Italy
- Died: 28 November 2013 (aged 94) Ljubljana, Slovenia
- Party: League of Communists of Yugoslavia (1941–1990)

Mitja Ribičič (19 May 1919 – 28 November 2013) was a Slovenian and Yugoslav communist politician. He was the Prime Minister of Yugoslavia—the only Slovenian to hold the office—from 1969 to 1971.

== Life and career ==
He was born in a Slovene-speaking family in Trieste, Italy. His father was the Slovene author Josip Ribičič (born in town Baška, Isle of Krk, Croatia). His mother, Roza Ribičič, née Arrigler or Arigler, was a teacher in Slovene schools in Trieste, and an editor and public figure. She was the niece of the poet Anton Medved.

In 1925 the family moved to Rakek, Slovenia, then part of the Kingdom of Serbs, Croats and Slovenes (Yugoslavia), where Ribičič attended elementary school. In 1929 they settled in Ljubljana. In 1938 Ribičič enrolled in the University of Ljubljana, where he studied law. In his student years, he became a member of several left wing youth organizations, and associations of Slovene emigrants from the Julian March. In April 1941, when Yugoslavia was invaded by the Nazis, he volunteered for the Royal Yugoslav Army. After the Yugoslav defeat in late April, he joined the Liberation Front of the Slovenian People. In October 1941 he became a member of the Yugoslav Communist Party's (KPJ) Slovenian branch.

In May 1942 he joined the Partisan resistance. He fought in various units parts of Slovenia that had been annexed by Germany, first in Lower Styria, then in Upper Carniola, and in southern Carinthia. In November 1944 he was sent to the Soviet Union for training.

After his return in early 1945, he served as a high-ranking official of the OZNA, the Yugoslav military intelligence, and then in the UDBA, the secret police. He was in charge of political repression of the anti-communist opposition in Slovenia. Between 1951 and 1952 he served as chief prosecutor for the People's Republic of Slovenia, and then until 1957 as the Secretary of the Interior of the People's Republic of Slovenia.

Between 1957 and 1963 he was a member of the Slovenian government, and then a member of the Central Committee of the Communist Party of Slovenia. In 1966 he rose to the leadership of the Yugoslav Communist Party, serving first as a member of the Executive Central Committee of the Party, and then as president of the Yugoslav Federal Executive Council.

Between 1974 and 1982 he was president of the Socialist Union of the Working People of Slovenia, the official platform that included all professional and voluntary associations in Slovenia. Between 1982 and 1983, he became president of the Central Committee of the Communist Party of Yugoslavia, and was one of its members until 1986, when he retired. He died on 28 November 2013 at the age of 94 in Ljubljana and is buried in the family grave in Žale cemetery in Ljubljana. His son, Ciril is a left wing politician (member of the Social Democrats) and lawyer, as of 2013 a member of the Slovenian Constitutional Court.

== Accusations of human rights violations ==
Several victims of Communist political persecution accused him of brutal treatment during the time when he was an official with the secret police, including Angela Vode and Ljubo Sirc. In 1970, when Ribičič visited Great Britain as the head of the Yugoslav Government, Sirc, a British citizen, launched a public protest, disclosing the mistreatment suffered at the hands of Ribičič in 1946.

In May 2005, the Slovenian Police filed an indictment against Ribičič for genocide. The evidence, involving the actions of the Yugoslav Army against prisoners of war and civilians in the aftermath of World War II, was investigated by the Slovenian Supreme State Prosecutor's Office first for genocide and later for war crime against civilians. Pursuant to this, a proposal to open a case was brought forward to the District Court in Ljubljana in April 2006, but the court rejected it due to the principle of non-retroactivity in criminal law and lack of evidence. This decision was then appealed by the Prosecutor's Office to the High Court, which also dismissed it as lacking direct evidence, without providing the precise reasoning, but found the basic principles of humanity to be above the prohibition of retroactivity in such a setting. The historian Jože Dežman, head of the Slovenian commission investigating concealed mass graves, criticised the rejection as "extremely indecent".

Another indictment, based on the presumed newly discovered evidence, was lodged against Ribičič at the Slovenian Prosecutor's Office due to suspected genocide and war crime by the freelance journalist and investigator of post-war killings Roman Leljak in October 2013, but the Prosecutor's Office dismissed it in December 2013 due to Ribičič's death.

== Sources ==
- Primorski slovenski bibliografski leksikon: 'Mitja Ribičič'

Political offices
Preceded by Mika Špiljak	Prime Minister of Yugoslavia; 1969–1971	Succeeded by Džemal Bijedić
