= Nazmi Mustafa =

Albanian politician (1924–1997)

Nazmi Mustafa (6 January 1924 – 21 August 1997) was an Albanian politician from Kosovo, he is best known for his time as the mayor of Pristina, Kosovo from 1972–1978.

== Other political and social activities ==
- Member of Provincial Parliament of the Autonomous Socialist Province of Kosovo.
- Member of Provincial Committee.
- Vice-President of the Society of Technicians and Engineers of Yugoslavia.
- Kosovo's Representative in the Central Parliament.
