= 1963 Yugoslavian parliamentary election =

- 16 June 1963

All 120 seats in the Federal Council
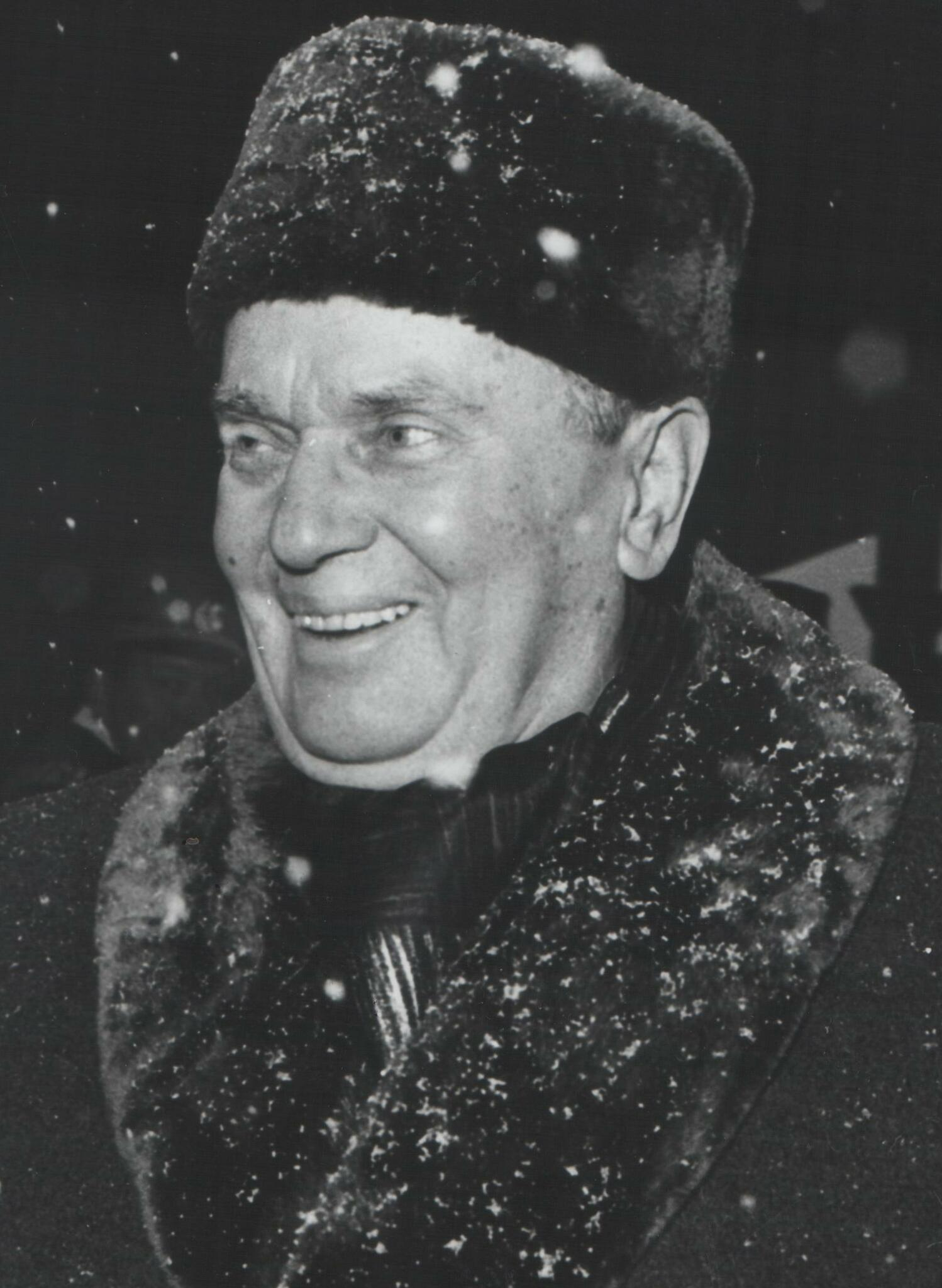
	First party
Leader	Josip Broz Tito
Party	SKJ
Alliance	SSRNJ
Seats won	120
Prime Minister before election
Josip Broz Tito
SKJ
Prime Minister after election
Petar Stambolić
SKJ

Parliamentary elections were held in Yugoslavia in June 1963. They were the first held under the 1963 constitution which created a five-chamber Federal Assembly. Only one chamber, the 120-seat Federal Council, was chosen by universal suffrage, with its election taking place on 16 June. The other four chambers, the Economic Council, the Educational-Cultural Council, the Social and Heath Council and the Organizational-Political Council were elected between 3 and 16 June by people employed or specializing in a related industry.

== Results ==
=== Federal Council ===
Party	Votes	%	Seats
Socialist Alliance of Working People	11,088,470	100.00	120
Total	11,088,470	100.00	120
Valid votes	11,088,470	97.77	
Invalid/blank votes	252,565	2.23	
Total votes	11,341,035	100.00	
Registered voters/turnout	11,829,217	95.87	
Source: Sternberger et al.
