= 1990 Montenegrin municipal elections =

Montenegrin municipal elections were held in 1990.

== Results ==
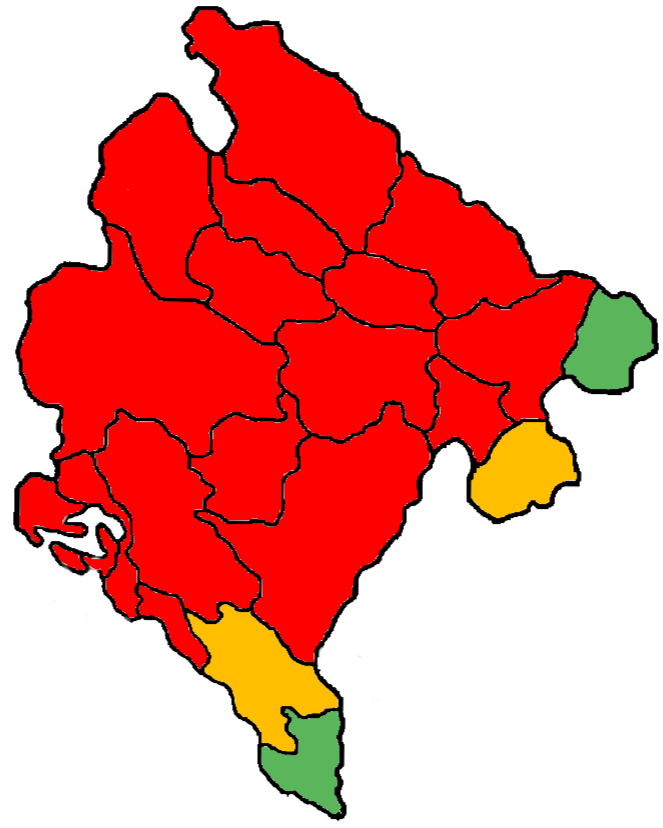
Results of the election for Municipal councils: red - League of Communists orange - Union of Reform Forces green - Democratic Alliance (SDA-DS)

Municipality	Party					Total seats
Municipality	League of Communists	People's Party	Union of Reform Forces	SDA-DS	DSSP	Total seats
Bar	21	1	29	4	0	55
Bijelo Polje	30	10	2	23	0	65
Budva	28	7	5	0	0	40
Cetinje	36	0	11	0	0	47
Danilovgrad	42	2	1	0	0	45
Herceg Novi	40	15	8	0	2	65
Ivangrad	36	10	3	6	0	55
Kolašin	40	8	1	0	0	49
Kotor	40	9	16	0	0	65
Mojkovac	55	8	0	0	0	63
Nikšić	65	4	0	0	0	69
Plav	13	0	26	6	0	45
Plužine	25	6	0	0	0	31
Pljevlja	32	17	0	6	0	55
Rožaje	8	0	12	44	0	64
Šavnik	33	2	0	0	0	35
Titograd	68	8	11	4	0	91
Tivat	23	5	17	0	0	45
Ulcinj	8	0	7	30	0	45
Žabljak	37	0	0	0	0	37
