= 1978 Yugoslavian parliamentary election =

- 10 March–10 May 1978

All 220 seats in the Federal Chamber All 88 seats in the Chamber of Republics and Provinces
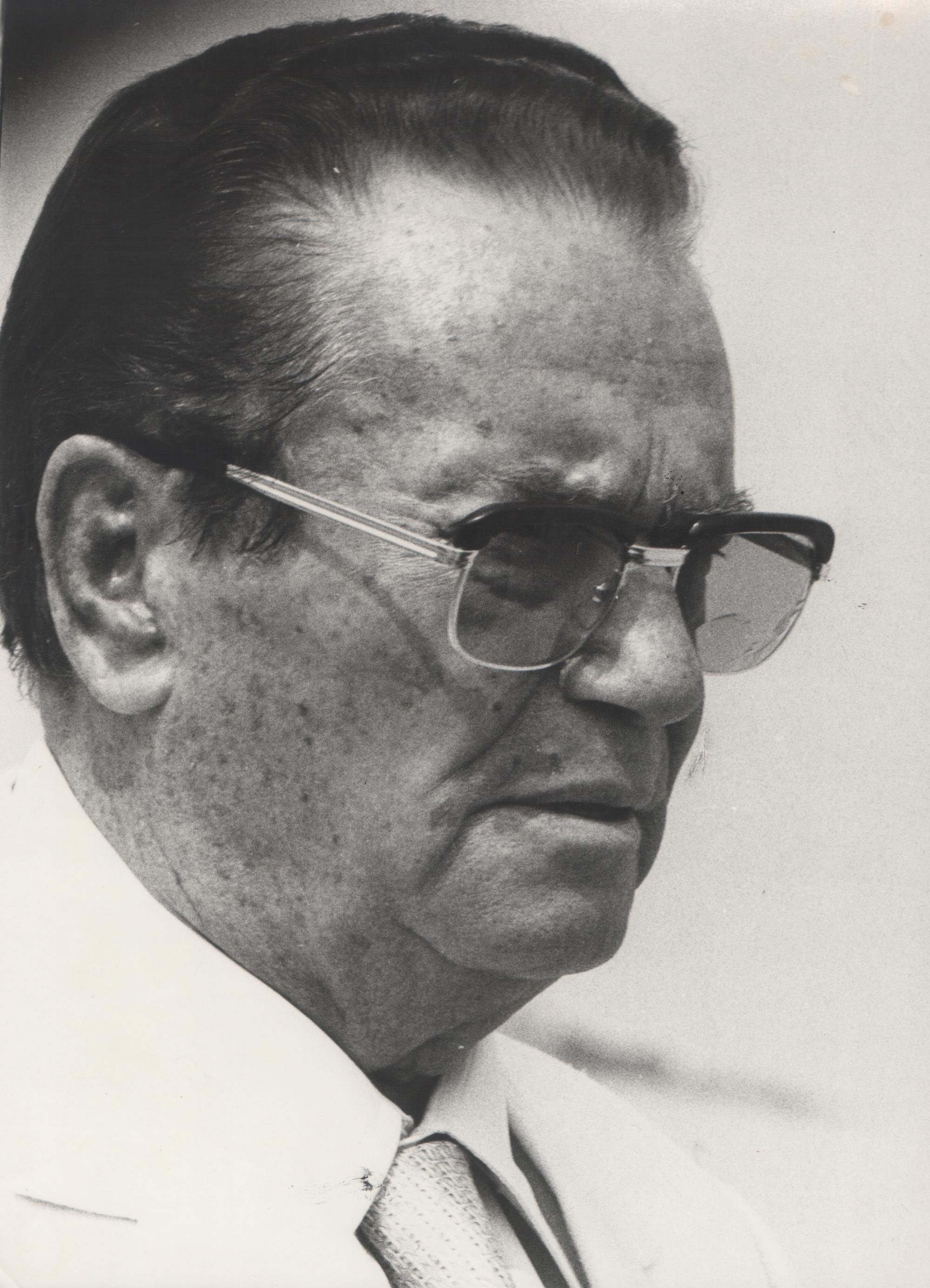
	First party
Leader	Josip Broz Tito
Party	SKJ
Alliance	SSRNJ
Seats won	220
Prime Minister before election
Veselin Đuranović
SKJ
Prime Minister after election
Veselin Đuranović
SKJ

Parliamentary elections were held in Yugoslavia between 10 March and 10 May 1978 through a complicated delegate system which selected delegates to local, republic, and federal assemblies. They were the final federal elections held before the death of Josip Broz Tito.

== Background ==
The elections were the second held under the new constitution adopted on 31 January 1974. It provided for a bicameral Assembly with a 220-member Federal Chamber and an 88-member Chamber of Republics and Provinces.

== Electoral system ==
The members of the Federal Chamber represented three groups; self-managing organisations, communities and socio-political organisations. Thirty members were elected from each of the six republics and 20 from the two autonomous provinces, Kosovo and Vojvodina.

In March, voters elected representatives of basic labour organisations. These in turn elected the Communal Assemblies in early April. The Communal Assemblies then elected the members of the Federal Chamber.

The members of the Chamber of Republics were elected by the Assemblies of the six republics and provinces, with each republic electing 12 members and Kosovo and Vojvodina electing eight each. Members were elected in a period ending on 10 May.

=== Republic and provincial assemblies convened, April ===
In April and May inaugural sessions of all three chambers of the republics' and provinces' assemblies convened for the first time and elected the presidents of all their bodies.

Republic	President of the Assembly	Party
SR Bosnia and Herzegovina	Niko Mihaljević	SKJ
SR Croatia	Jure Bilić	SKJ
SR Macedonia	Blagoja Taleski	SKJ
SR Montenegro	Budislav Šoškić	SKJ
SR Serbia	Dušan Čkrebić	SKJ
SR Slovenia	Milan Kučan	SKJ
SAP Vojvodina	Vilmoš Molnar	SKJ

=== Republic Presidencies and Executive Councils, April ===
Republic	President of the Presidency	Took office	Party	President of Executive Council	Took office	Party
SR Bosnia and Herzegovina	Raif Dizdarević	April 1978	SKJ	Milanko Renovica	April 1978	SKJ
SR Croatia	Jakov Blažević	May 1978	SKJ	Petar Fleković	9 May 1978	SKJ
SR Macedonia	Vidoe Smilevski	May 1978	SKJ	Blagoj Popov	April 1978	SKJ
SR Montenegro	Veljko Milatović	April 1978	SKJ	Momčilo Cemović	28 April 1978	SKJ
SR Serbia	Dobrivoje Vidić	5 May 1978	SKJ	Ivan Stambolić	6 May 1978	SKJ
SR Slovenia	Sergej Kraigher	May 1978	SKJ	Anton Vratuša	April 1978	SKJ

=== Assembly convened, 15 May ===
On 15 May a joint session of both chambers of the Assembly convened for the first time and elected the presidents of all the bodies.

Role	Official	Took office	Party	Representing
President of the Assembly	Dragoslav Marković	15 May 1978	SKJ	SR Serbia
Vice President of the Assembly	Kiro Hadži-Vasilev	15 May 1978	SKJ	SR Macedonia
Vice President of the Assembly	Sinan Hasani	15 May 1978	SKJ	SAP Kosovo
Vice President of the Assembly	Rudi Kolak	15 May 1978	SKJ	SR Bosnia and Herzegovina
Vice President of the Assembly	Sreten Kovačević	15 May 1978	SKJ	SAP Vojvodina
Vice President of the Assembly	Ivan Kukoč	15 May 1978	SKJ	SR Croatia
President of the Federal Council	Dobroslav Ćulafić	15 May 1974	SKJ	SR Montenegro
President of the Council of Republics and Provinces	Zoran Polič	15 May 1978	SKJ	SR Slovenia

=== Federal Executive Council elected, 17 May ===
On 16 May a new Federal Executive Council was elected with Veselin Đuranović serving as its president.
