= President of Yugoslavia =

Head of state of SFR Yugoslavia (1953-80); only occupied by Josip Broz Tito

President of the Socialist Federal Republic of Yugoslavia
- Standard of the President

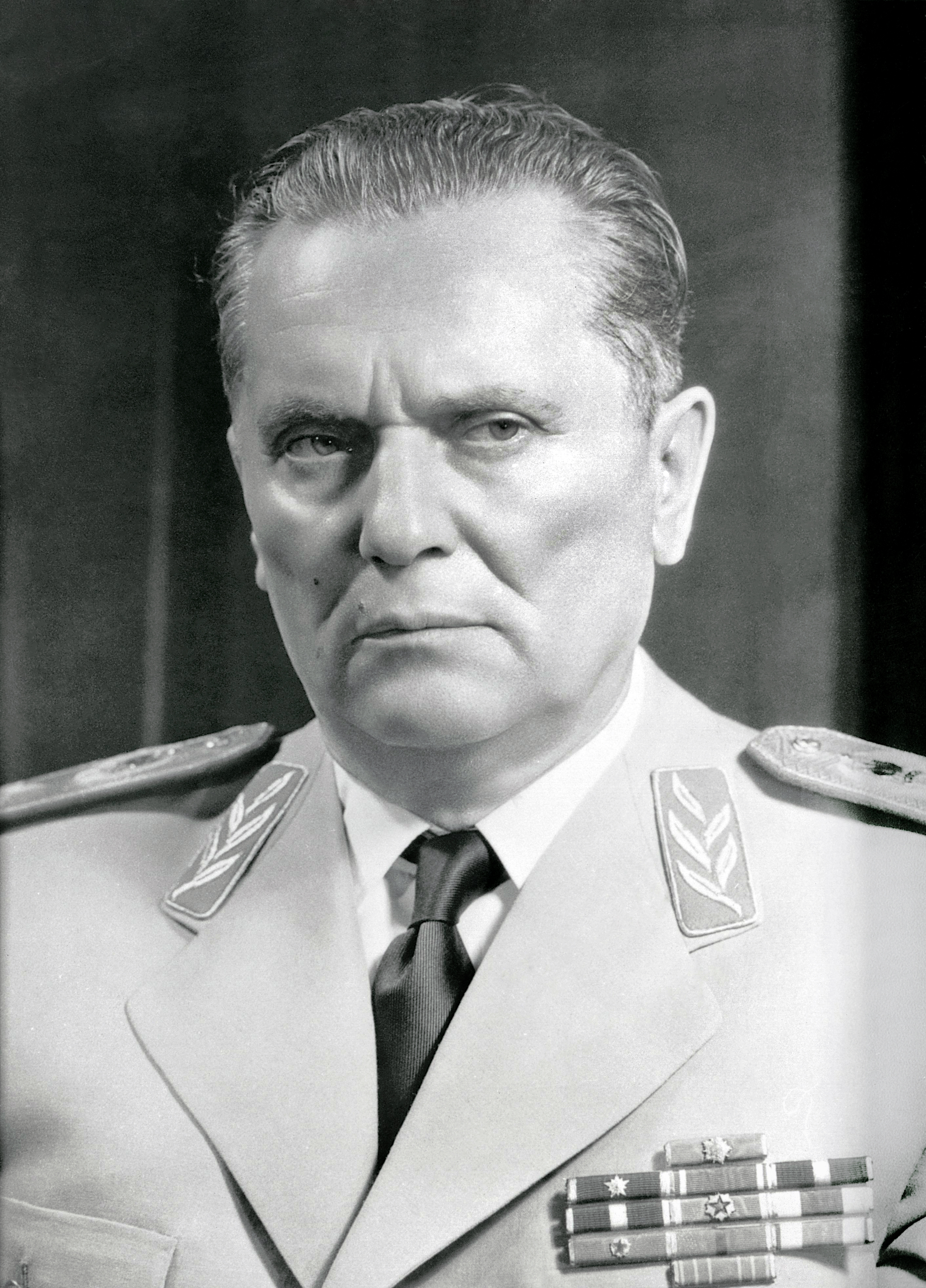
- Josip Broz Tito
- Residence: White Palace, Belgrade
- Appointer: Federal Assembly of SFR Yugoslavia
- Term length: Four years, renewable once consecutively (until 1974) (Note: Josip Broz Tito explicitly exempted from term limits) Unlimited (after 1974)
- Precursor: President of the Presidency of the National Assembly
- Formation: 14 January 1953
- First holder: Josip Broz Tito
- Final holder: Josip Broz Tito
- Abolished: 4 May 1980
- Succession: President of the Presidency

The president of the Socialist Federal Republic of Yugoslavia was the head of state of that country from 14 January 1953 to 4 May 1980. Josip Broz Tito was the only person to occupy the office. Tito was also concurrently President of the League of Communists of Yugoslavia. Tito was eventually declared president for life and with his death in 1980 the office was discontinued and the new office of President of the Presidency of Yugoslavia took its place.

The 1946 constitution defined the government of Yugoslavia headed by a president (commonly known as prime minister) as the highest administrative authority in the country. Tito served as Prime Minister during the entire period up to adoption of the 1953 constitution. This law proclaimed the country to be a socialist republic and removed all previous references to a government, ministries, etc. Instead it defined the office of president and the Federal Executive Council (FEC) in place of the government. The president was to serve as head of state and would also preside over the FEC, a body of 30–40 members, some of whom would be selected to be federal secretaries. Tito moved from the position of prime minister to president on 14 January 1953 and was re-elected on 29 January 1954 and 19 April 1958.

The 1963 constitution specifically gave Tito an unlimited number of terms. It also defined a new office of President of the Federal Executive Council which would head that institution rather than the president. Tito could still convene the Federal Executive Council, remained head of state and commander-in-chief of the Yugoslav People's Army, and concurrently still served as head of the communist party. He was re-elected by the Federal Assembly under this system again in 1963 and 1968.

Constitutional amendments in 1971 created a new collective presidency consisting of republican representatives, still presided over by the president of the Republic. The 1974 constitution gave the then 82-year old Tito an unlimited mandate, making him president-for-life. It also created a new rotating office of President of the Presidency which would take effect in the event of Tito's death. The sitting vice president of the Presidency would succeed him in this case. This eventually occurred on 4 May 1980 when Lazar Koliševski became the first president of the presidency upon Tito's death.

== List of presidents of the Socialist Federal Republic of Yugoslavia ==
League of Communists of Yugoslavia (SKJ)

No.	Portrait	President	Took office	Left office	Time in office	Party
1	Josip Broz Tito	Marshal of Yugoslavia; Josip Broz Tito (1892–1980)	14 January 1953	4 May 1980 †	27 years, 111 days	SKJ

== See also ==
- President of the Presidency of Yugoslavia
- List of heads of state of Yugoslavia
