= 1958 Yugoslavian parliamentary election =

- 23–30 March 1958

All seats in the Federal Council All seats in the Council of Producers
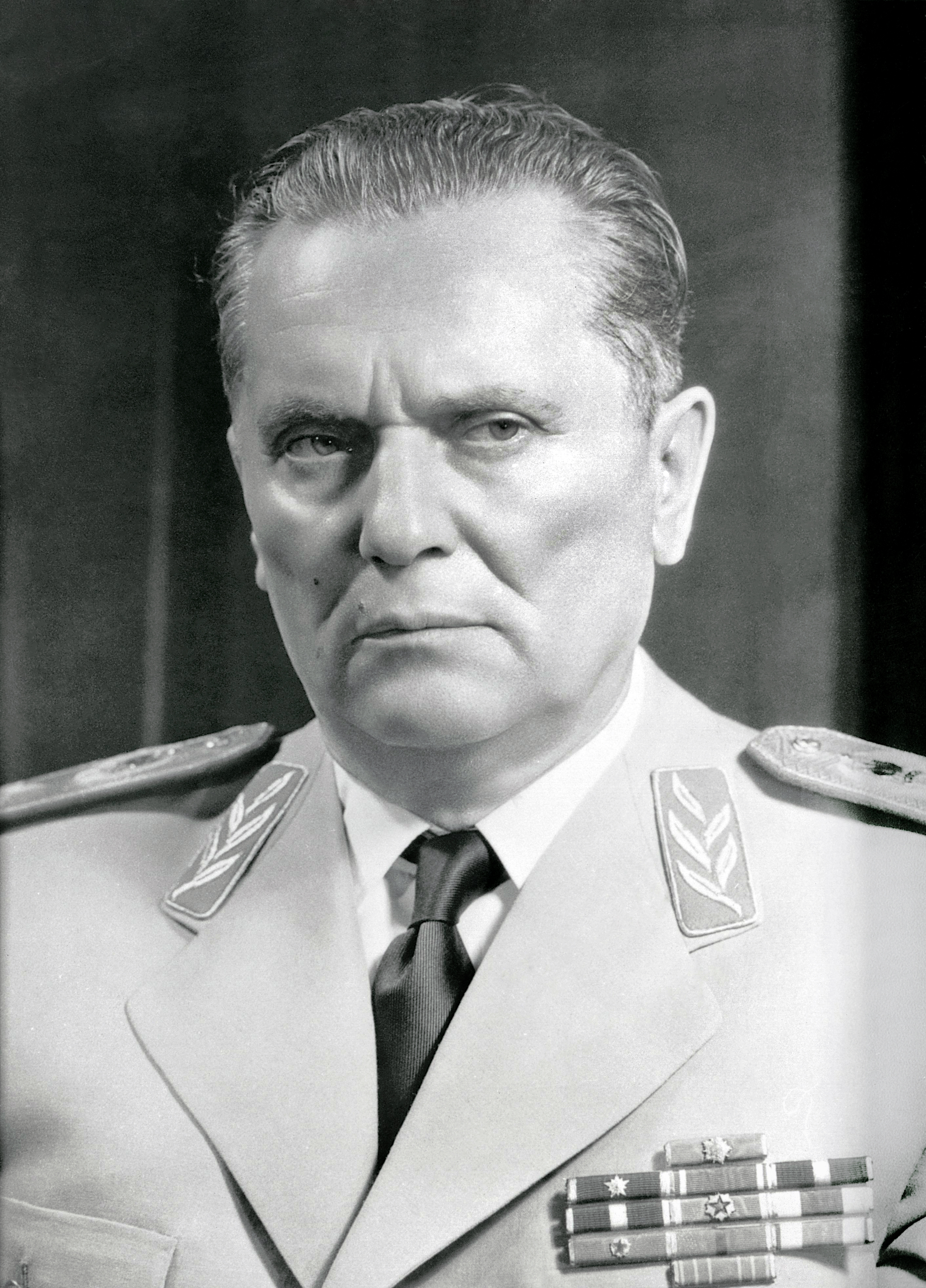
	First party
Leader	Josip Broz Tito
Party	SKJ
Alliance	SSRNJ
President of the Republic before election
Josip Broz Tito
SKJ
President of the Republic after election
Josip Broz Tito
SKJ

Parliamentary elections were held in Yugoslavia, with voting on 23 March 1958 for the 301-member Federal Council, whilst the Producers' Council was elected on 30 March, with the two councils forming the bicameral Federal People's Assembly.

Almost all candidates ran unopposed, with only six of the 301 seats in the Federal Council having been contested by more than one candidate. Around 40% of the candidates for the Federal Council and 80% of candidates for the Producers' Council were running for the first time.

== Results ==
=== Federal Council ===
Party	Votes	%	Seats
Socialist Alliance of Working People	10,312,266	100.00	301
Total	10,312,266	100.00	301
Valid votes	10,312,266	96.73	
Invalid/blank votes	348,212	3.27	
Total votes	10,660,478	100.00	
Registered voters/turnout	11,331,727	94.08	
Source: Sternberger et al.
