= Džemal Bijedić =

Bosnian and Yugoslav politician

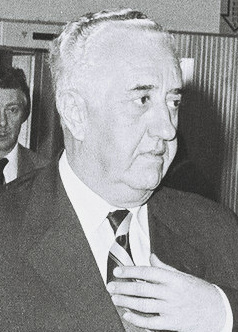
- Bijedić in 1976

23rd Prime Minister of Yugoslavia President of the Federal Executive Council
- In office 30 July 1971 – 18 January 1977
- President: Josip Broz Tito
- Preceded by: Mitja Ribičič
- Succeeded by: Veselin Đuranović

3rd President of the People's Assembly of SR Bosnia and Herzegovina
- In office 1967 – 30 July 1971
- Preceded by: Ratomir Dugonjić
- Succeeded by: Hamdija Pozderac
Ministerial offices
Secretary of the Interior
In office 30 July 1971 – 3 December 1971
Prime Minister	Himself
Preceded by	Radovan Stijačić
Succeeded by	Luka Banović

Personal details
- Born: 12 April 1917 Mostar, Bosnia and Herzegovina, Austria-Hungary
- Died: 18 January 1977 (aged 59) near Kreševo, SR Bosnia and Herzegovina, SFR Yugoslavia
- Party: League of Communists of Yugoslavia
- Spouse: Razija Bijedić
- Children: 3
- Education: University of Belgrade

Džemal Bijedić (Cyrillic: Џемал Биједић, Bosnian pronunciation: [bijěːdit͡ɕ]; 12 April 1917 – 18 January 1977) was a Bosnian and Yugoslav politician who served as Prime Minister of Yugoslavia from July 1971 until his death in a plane crash in January 1977. He additionally served as Secretary of the Interior from July to December 1971. Bijedić was also President of the People's Assembly of SR Bosnia and Herzegovina from 1967 to 1971.

== Early life and education ==
Bijedić was born on 12 April 1917 in Mostar, Bosnia and Herzegovina (then part of Austria-Hungary) to Adem and Zarifa from the prominent Bosnian Muslim merchant family of Bajramaga Bijedić, who had moved from Gacko to Mostar in 1915. Džemal was barely one year old when his father Adem died of the Spanish flu in 1919; his mother Zafira and uncle Bećir took care of the family in the 1920s.

Bijedić finished his elementary and secondary education in Mostar, and graduated from the University of Belgrade Faculty of Law, where he joined the Communist Party of Yugoslavia in 1939. He became a member of SKOJ in October 1939 and a member of the Mostar branch of the League of Communists just two months later. Due to his political sympathies, he was three times detained when in Mostar.

== Early career ==
In a documentary produced by Face TV, Mišo Marić claims that Bijedić joined the anti-communist Croatian Home Guard in April 1941, following the directives of the Communist Party of Yugoslavia, as a lieutenant with the alias of Ante Jukić. Another documentary about Bijedić produced by Federalna televizija shows (at 15:34) a photo of Bijedić dressed in a military uniform with Croatian Home Guard collar insignia. The same photo was shown at the beginning of the first documentary (01:27), but the insignia was painted over with Partisans' red star in colour. It is also mentioned that Bijedić joined the Yugoslav Partisans in February 1943.

== Political career ==
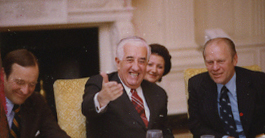
Bijedić with U.S. President Gerald Ford, 19 March 1975

After the liberation of Yugoslavia, Bijedić held many political roles, including as deputy Minister of Internal Affairs in the government of the Socialist Republic of Bosnia and Herzegovina. He played a key role in the affirmation of the Muslims as a Yugoslav constitutive nation.

Significant progress in the economy of Herzegovina was made under Bijedić's leadership, with the establishment of heavy industry such as the Aluminijum Kombinat, and the modernization of the Sarajevo–Ploče railway.

Bijedić served as President of the People's Assembly of SR Bosnia and Herzegovina from 1967 to July 1971 and as President of the Federal Executive Council of SFR Yugoslavia from 30 July 1971 to his death on 18 January 1977.

== Death ==
On 18 January 1977, Bijedić, his wife Razija, and six others were killed when their Learjet 25 crashed on the Inač mountain near Kreševo, Bosnia and Herzegovina. The plane took off from Batajnica Air Base in Belgrade and was en route to Sarajevo when it crashed, ostensibly due to poor weather conditions. Some have claimed that the crash was the result of foul play at the hands of his rivals, as he was considered a potential successor to an old and ailing Tito. Bahrudin Bijedić, a close relative of Džemal Bijedić and a former long-serving diplomat and Yugoslav consul in the United States—who also held the position of Minister of Internal Affairs in the Socialist Republic of Bosnia and Herzegovina—has claimed that the Yugoslav Prime Minister was the victim of an assassination. His assertion was supported by Colonel Lazo Vukosavljević of the Yugoslav People's Army (JNA), formerly the commander of a helicopter unit stationed in Jasenica near Mostar. Vukosavljević, an aeronautical electrical engineer by training, testified that upon arriving at the crash site, he noticed technical malfunctions in the aircraft's altimeter and airspeed indicator, both of which had been showing a higher altitude than the aircraft's actual position. While examining the recovered instruments, Vukosavljević commented aloud that the readings on the altimeters and airspeed indicators were displaying unusual and inconsistent values. After this, he was immediately ordered to leave the crash site by KOS (Yugoslav military counterintelligence service) operatives.

Bijedić and his wife were survived by their two sons, Dragan and Milenko, and one daughter, Azra.

== Legacy ==
The university in Mostar was renamed Džemal Bijedić University in his honour. His birthplace was also turned into a museum. An exhibition about Bijedić was held in Mostar in 2016.

Political offices
Preceded by Mitja Ribičič	Prime Minister of Yugoslavia; 1971–1977	Succeeded by Veselin Đuranović
