= Veselin Đuranović =

President of the Presidency of Yugoslavia (1925–1997)

- Веселин Ђурановић
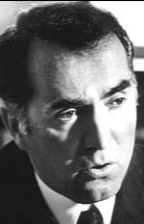
- Đuranović in 1966

6th President of the Presidency of Yugoslavia
- In office 15 May 1984 – 15 May 1985
- Prime Minister: Milka Planinc
- Preceded by: Mika Špiljak
- Succeeded by: Radovan Vlajković

9th President of the Presidency of SR Montenegro
- In office 7 May 1982 – 7 May 1983
- Preceded by: Veljko Milatović
- Succeeded by: Marko Orlandić

24th Prime Minister of Yugoslavia President of the Federal Executive Council
- In office 18 January 1977 – 16 May 1982
- Preceded by: Džemal Bijedić
- Succeeded by: Milka Planinc

4th Prime Minister of SR Montenegro
- In office 25 June 1963 – 8 December 1966
- Preceded by: Đorđije Pajković
- Succeeded by: Mijuško Šibalić

Personal details
- Born: 17 May 1925 Danilovgrad, Kingdom of Serbs, Croats and Slovenes
- Died: 30 August 1997 (aged 72) Podgorica, Montenegro, FR Yugoslavia
- Party: League of Communists

Veselin Đuranović (Serbo-Croatian Cyrillic: Веселин Ђурановић: 17 May 1925 – 30 August 1997) was a Yugoslav communist politician who served as President of the Presidency of Yugoslavia from 1984 to 1985. He also served as President of the Presidency of SR Montenegro from 1982 to 1983. Đuranović previously succeeded Džemal Bijedić as Prime Minister of Yugoslavia in 1977 following his death, serving until 1982.

== Biography ==
Đuranović was born near Danilovgrad, in what was then the Kingdom of Serbs, Croats and Slovenes. He served as the chairman of the executive council of Montenegro from 1963 to 1966. He then served as chairman of the Central Committee of the League of Communists of Montenegro from 1968 to 77. In 1977, he moved into Yugoslav national politics, serving as president of the Executive Council of Yugoslavia from 1977 to 1982.

Đuranović made a state visit to Czechoslovakia in October 1977, where he met with Prime Minister Lubomír Štrougal.

He then served as chairman of the Presidency of Montenegro from 1982 to 1983. He became the member for Montenegro of the collective presidency of Yugoslavia, and served as chairman of the Presidency of Yugoslavia from 1984 to 1985. In 1989, Montenegro's entire government and Communist League Central Committee resigned, including Đuranović.

== See also ==
- League of Communists of Montenegro
  - President of the League of Communists of Montenegro

Political offices
Preceded by Mika Špiljak	President of the Presidency of Yugoslavia; 1984–1985	Succeeded by Radovan Vlajković
Preceded by Džemal Bijedić	Prime Minister of Yugoslavia; 1977–1982	Succeeded by Milka Planinc
Preceded by Veljko Milatović	President of the Presidency of SR Montenegro; 1982–1983	Succeeded by Marko Orlandić
Preceded by Đorđije Pajković	President of the Executive Council of SR Montenegro; 1963–1966	Succeeded by Mijuško Šibalić
Party political offices
Preceded by Đorđije Pajković	Chairman of the Central Committee of the League of Communists of Montenegro; 1968–1977	Succeeded by Vojo Srzentić
