= Milka Planinc =

Croatian politician (1924–2010)

- Милка Планинц

25th Prime Minister of Yugoslavia President of the Federal Executive Council
- In office 16 May 1982 – 15 May 1986
- President: Petar Stambolić; Mika Špiljak; Veselin Đuranović; Radovan Vlajković
- Preceded by: Veselin Đuranović
- Succeeded by: Branko Mikulić

7th President of the League of Communists of Croatia
- In office 14 December 1971 – 16 May 1982
- Preceded by: Savka Dabčević-Kučar
- Succeeded by: Jure Bilić

Personal details
- Born: Milka Malada; 21 November 1924 Drniš, Kingdom of Serbs, Croats and Slovenes (modern Croatia)
- Died: 7 October 2010 (aged 85) Zagreb, Croatia
- Party: League of Communists
- Spouse: Zvonko Planinc (m. 1950; died 1993)
- Children: 2

Milka Planinc (née Malada; pronounced [mîːlka plǎnint͡s]; 21 November 1924 – 7 October 2010) was a Yugoslav communist politician who served as Prime Minister of Yugoslavia from 1982 to 1986. She was the first and only woman to hold this office. Planinc was also the first female head of government of a diplomatically recognized socialist state in Europe.

== Early life ==
Planinc was born Milka Malada in a mixed ethnic Croat and ethnic Serb family in Žitnić, a small village near Drniš, Dalmatia in modern-day Croatia. She attended school until the onset of World War II interrupted her education. She joined the League of Communist Youth in 1941, which was a pivotal year in Planinc's life and for her country. Nazi Germany invaded Yugoslavia and divided the country among German, Italian, Hungarian, and Bulgarian occupying authorities. Soon a resistance movement known as the Partisans was formed, led by Josip Broz Tito. Planinc waited impatiently for the day when she would be old enough to join the Anti-Fascist Council for the National Liberation of Yugoslavia.

Aged 19, Planinc joined the partisans and became extremely devoted to Tito. In 1944 she joined the League of Communists of Yugoslavia. She became county commissar of the 11th Dalmatian Strike Brigade whose job it was to teach party principles and policies, and ensure party loyalty. Planinc spent years working for the partisans and the Communist Party, and when they gained control of the entire region she enrolled in the Higher School of Administration in Zagreb to continue her education. Partisan commander Simo Dubajić, himself accused of war crimes, later alleged that Planinc was involved with the post-war Kočevski Rog massacre. Planinc rejected Dubajić's accusations, calling them political speculation. She personally advocated that these crimes be investigated, and judicially and scientifically processed.

In 1950, she married an engineer named Zvonko Planinc. The couple had a son and a daughter.

== Political career ==
Planinc began to pursue a full-time career within the League of Communists of Croatia. She specialized in education, agitation, and propaganda, and in 1959 she was elected into the Croatian Central Committee, the executive body.

Having served in a variety of posts in Zagreb, as the Secretary of the People's Assembly of Trešnjevka in 1957 and then the Secretary of Cultural Affairs of the City of Zagreb in 1961, she became the Secretary of the City of Zagreb League of Communists Committee, and the Secretary for Education of the Socialist Republic of Croatia in 1963, a position in which she remained until 1965.

Greater party acknowledgement did not come until 1966 when she was elected into the Presidium of the League of Communists of Croatia (LCC), and then to the executive committee of the LCC in 1968. She served as the President of the Assembly of the Socialist Republic of Croatia 1967–1971.

After the events of Croatian Spring, the leadership of LCC was removed, and Planinc became president of the Central Committee in 1971. She made the decision to arrest Franjo Tuđman, Marko Veselica, Dražen Budiša, Šime Đodan and Vlado Gotovac, among others, who had all participated in the Croatian Spring. She remained the Leader of the League of Communists of Croatia until 1982.

When Tito died in 1980, he left a plan for a rotating presidency, with the leader coming from each federal unit in turn. On 29 April 1982, the Federal Conference of the Socialist Alliance of Working People of Yugoslavia approved a list of ministers submitted by Planinc, and on 15 May 1982 a joint session of the National Assembly's two houses named her head of the Federal Executive Council; thus she became prime minister. She became the first woman to occupy such a high post in the country's 64-year history. Planinc assembled a new cabinet, which consisted of 29 members. All of the members of this committee were new, except for five that were members of the old committee.

She would serve as the President of the Federal Executive Council (prime minister) of Yugoslavia between 1982 and 1986. Her mandate as prime minister was remembered as the times when the government finally decided to regulate external debt of SFR Yugoslavia and to start to pay it back. In order to achieve necessary means, her cabinet implemented restrictive economic measures for a few years.

The 1974 Yugoslav Constitution had left the central government with very little authority, as the power was divided into the separate republics. Planinc tried to re-focus the central government and gain international alliances with visits to Britain, the United States, and Soviet Union. Though her visits to Washington gave her promises of economic support, her visit to Moscow was said to be with "nothing lost, and nothing gained".

Planinc offered her resignation in October 1985, but this was not accepted. On 12 February 1986 Planinc's government submitted a request to the International Monetary Fund for advanced surveillance. The request was approved a month later. Her term ended in May 1986, and before long she became a member of the Central Committee of the League of Communists of Yugoslavia.

== Later life ==
Planinc spent the rest of her time living through Yugoslav Wars with the collapse of communism in Europe. In 1993 her husband died, and in 1994 her son Zoran committed suicide.

From the late 1990s until her death, Planinc required the use of a wheelchair and rarely left her home. She resided in Zagreb until her death on 7 October 2010, aged 85. She was interred at the Zagreb's Mirogoj Cemetery.

Party political offices
Preceded by Savka Dabčević-Kučar	President of the League of Communists of Croatia; 1971–1982	Succeeded by Jure Bilić
Political offices
Preceded by Veselin Đuranović	Prime Minister of Yugoslavia; 1982–1986	Succeeded by Branko Mikulić
