= Federal Executive Council of the Socialist Federal Republic of Yugoslavia =

The Federal Executive Council (FEC, Serbo-Croatian, Savezno izvršno vijeće (SIV), Савезно извршно веће (СИВ)) was the chief executive body and nominal cabinet of the Socialist Federal Republic of Yugoslavia (SFRY). It was responsible for state affairs and for supervising the implementation of laws. It consisted of up to 15 members elected by the Federal Assembly on the nomination of the President of Yugoslavia (later the Presidency of Yugoslavia) for a four-year term. In addition to the President of the Federal Executive Council existed the presidents of executive councils of republics and provinces. The Federal Executive Council played an important role in the Government of the SFRY from its creation in 1953 until the breakup of Yugoslavia in 1992.

== Structure ==
The FEC was led by a President (also called Prime Minister, especially outside Yugoslavia) and two vice presidents (deputy prime ministers), who were elected by the SFRY Assembly on the nomination of the Presidency. Council members (also called secretariats) were elected to equally represent the six republics of Yugoslavia, as well as the two autonomous regions in Serbia, Kosovo and Vojvodina. Both the President and council members of the FEC served terms of four years. The FEC President could not serve more than two consecutive terms, however council members were allowed to serve up to 3 terms under certain statutes. Elections for a new Federal Executive Council would take place after the creation of each new Federal Assembly and their respective constitutions. Alternatively, the Federal Executive Council could be removed from office prematurely if the Federal Assembly passed a vote of no confidence or if the President of the Council resigned. Members of the FEC automatically resigned their seats in the legislature when elected. The FEC President had the right to call a meeting of the council at any time. The President of the Republic, the Presidency or at least five council members also had the right to call a meeting as well.

The council was composed of six federal secretariats:

- People's Defence
- Foreign Affairs
- Internal Affairs
- Finances
- Justice
- Freight Transport

The Committee for Foreign Trade and 12 internal secretariats in:

- Administration
- Directorates
- Administrative institutions
- Inspectorates
- Commissions

The Federal Executive Council as a whole was considered a cabinet if one was to compare SFR Yugoslavia to other countries at the time. The federal secretariats were the equivalent of ministries in other countries.

== Responsibilities ==
The FEC was responsible for most day to day tasks of the S.F.R.Y assembly. These included reviewing policy set by the S.F.R.Y Assembly, creation of federal bills to be submitted to the S.F.R.Y assembly, submission of budget regulations for the Federal Budget, and adopting regulations to enforce Federal Statutes.

The creation of legislation could take the FEC about a year before it is sent to the Federal Assembly. In the 1970s, the FEC was behind the creation of legislation tackling controversial issues in Yugoslavia regarding the six republics. The FEC was one of the few bureaucratic bodies in Yugoslavia that had access to reliable information needed to create effective policies. The 1974 Constitution of Yugoslavia also gave the FEC the right to appoint council members to the new state presidency, which became the administration and command authority for the Yugoslav People's Army. They would appoint the councils of state security, national defense, foreign policy, and protection of the constitutional order.

== History ==
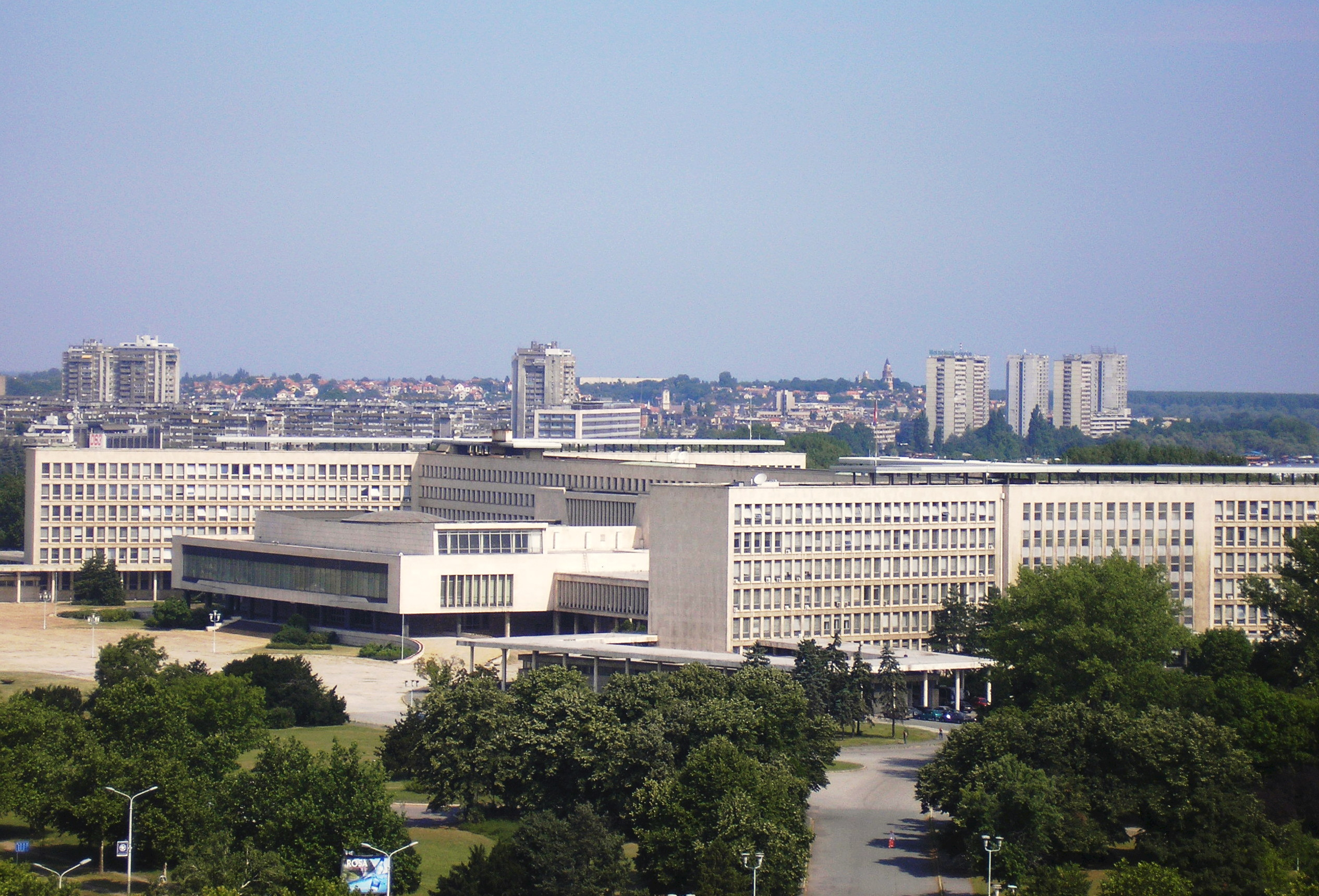
SIV 1, seat of the Federal Executive Council

=== Notable events ===
During the 1953 revision of the Yugoslav Constitution, Josip Broz Tito was elected President of the Republic, who under the terms of the revised constitution was ex officio president of the new FEC, by a vote of 568-1. Under these revisions, the Yugoslav Government was to function without the Parliament until new elections could take place in the Spring of 1954. The Parliament selected thirty of its own members to serve in the FEC.

In 1962, the League of Communists of Yugoslavia planned a restructuring of the Yugoslav Government. They planned to add a "top council" led by a premier that would take over the role of the FEC, effectively dissolving the council. Any member in this new council could be removed by the Parliament at any time. The 1963 Yugoslav Constitution allowed a new council to be created, but did not dissolve the FEC. Instead, this new council would play a more local role, focusing on culture, social welfare, and public administration in the six republics. Up until 1963, the President of the Council was held simultaneously by the President of the Socialist Federal Republic of Yugoslavia. After 1963, the president was separately elected by the Federal Assembly, with the President of the Federal Executive Council becoming a separate post. No government official could hold two office positions at the same time after the 1963 Constitution excluding Tito, who was also not held to the term limits mandated for either post.

The Council was housed in the SIV 1 building in Belgrade.

After Tito's death in 1980, many of the six republics began to demand more autonomy and were voicing their interest more aggressively. To try and settle negotiations, the FEC relied heavily on temporary measures outlined in the constitution. These measures could not be blocked by protesting delegations and could only be overturned by unanimous decision of the delegations. These measures, that were only supposed to be used for shot-term periods, were used extensively for long periods of time. The FEC's failure to create effective long-term legislation could be seen as one of the many factors leading up to the breakup of Yugoslavia.

== Councils ==
=== Second Federal Executive Council of Josip Broz Tito ===
The Second Federal Executive Council of Josip Broz Tito was Yugoslavia's national government from 30 January 1954 to 19 April 1958. Josip Broz Tito was its president, simultaneously also serving as president of the republic and president of the party.

Portfolio	Member	Took office	Left office	Party	Notes
President
President	Josip Broz Tito	30 January 1954	19 April 1958	SKJ	People's Hero - 6 November 1944
Vice-Presidents
Vice-President	Edvard Kardelj	30 January 1954	19 April 1958	SKJ	People's Hero - 20 December 1951
Vice-President	Aleksandar Ranković	30 January 1954	19 April 1958	SKJ	People's Hero - 4 July 1945
Vice-President	Svetozar Vukmanović	30 January 1954	19 April 1958	SKJ	People's Hero - 20 December 1951
Vice-President	Rodoljub Čolaković	30 January 1954	19 April 1958	SKJ	People's Hero - 27 November 1953
State Secretaries
Foreign Affairs	Koča Popović	30 January 1954	19 April 1958	SKJ	People's Hero - 27 November 1953
National Defense	Ivan Gošnjak	30 January 1954	19 April 1958	SKJ	People's Hero - 17 November 1953
Interior	Svetislav Stefanović	30 January 1954	19 April 1958	SKJ	People's Hero - 27 November 1953
National Economy	Hasan Brkić	30 January 1954	1955	SKJ	People's Hero - 27 November 1953
National Economy	Ivica Gretić	1955	1956	SKJ	
Budget & State Administration	Neda Božinović	30 January 1954	1956	SKJ	Married to People's Hero Dobrivoje Radosavljević.
Finance	Avdo Humo	1956	19 April 1958	SKJ	People's Hero - 27 November 1953
Commodity Trade	Marijan Brecelj	1956	19 April 1958	SKJ	People's Hero - 27 November 1953
Chairs
Foreign Trade	Hasan Brkić	1956	19 April 1958	SKJ	People's Hero - 27 November 1953

=== Third Federal Executive Council of Josip Broz Tito ===
The Third Federal Executive Council of Josip Broz Tito was Yugoslavia's national government from 19 April 1958 to 29 June 1963. Josip Broz Tito was its president, simultaneously also serving as national president and general secretary of the League of Communists of Yugoslavia.

Portfolio	Member	Took office	Left office	Party	Notes
President
President	Josip Broz Tito	19 April 1958	29 June 1963	SKJ	People's Hero - 6 November 1944
Vice-Presidents
Vice-President	Edvard Kardelj	19 April 1958	29 June 1963	SKJ	People's Hero - 20 December 1951
Vice-President	Aleksandar Ranković	19 April 1958	18 April 1963	SKJ	Resigned in April 1963 to become state Vice-President. People's Hero - 4 July 1945
Vice-President	Svetislav Stefanović	18 April 1963	29 June 1963	SKJ	Replaced Aleksandar Ranković in April 1963. People's Hero - 27 November 1953
Vice-President	Mijalko Todorović	19 April 1958	29 June 1963	SKJ	People's Hero - 5 July 1952
Vice-President	Rodoljub Čolaković	19 April 1958	29 June 1963	SKJ	People's Hero - 27 November 1953
State Secretaries
Foreign Affairs	Koča Popović	19 April 1958	29 June 1963	SKJ	People's Hero - 27 November 1953
National Defense	Ivan Gošnjak	19 April 1958	29 June 1963	SKJ	People's Hero - 17 November 1953
Interior	Svetislav Stefanović	19 April 1958	18 April 1963	SKJ	People's Hero - 27 November 1953
Interior	Vojin Lukić	18 April 1963	29 June 1963	SKJ	Replaced Svetislav Stefanović in April 1963. People's Hero - 27 November 1953
Finance	Nikola Minčev	19 April 1958	1962	SKJ	
Finance	Kiro Gligorov	1962	29 June 1963	SKJ	
Commodity Trade	Marijan Brecelj	19 April 1958	18 April 1963	SKJ	People's Hero - 27 November 1953
Commodity Trade	Dragutin Kosovac	18 April 1963	29 June 1963	SKJ	
Foreign Trade	Nikola Džuverović	18 April 1963	29 June 1963	SKJ	
Chairs
Foreign Trade	Ljubo Babić	19 April 1958	1960	SKJ	
Foreign Trade	Sergej Kraigher	1960	18 April 1963	SKJ	Committee promoted to secretariat in April 1963.

==== Members ex officio ====
Portfolio	Member	Took office	Left office	Party	Notes
Member	Osman Karabegović	19 April 1958	29 June 1963	SKJ	President of the Executive Council of PR Bosnia and Herzegovina.
Member	Jakov Blažević	19 April 1958	10 July 1962	SKJ	President of the Executive Council of PR Croatia.
Member	Zvonko Brkić	19 April 1958	29 June 1963	SKJ	President of the Executive Council of PR Croatia.
Member	Ljupčo Arsov	19 April 1958	1961	SKJ	President of the Executive Council of PR Macedonia.
Member	Aleksandar Grličkov	1961	29 June 1963	SKJ	President of the Executive Council of PR Macedonia.
Member	Filip Bajković	19 April 1958	12 July 1962	SKJ	President of the Executive Council of PR Montenegro.
Member	Đorđije Pajković	12 July 1962	29 June 1963	SKJ	President of the Executive Council of PR Montenegro.
Member	Miloš Minić	19 April 1958	9 June 1962	SKJ	President of the Executive Council of PR Serbia.
Member	Slobodan Penezić Krcun	9 June 1962	29 June 1963	SKJ	President of the Executive Council of PR Serbia.
Member	Boris Kraigher	19 April 1958	25 June 1962	SKJ	President of the Executive Council of PR Slovenia.
Member	Viktor Avbelj	25 June 1962	29 June 1963	SKJ	President of the Executive Council of PR Slovenia.

=== First Federal Executive Council of Džemal Bijedić ===
The First Federal Executive Council of Džemal Bijedić was the Socialist Federal Republic of Yugoslavia's national government from 30 July 1971 to 16 May 1974.

Portfolio	Member	Took office	Left office	Party	Representing
President
President	Džemal Bijedić	30 July 1971	17 May 1974	SKJ	N/A (SR Bosnia and Herzegovina)
Republican Representatives
Vice-President	Jakov Sirotković	30 July 1971	17 May 1974	SKJ	SR Croatia
Vice-President	Anton Vratuša	3 December 1971	17 May 1974	SKJ	SR Slovenia
Member	Momčilo Cemović	30 July 1971	17 May 1974	SKJ	SR Montenegro
Member	Dušan Gligorijević	30 July 1971	17 May 1974	SKJ	SR Serbia
Member	Trpe Jakovlevski	30 July 1971	17 May 1974	SKJ	SR Macedonia
Member	Ivo Jerkić	30 July 1971	17 May 1974	SKJ	SR Bosnia and Herzegovina
Member	Borisav Jović	30 July 1971	17 May 1974	SKJ	SR Serbia
Member	Mirjana Krstinić	30 July 1971	17 May 1974	SKJ	SR Croatia
Member	Emil Ludviger	30 July 1971	12 July 1973	SKJ	SR Croatia
Member	Marko Orlandic	30 July 1971	17 May 1974	SKJ	SR Montenegro
Member	Blagoj Popov	30 July 1971	3 December 1971	SKJ	SR Macedonia
Member	Nikola Stojanović	3 December 1971	17 May 1974	SKJ	SR Bosnia and Herzegovina
Member	Imer Pula	30 July 1971	17 May 1974	SKJ	AP Kosovo
Member	Geza Tikvicki	30 July 1971	12 July 1973	SKJ	AP Vojvodina
Member	Anton Vratuša	30 July 1971	3 December 1971	SKJ	SR Slovenia
Member	Dragan Milojević	3 December 1971	17 May 1974	SKJ	SR Serbia
State Secretaries
Foreign Affairs	Mirko Tepavac	3 December 1971	1 November 1972	SKJ	N/A (AP Vojvodina)
Foreign Affairs	Jakša Petrić	1 November 1972	5 December 1972	SKJ	N/A (SR Croatia)
Foreign Affairs	Miloš Minić	5 December 1972	17 May 1974	SKJ	N/A (SR Serbia)
National Defense	Nikola Ljubičić	30 July 1971	17 May 1974	SKJ	N/A (SR Serbia)
Interior	Džemal Bijedić	30 July 1971	3 December 1971	SKJ	N/A (SR Bosnia and Herzegovina)
Interior	Luka Banovic	3 December 1971	17 May 1974	SKJ	N/A (SR Montenegro)
Finance	Janko Smole	30 July 1971	17 May 1974	SKJ	N/A (SR Slovenia)
Foreign Trade	Muhamed Hadžić	30 July 1971	12 July 1973	SKJ	N/A (SR Bosnia and Herzegovina)
Foreign Trade	Emil Ludviger	12 July 1973	17 May 1974	SKJ	N/A (SR Croatia)
Economy	Boško Dimitrijević	30 July 1971	17 May 1974	SKJ	N/A (SR Serbia)
Justice	Boris Snuderl	30 July 1971	3 December 1971	SKJ	N/A (SR Slovenia)
Justice	Mugbil Bejzat	3 December 1971	17 May 1974	SKJ	N/A (SR Macedonia)
Labour & Social Policy	Vuko Dragašević	30 July 1971	17 May 1974	SKJ	N/A (SR Montenegro)
Agriculture	Ivo Kuštrak	30 July 1971	17 May 1974	SKJ	N/A (SR Croatia)
Transport & Communication	Blagoj Popov	30 July 1971	17 May 1974	SKJ	N/A (SR Macedonia)
Federal Executive Council	Ivan Franko	30 July 1971	17 May 1974	SKJ	N/A (SR Slovenia)

=== Second Federal Executive Council of Džemal Bijedić ===
The Second Federal Executive Council of Džemal Bijedić was the Socialist Federal Republic of Yugoslavia's national government from 16 May 1974 to 16 May 1978. Džemal Bijedić was its first president until his death on 18 January 1977. He was subsequently replaced by Veselin Đuranović as president on 15 March to the end of the Federal Executive Council's four-year term.

Portfolio	Member	Took office	Left office	Party	Representing
President
President	Džemal Bijedić	30 July 1971	18 January 1977	SKJ	N/A (SR Bosnia and Herzegovina)
President	Veselin Đuranović	15 March 1977	16 May 1978	SKJ	N/A (SR Montenegro)
Republican Representatives
Vice-President	Miloš Minić	16 May 1974	16 May 1978	SKJ	SR Serbia
Vice-President	Berislav Šefer	16 May 1974	16 May 1978	SKJ	SR Croatia
Vice-President	Anton Vratuša	16 May 1974	16 May 1978	SKJ	SR Slovenia
Vice-President	Dobroslav Ćulafić	16 May 1974	16 May 1978	SKJ	SR Montenegro
Member	Mugbil Bejzat	16 May 1974	16 May 1978	SKJ	SR Macedonia
Member	Asen Simitčiev	16 May 1974	16 May 1978	SKJ	SR Macedonia
Member	Ljubomir Marković	16 May 1974	16 May 1978	SKJ	SR Montenegro
Member	Borisav Jović	16 May 1974	16 May 1978	SKJ	SR Serbia
Member	Franjo Nađ	16 May 1974	16 May 1978	SKJ	SAP Vojvodina
Member	Radovan Pantović	16 May 1974	16 May 1978	SKJ	SR Serbia
Member	Aslan Fazlija	16 May 1974	16 May 1978	SKJ	SAP Kosovo
Member	Vajo Skendžić	16 May 1974	16 May 1982	SKJ	SR Croatia
Member	Janko Smole	16 May 1974	16 May 1978	SKJ	SR Slovenia
Member	Gojko Ubiparip	16 May 1974	16 May 1978	SKJ	SR Bosnia and Herzegovina
State Secretaries
Foreign Affairs	Miloš Minić	16 May 1974	16 May 1978	SKJ	N/A (SR Serbia)
National Defense	Nikola Ljubičić	18 May 1967	16 May 1982	SKJ	N/A (SR Serbia)
Interior	Franjo Herljević	16 May 1974	16 May 1982	SKJ	N/A (SR Bosnia and Herzegovina)
Finance	Momčilo Cemović	16 May 1974	16 May 1978	SKJ	N/A (SAP Montenegro)
Foreign Trade	Emil Ludviger	16 May 1974	16 May 1978	SKJ	N/A (SR Croatia)
Market and Prices	Imer Pulja	16 May 1974	16 May 1982	SKJ	N/A (SAP Kosovo)
Justice	Ivan Franko	16 May 1974	16 May 1978	SKJ	N/A (SR Slovenia)
Chairs
Information	Muhamed Berberović	16 May 1974	16 May 1978	SKJ	N/A (SR Bosnia and Herzegovina)
Energy & Industry	Dušan Ilijević	16 May 1974	16 May 1978	SKJ	N/A (SAP Vojvodina)
Agriculture	Ivan Kuštrak	16 May 1974	16 May 1978	SKJ	N/A (SR Croatia)
Transport & Communications	Boško Dimitrijević	16 May 1974	16 May 1978	SKJ	N/A (SR Serbia)
Labour, Health & Social Protection	Zora Tomić	16 May 1974	16 May 1978	SKJ	N/A (SR Slovenia)
Veterans & Disabled Persons	Mara Radić	16 May 1974	16 May 1978	SKJ	N/A (SR Bosnia and Herzegovina)
Tourism	Milan Vukasović	16 May 1974	16 May 1978	SKJ	N/A (SR Montenegro)
Economic Relations with Developing Countries	Stojan Andov	16 May 1974	16 May 1978	SKJ	N/A (SR Macedonia)
Labour and Employment	Svetozar Pepovski	16 May 1974	16 May 1978	SKJ	N/A (SR Macedonia)
Sciences and Culture	Trpe Jakovlevski	16 May 1974	16 May 1978	SKJ	N/A (SR Macedonia)
Social Planning	Milorad Birovljev	16 May 1974	16 May 1978	SKJ	N/A (SAP Vojvodina)
Legislation	Aleksandar Fira	16 May 1974	16 May 1982	SKJ	N/A (SR Serbia)

=== Federal Executive Council of Veselin Đuranović ===
The Federal Executive Council of Veselin Đuranović was the Yugoslavia's national government from 16 May 1978 to 16 May 1982. The federal executive council had 29 members. Veselin Đuranović was its president. Another 14 members represented the country's six republics (with two members each) and the two autonomous provinces (with one member each), serving as either vice-presidents or as members without portfolio. The remaining 14 members served as federal secretaries and chairmen.

Portfolio	Member	Took office	Left office	Party	Representing
President
President	Veselin Đuranović	16 May 1978	16 May 1982	SKJ	N/A (SR Montenegro)
Republican Representatives
Vice-President	Branislav Ikonić	16 May 1978	16 May 1982	SKJ	SR Serbia
Vice-President	Ivo Margan	16 May 1978	16 May 1982	SKJ	SR Croatia
Vice-President	Andrej Marinc	16 May 1978	16 May 1982	SKJ	SR Slovenia
Vice-President	Dragoljub Stavrev	16 May 1978	16 May 1982	SKJ	SR Macedonia
Vice-President	Gojko Ubiparip	16 May 1978	16 May 1982	SKJ	SR Bosnia and Herzegovina
Member	Stojan Andov	16 May 1978	16 May 1982	SKJ	SR Macedonia
Member	Vuko Dragašević	16 May 1978	16 May 1982	SKJ	SR Montenegro
Member	Slobodan Gligorijević	16 May 1978	16 May 1982	SKJ	SR Serbia
Member	Dušan Ilijević	16 May 1978	16 May 1982	SKJ	SAP Vojvodina
Member	Radoje Kontić	16 May 1978	16 May 1982	SKJ	SR Montenegro
Member	Bogoljub Nedeljković	16 May 1978	16 May 1982	SKJ	SAP Kosovo
Member	Vajo Skendžić	16 May 1978	16 May 1982	SKJ	SR Croatia
Member	Boris Snuderl	16 May 1978	16 May 1982	SKJ	SR Slovenia
Member	Šukrija Uzunović	16 May 1978	16 May 1982	SKJ	SR Bosnia and Herzegovina
State Secretaries
Foreign Affairs	Josip Vrhovec	16 May 1978	16 May 1982	SKJ	N/A (SR Croatia)
National Defense	Nikola Ljubičić	18 May 1967	16 May 1982	SKJ	N/A (SR Serbia)
Interior	Franjo Herljević	17 May 1974	16 May 1982	SKJ	N/A (SR Bosnia and Herzegovina)
Finance	Petar Kostić	16 May 1978	16 May 1982	SKJ	N/A (SAP Slovenia)
Foreign Trade	Metod Rotar	16 May 1978	16 May 1982	SKJ	N/A (SR Macedonia)
Market and Prices	Imer Pulja	16 May 1978	16 May 1982	SKJ	N/A (SAP Kosovo)
Justice	Luka Banović	16 May 1978	16 May 1982	SKJ	N/A (SR Montenegro)
Information	Ismail Bajra	16 May 1978	16 May 1982	SKJ	N/A (SAP Kosovo)
Chairs
Energy & Industry	Stojan Matkalijev	16 May 1978	11 May 1982	SKJ	N/A (SR Macedonia)
Agriculture	Milovan Zidar	16 May 1978	16 May 1982	SKJ	N/A (SR Slovenia)
Transport & Communications	Ante Zelić	16 May 1978	16 May 1982	SKJ	N/A (SR Croatia)
Labour, Health & Social Protection	Svetozar Pepovski	16 May 1978	16 May 1982	SKJ	N/A (SR Macedonia)
Veterans & Disabled Persons	Milan Vukasović	16 May 1978	16 May 1982	SKJ	N/A (SR Serbia)
Legislation	Aleksandar Fira	16 May 1978	16 May 1982	SKJ	N/A (SR Serbia)

=== Federal Executive Council of Milka Planinc ===
The Federal Executive Council of Milka Planinc was Yugoslavia's national government from 16 May 1982 to 16 May 1986. The federal executive council had 29 members. Milka Planinc was its president. Another 14 members represented the country's six republics (with two members each) and the two autonomous provinces (with one member each), serving as either vice-presidents or as members without portfolio. The remaining 14 members served as federal secretaries and chairmen.

Portfolio	Member	Took office	Left office	Party	Representing
President
President	Milka Planinc	16 May 1982	16 May 1986	SKJ	N/A (SR Croatia)
National Representatives
Vice-President	Zvone Dragan	16 May 1982	16 May 1984	SKJ	SR Slovenia
Vice-President	Janez Zemljarič	16 May 1984	16 May 1986	SKJ	SR Slovenia
Vice-President	Borislav Srebrić	16 May 1982	16 May 1986	SKJ	SR Serbia
Vice-President	Mijat Šuković	16 May 1982	16 May 1986	SKJ	SR Montenegro
Member	Boro Denkov	16 May 1982	16 May 1986	SKJ	SR Macedonia
Member	Živorad Kovačević	16 May 1982	16 May 1986	SKJ	SR Serbia
Member	Nedeljko Mandić	16 May 1982	16 May 1986	SKJ	SR Bosnia and Herzegovina
Member	Ivo Margan	16 May 1982	16 May 1984	SKJ	SR Croatia
Member	Ljubomir Baban	16 May 1984	16 May 1986	SKJ	SR Croatia
Member	Spasoje Medenica	16 May 1982	16 May 1986	SKJ	SR Montenegro
Member	Abdulah Mutapčić	16 May 1982	16 May 1984	SKJ	SR Bosnia and Herzegovina
Member	Ante Sučić	16 May 1984	16 May 1986	SKJ	SR Bosnia and Herzegovina
Member	Mito Pejovski	16 May 1982	16 May 1986	SKJ	SR Macedonia
Member	Janko Smole	16 May 1982	16 May 1984	SKJ	SR Slovenia
Member	Jan Jerne	16 May 1984	16 May 1986	SKJ	SR Slovenia
Member	Jon Srbovan	16 May 1982	16 May 1986	SKJ	SAP Vojvodina
Member	Rikard Štajner	16 May 1982	16 May 1986	SKJ	SR Croatia
Member	Dimitrije Tasić	16 May 1982	16 May 1986	SKJ	SAP Kosovo
State Secretaries
Foreign Affairs	Lazar Mojsov	16 May 1982	16 May 1984	SKJ	N/A (SR Macedonia)
Foreign Affairs	Raif Dizdarević	16 May 1984	16 May 1986	SKJ	N/A (SR Bosnia and Herzegovina)
National Defense	Branko Mamula	16 May 1982	16 May 1986	SKJ	N/A (SR Croatia)
Interior	Stane Dolanc	16 May 1982	16 May 1984	SKJ	N/A (SR Slovenia)
Interior	Dobroslav Ćulafić	16 May 1984	16 May 1986	SKJ	N/A (SR Montenegro)
Finance	Jože Florjančič	16 May 1982	13 December 1983	SKJ	N/A (SR Slovenia)
Finance	Vlado Klemenčič	13 December 1983	16 May 1986	SKJ	N/A (SR Slovenia)
Foreign Trade	Milenko Bojanić	16 May 1984	16 May 1986	SKJ	N/A (SR Serbia)
Market and Prices	Luka Reljić	16 May 1982	16 May 1984	SKJ	N/A (SR Bosnia and Herzegovina)
Market and Prices	Siniša Korica	16 May 1984	16 May 1986	SKJ	N/A (SAP Vojvodina)
Justice	Borislav Krajina	16 May 1982	16 May 1986	SKJ	N/A (SR Bosnia and Herzegovina)
Information	Mitko Čalovski	16 May 1982	17 July 1985	SKJ	N/A (SR Macedonia)
Information	Aleksandar Petković	17 July 1985	16 May 1986	SKJ	N/A (SR Serbia)
Chairs
Energy & Industry	Rade Pavlović	16 May 1982	16 May 1986	SKJ	N/A (SR Croatia)
Agriculture	Milorad Stanojević	16 May 1982	16 May 1986	SKJ	N/A (SR Montenegro)
Transport & Communications	Nazmi Mustafa	16 May 1982	16 May 1984	SKJ	N/A (SAP Kosovo)
Transport & Communications	Mustafa Pljakić	16 May 1984	16 May 1986	SKJ	N/A (SAP Kosovo)
Labour, Health & Social Protection	Đorđe Jakovljević	16 May 1982	16 May 1986	SKJ	N/A
Veterans & Disabled Persons	Dragomir Nikolić	16 May 1982	16 May 1984	SKJ	N/A
Veterans & Disabled Persons	Jovko Jovkovski	16 May 1984	16 May 1986	SKJ	N/A (SR Macedonia)
Legislation	Janko Česnik	16 May 1982	16 July 1983	SKJ	N/A (SR Slovenia)
Legislation	Petar Vajović	16 July 1983	16 May 1986	SKJ	N/A (SR Serbia)
