= Vice President of the Presidency of Yugoslavia =

The office of the vice president of the Presidency of the Socialist Federal Republic of Yugoslavia existed from the enactment of constitutional amendments establishing a collective presidency in 1971 until the dissolution of the country by 1992. The amendments established the roles of President and Vice President within the collective Presidency which would rotate between individual republics and autonomous provinces on an annual basis. However, it also defined a separate title of President of the Republic which could be conferred by the Federal Assembly into Josip Broz Tito who would automatically preside over the Presidency as well (and thus delay the implementation of the President of the Presidency role). Therefore, the launch of the Vice Presidency of the Presidency in 1971 would be the first to carry out a rotation system. Krste Crvenkovski of SR Macedonia was the first to hold the office. The subsequent order after SR Macedonia was SR Bosnia and Herzegovina, SR Slovenia, SR Serbia, SR Croatia, SR Montenegro, SAP Vojvodina, and SAP Kosovo. In 1974 a new Constitution was adopted which reaffirmed the collective federal presidency consisting of representatives of the six republics, the two autonomous provinces within Serbia and (until 1988) the President of the League of Communists.

The 1974 constitution affirmed Josip Broz Tito with an unlimited mandate which ensured the new office of President of the Presidency would not come into effect until after his death. The first President of the Presidency was to be the then standing Vice President of the Presidency. When Tito died on 4 May 1980, the then Vice President of the Presidency Lazar Koliševski acceded to the role of President of the Presidency.

== List ==
League of Communists of Yugoslavia Croatian Democratic Union Democratic Party of Socialists of Montenegro

| No. | Picture | Name (Born–Died) | Term of Office | | Political Party | Representing |
|---|---|---|---|---|---|---|
| 1 | | Krste Crvenkovski (1921–2001) | 29 July 1971 | 1 August 1972 | League of Communists of Yugoslavia | Macedonia |
| 2 | | Ratomir Dugonjić (1916–1987) | 1 August 1972 | June 1973 | League of Communists of Yugoslavia | Bosnia and Herzegovina |
| 3 | | Mitja Ribičič (1919–2013) | June 1973 | 16 May 1974 | League of Communists of Yugoslavia | Slovenia |
| 4 | | Petar Stambolić (1912–2007) | 16 May 1974 | 15 May 1975 | League of Communists of Yugoslavia | Serbia |
| 5 | | Vladimir Bakarić (1912–1983) | 15 May 1975 | 15 May 1976 | League of Communists of Yugoslavia | Croatia |
| 6 | | Vidoje Žarković (1927–2000) | 15 May 1976 | 15 May 1977 | League of Communists of Yugoslavia | Montenegro |
| 7 | | Stevan Doronjski (1919–1981) | 15 May 1977 | 15 May 1978 | League of Communists of Yugoslavia | SAP Vojvodina |
| 8 | | Fadil Hoxha (1916–2001) | 15 May 1978 | 15 May 1979 | League of Communists of Yugoslavia | SAP Kosovo |
| 9 | | Lazar Koliševski (1914–2000) | 15 May 1979 | 4 May 1980 | League of Communists of Yugoslavia | Macedonia |
| 10 | | Cvijetin Mijatović (1913–1992) | 4 May 1980 | 15 May 1980 | League of Communists of Yugoslavia | Bosnia and Herzegovina |
| 11 | | Sergej Kraigher (1914–2001) | 15 May 1980 | 15 May 1981 | League of Communists of Yugoslavia | Slovenia |
| (4) | | Petar Stambolić (1912–2007) | 15 May 1981 | 15 May 1982 | League of Communists of Yugoslavia | Serbia |
| (5) | | Vladimir Bakarić (1912–1983) | 15 May 1982 | 16 January 1983 | League of Communists of Yugoslavia | Croatia |
| 12 | | Mika Špiljak (1916–2007) | January 1983 | 15 May 1983 | League of Communists of Yugoslavia | Croatia |
| (6) | | Vidoje Žarković (1927–2000) | 15 May 1983 | 15 May 1984 | League of Communists of Yugoslavia | Montenegro |
| 13 | | Radovan Vlajković (1922–2001) | 15 May 1984 | 15 May 1985 | League of Communists of Yugoslavia | SAP Vojvodina |
| 14 | | Sinan Hasani (1922–2010) | 15 May 1985 | 15 May 1986 | League of Communists of Yugoslavia | SAP Kosovo |
| 15 | | Lazar Mojsov (1920–2011) | 15 May 1986 | 15 May 1987 | League of Communists of Yugoslavia | Macedonia |
| 16 | | Hamdija Pozderac (1924–1988) | 15 May 1987 | September 1987 | League of Communists of Yugoslavia | Bosnia and Herzegovina |
| 17 | | Raif Dizdarević (1926–2026) | September 1987 | 15 May 1988 | League of Communists of Yugoslavia | Bosnia and Herzegovina |
| 18 | | Stane Dolanc (1925–1999) | 15 May 1988 | 15 May 1989 | League of Communists of Yugoslavia | Slovenia |
| 19 | | Borisav Jović (1928–2021) | 15 May 1989 | 15 May 1990 | League of Communists of Yugoslavia | Serbia |
| 20 | | Stipe Šuvar (1936–2004) | 15 May 1990 | August 1990 | League of Communists of Yugoslavia | Croatia |
| 21 | | Stjepan Mesić (1934– ) | August 1990 | 15 May 1991 | Croatian Democratic Union | Croatia |
| 22 | | Branko Kostić (1939–2020) | 15 May 1991 | December 1991 | Democratic Party of Socialists of Montenegro | Montenegro |

== See also ==
- Vice President of Yugoslavia
- Head of state of Yugoslavia
  - President of Yugoslavia
  - President of the Presidency of Yugoslavia
- Presidency of Yugoslavia
