= Aleksandar Mitrović (politician) =

Yugoslav politician

- Александар Митровић

Acting President of the Federal Executive Council
- In office 20 December 1991 – 14 July 1992
- President: Branko Kostić (Acting)
- Preceded by: Ante Marković
- Succeeded by: Position abolished

Personal details
- Born: 4 August 1933 Osladić, Yugoslavia (now Serbia)
- Died: 19 September 2012 (aged 79) Belgrade, Serbia
- Party: Socialist Party of Serbia (SPS)

Aleksandar Mitrović (Serbian Cyrillic: Александар Митровић; 4 August 1933 – 19 September 2012) was a Serbian politician who was Deputy Prime Minister and then Acting Prime Minister of Yugoslavia.
