= Old Cooperative House of the Ranković Family =

Old Cooperative House of Ranković Family
- Стара задружна кућа Ранковића
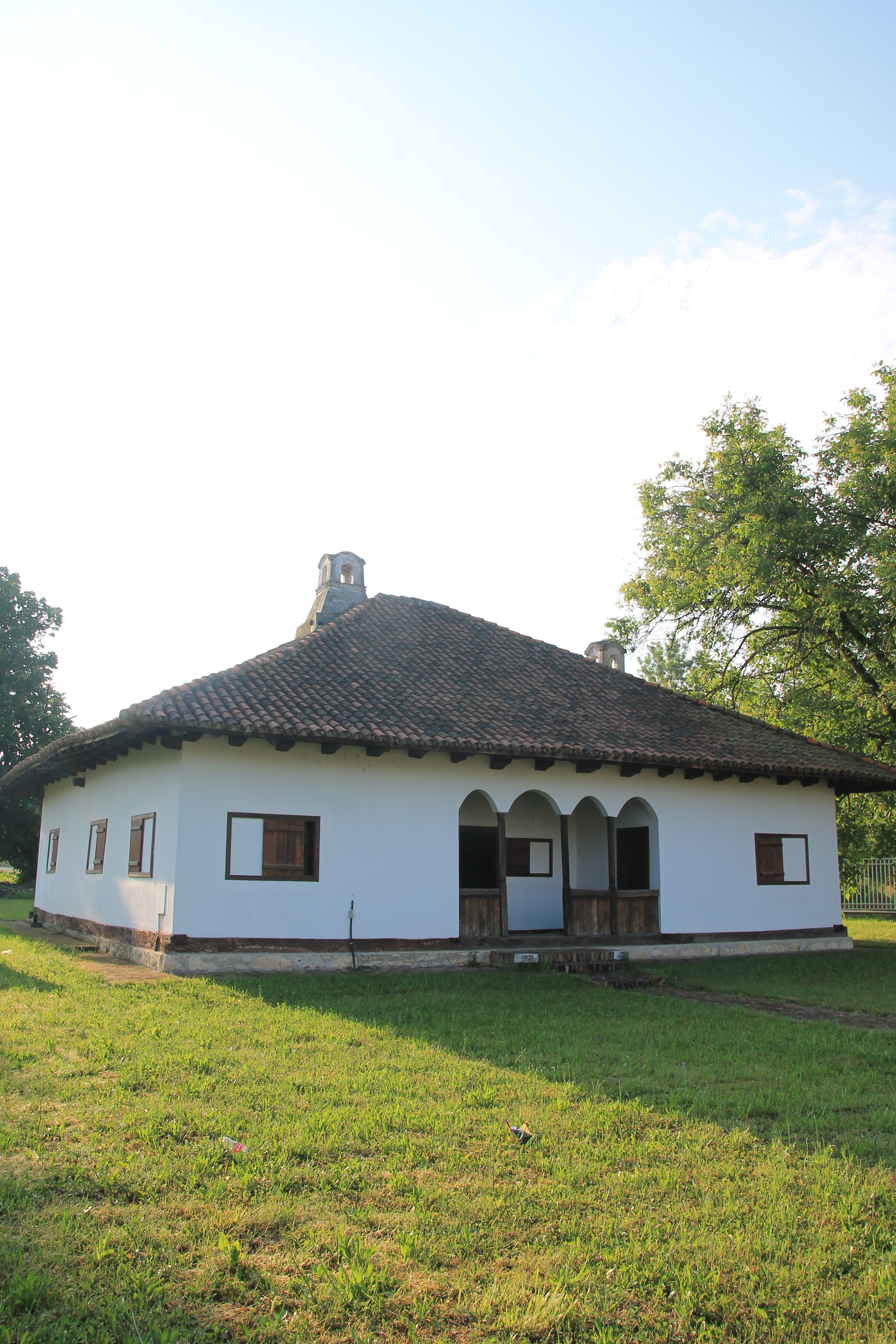
- Old Cooperative House of Ranković Family
- Interactive map of the Old Cooperative House of Ranković Family area

General information
- Type: Cultural monument
- Location: Draževac, Serbia
- Coordinates: 44.5875°N 20.2228°E
- Construction started: first half of 19th century

Old Cooperative House of Ranković Family is located in Draževac, a settlement in the territory of the city municipality of Obrenovac. The building is listed as a cultural monument.

== Description ==
Old Cooperative House of Ranković Family in Draževac is typical of houses built in Šumadija and central Serbia. It is a rural cooperative house built by a wealthy family in the first half of the 19th century.

== Description ==
The house has a square foundation of 15 x 15 m, built using oak beams placed upon a stone base. The walls are brick and rubble construction and the roof is tiled. The front porch is deep with a four-arch arcade, and is protected by a wooden half-wall added later. Inside, four rooms are arranged around a central hall. The windows are aligned in a marked horizontal pattern. The large roof eaves are artistically designed.

The house was moved to its present location near the primary school in Draževac in the 1980s.
