= Vice President of Yugoslavia =

The office of vice president of the Socialist Federal Republic of Yugoslavia existed from April 1963 to June 1967. It was established by the new Yugoslav Constitution adopted on 7 April 1963. The first to serve in the role was Aleksandar Ranković who assumed office on 30 June 1963. Due to an affair involving wire-tapping of Yugoslav president and general secretary of the League of Communists Josip Broz Tito, Ranković was forced to resign from the Central Committee and from the vice presidency on 1 July 1966. He was subsequently replaced by Koča Popović two weeks later who served out the remainder of Ranković's four-year term. On 26 April 1967 new amendments to the 1963 constitution were approved which disestablished the vice presidency once Ranković and Popović's combined four-year term was up. The office ceased to exist on 30 June 1967.

== List of vice presidents ==
No.	Picture	Name (Born–Died)	Term of Office		Political Party	Representing
1		Aleksandar Ranković (1909–1983)	30 June 1963	1 July 1966	League of Communists of Yugoslavia	SR Serbia
2		Koča Popović (1908–1992)	14 July 1966	30 June 1967	League of Communists of Yugoslavia	SR Serbia

== See also ==
- Vice President of the Presidency of Yugoslavia
- List of heads of state of Yugoslavia
  - President of Yugoslavia
