= Branko Kostić =

Montenegrin politician

- Бранко Костић
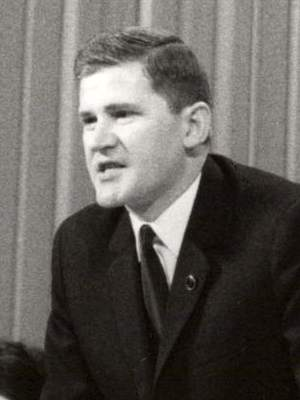
- Kostić in 1968

Acting President of the Presidency of Yugoslavia
- In office 6 December 1991 – 15 June 1992
- Prime Minister: Ante Marković; Aleksandar Mitrović (acting)
- Preceded by: Stipe Mesić
- Succeeded by: Office dissolved

Secretary-General of the Non-Aligned Movement
- In office 6 December 1991 – 15 June 1992
- Preceded by: Stipe Mesić
- Succeeded by: Dobrica Ćosić

Personal details
- Born: 28 August 1939 Rvaši, Cetinje, Yugoslavia
- Died: 20 August 2020 (aged 80) Podgorica, Montenegro
- Party: SKJ (until 1990); DPS (1990–1992)

Branko Kostić (Serbian Cyrillic: Бранко Костић, 28 August 1939 – 20 August 2020) was a Yugoslav politician, businessman, and university professor.

== Biography ==
He graduated from the University of Belgrade Faculty of Economics in 1962, received his master's degree in 1977, doctorate in 1980; all at the Faculty of Economics in Belgrade. He held numerous responsible political functions during the Socialist Federal Republic of Yugoslavia (SFRY):

- Chairman of the Central Committee of the Youth Federation of Montenegro (1963–1968)
- Deputy Prime Minister of Montenegro (1986–1989)
- President of the Presidency of Montenegro (1989–1991)
- Delegate to the Assembly of Yugoslavia and Chairman of the Delegation of Montenegro to the Council of Republics and Provinces (1991)
- Vice President of the Presidency of Yugoslavia and later acting President of the Presidency of Yugoslavia (from mid-May 1991 to the middle of June 1992, when this post was abolished).

As president of the Presidency of Montenegro, he was chairman of the committee for the transfer of the remains of King Nicholas I of Montenegro and members of the royal family from Sanremo, Italy to Cetinje, Montenegro.

In the 1970s, he built a career in industry and his name is associated with the most successful years of growth and development of what was then the largest company in Montenegro. He was an advisor and then a commercial (1969–1974) and general manager of the Aluminum Combine in Titograd (1974–1978).

After leaving the Aluminum Combine, he continued his career at the University of Montenegro. He was a scientific advisor at the Institute for Technical Research, one of the founders of the Faculty of Civil Engineering and a full professor of economics at all technical faculties, until retiring in 2003. A full overview of published works was given in his bio-bibliography in the Memorial of the Faculty of Civil Engineering (Memorial, 2000).

He spoke Russian and French, and used English.

He was the bearer of the Order of Labour with a Golden Wreath and of the Memorial for his contribution to the preservation of Yugoslav statehood and the affirmation of ethnic and self-determined Yugoslavs.

== Published books ==
- "Aluminium and Technical Progress", Institute za technical istraživanja – Tehnički fakulteti, Titograd, 1981.
- "1991 – Not to be forgotten", Filip Višnjić, Beograd and Obodsko slovo, Rijeka Crnajevića, 1996
- "Records", Vaša Knjiga, Beograd and Pegaz, Bijelo Polje, 2005
- "The truth about the breaking up of Yugoslavia - My testimony in the Hague", Pegaz, Bijelo Polje, 2010
- "Fishing of Ceklin", Pegaz, Bijelo Polje, 2011
- "Kostići: Fraternity in Ceklin, Old Montenegro; genealogy (from about 1490 to 2013)", Pegaz, Bijelo Polje, 2014
- "I didn't step down the oath: interviews, speeches, statements, Books 1 & 2", Pegaz, Bijelo Polje, 2015

== Positions held ==
Political offices
Preceded by Stjepan Mesić	President of the Presidency of Yugoslavia (acting); 6 December 1991 – 15 June 1992	Succeeded by post abolished
Preceded by Slobodan Simović (acting)	President of the Presidency of Montenegro; 17 March 1989 – 23 December 1990	Succeeded by Momir Bulatović as President of Montenegro
Diplomatic posts
Preceded by Stjepan Mesić	Secretary General of the Non-Aligned Movement; 1991–1992	Succeeded by Dobrica Ćosić
