= Veronika Bakotić =

Yugoslav linguist, literary translator, propaganda press officer in World War II

Veronika Vjera Bakotić
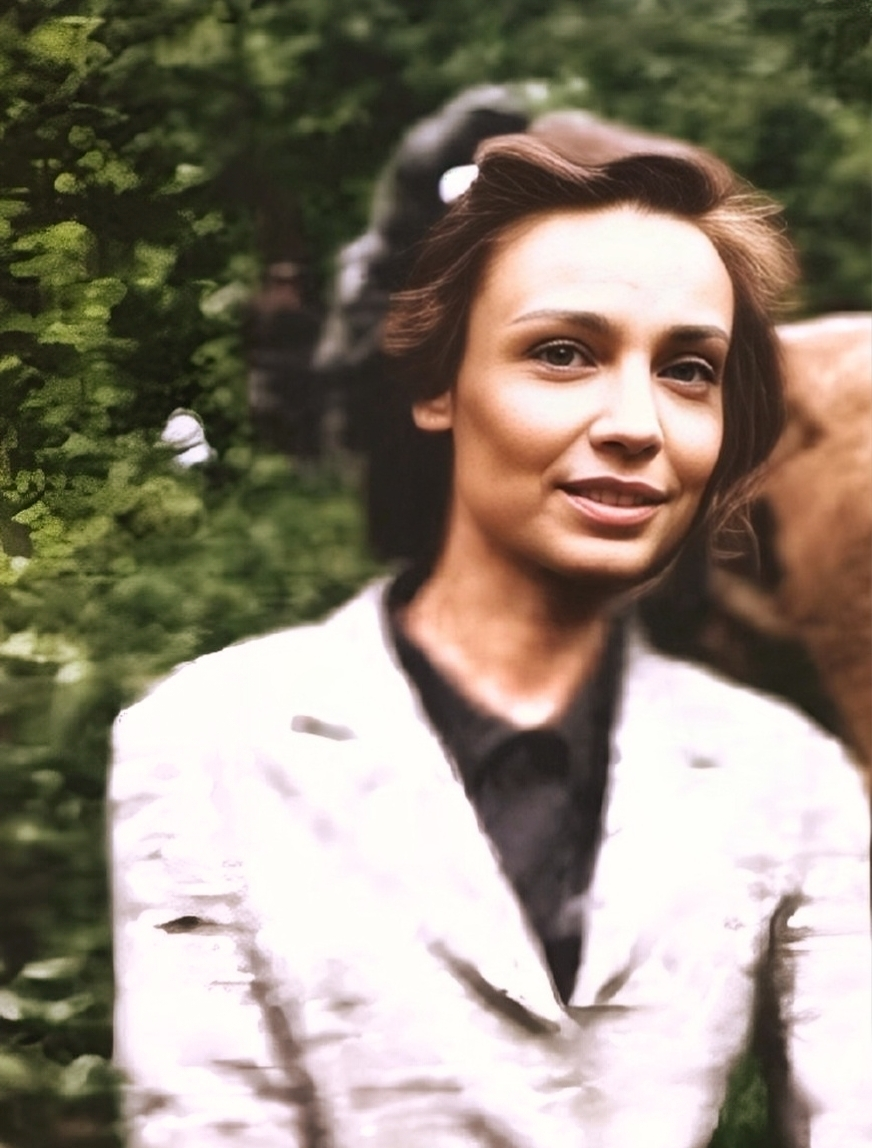
- Born: 19 March 1912; Šibenik, Austria-Hungary
- Died: 9 July 2005 (aged 93); Belgrade, Serbia and Montenegro
- Education: Faculty of Philosophy, University of Belgrade
- Occupations: Yugoslav linguist, literary translator, propaganda press officer in World War II
- Spouse: Konstantin Koča Popović

Veronika "Vjera" (Vera) Bakotić-Mijušković (Šibenik, 19 March 1912 – Belgrade, 9 July 2005) was a Yugoslav partisan, linguist, translator from Italian and French to Serbo-Croatian, and the first wife of Konstantin Koča Popović.

== Biography ==
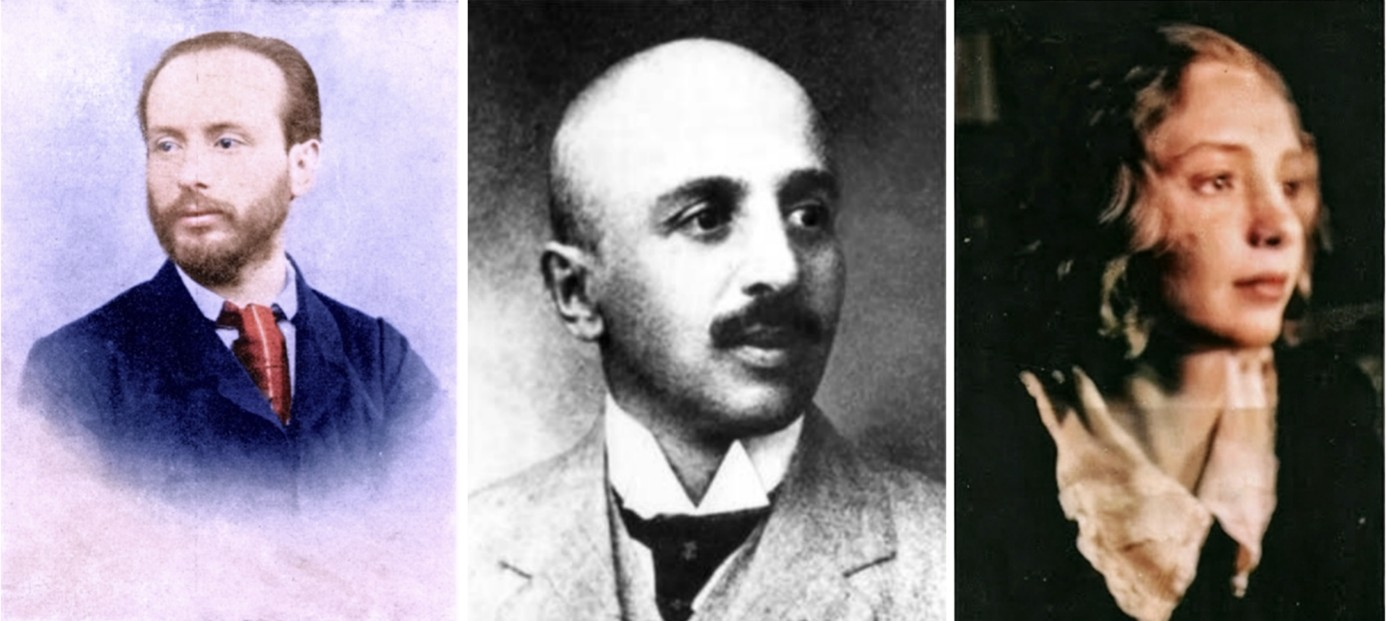
Three generations of Kastelan-Belgrade Bakotić: grandfather Ignatija; son Lujo (Alojzije); granddaughter Veronika Vjera Bakotić Mijušković

She was born in Šibenik, Croatia, to a Serbo-Catholic family from Kaštel Gomilica, Vjera came from an educated background—her grandfather and father were both lawyers with doctorates from Vienna and Graz. Her father, Lujo Bakotić, served as a diplomat for the Kingdom of Serbia. After her mother's death when Vjera was two, she and her sisters were raised by their grandmother, Italian Marquise Adele Gravizi di Pjetra Peroza Bakotić, in Split, and later sent to a Swiss boarding school.

Vjera attended elementary and high school in Rome where her father worked as a minister to the Vatican and later studied at the Faculty of Philosophy in Belgrade, graduating in 1938 with a degree in Romance Studies. During her university years, she was actively involved in the progressive student movement, serving as president of the Association of Students of French Language and Literature and contributing to publications like "Žena danas" and "Naša stvarnost".

== World War II ==
During World War II, Vjera hid in Belgrade as an illegal. At the beginning of 1942, she was arrested by the Special Police as a hostage. Only in the spring of 1944 did she manage to connect with the movement and join the partisans. She was immediately assigned to the position of head of the Press Propaganda Department of the Second Proletarian Division and was included in the work of the Party. After demobilization, in 1946, she was sent to work in Tanjug, and then to the Central Committee of the Anti-Fascist Women's Front of Yugoslavia, in the Department for Foreign Relations.

== Professional life ==
At her own request, in September 1948, she transferred to the Faculty of Philosophy (now Philology) of the University of Belgrade, where she taught The Theory of Literature for the first two years at the Department of Serbo-Croatian Language and Literature. From 1950, she worked at the Department of Italian Studies, first as a lecturer and then, until her retirement, as a senior professional associate.

She translated a number of works from the fields of fiction, essays, philosophy and dramatic literature from Italian and French (Leonardo da Vinci, Giordano Bruno, Girolamo Savonarola, Alberto Fortis, Niccolò Machiavelli, Angelo Beolco Rucante, Carlo Goldoni, Luigi Pirandello, Francesco de Sanctis, Edmondo de Amicis, Lionelo Venturi, Alberto Moravia, Stendhal, Balzac, Henri Lefebvre, Giraud, etc.). Vjera was the author of many forewords, reviews, articles and essays in the field of Italian literature and culture. She also dealt with theater criticism. She won a prize at the Literary Test Competition for Italianists from abroad in Perugia in 1956. The Serbian National Theater in Novi Sad performed in her translation "Rucante's story after returning from the battlefield" and "The fly".

== Personal life ==
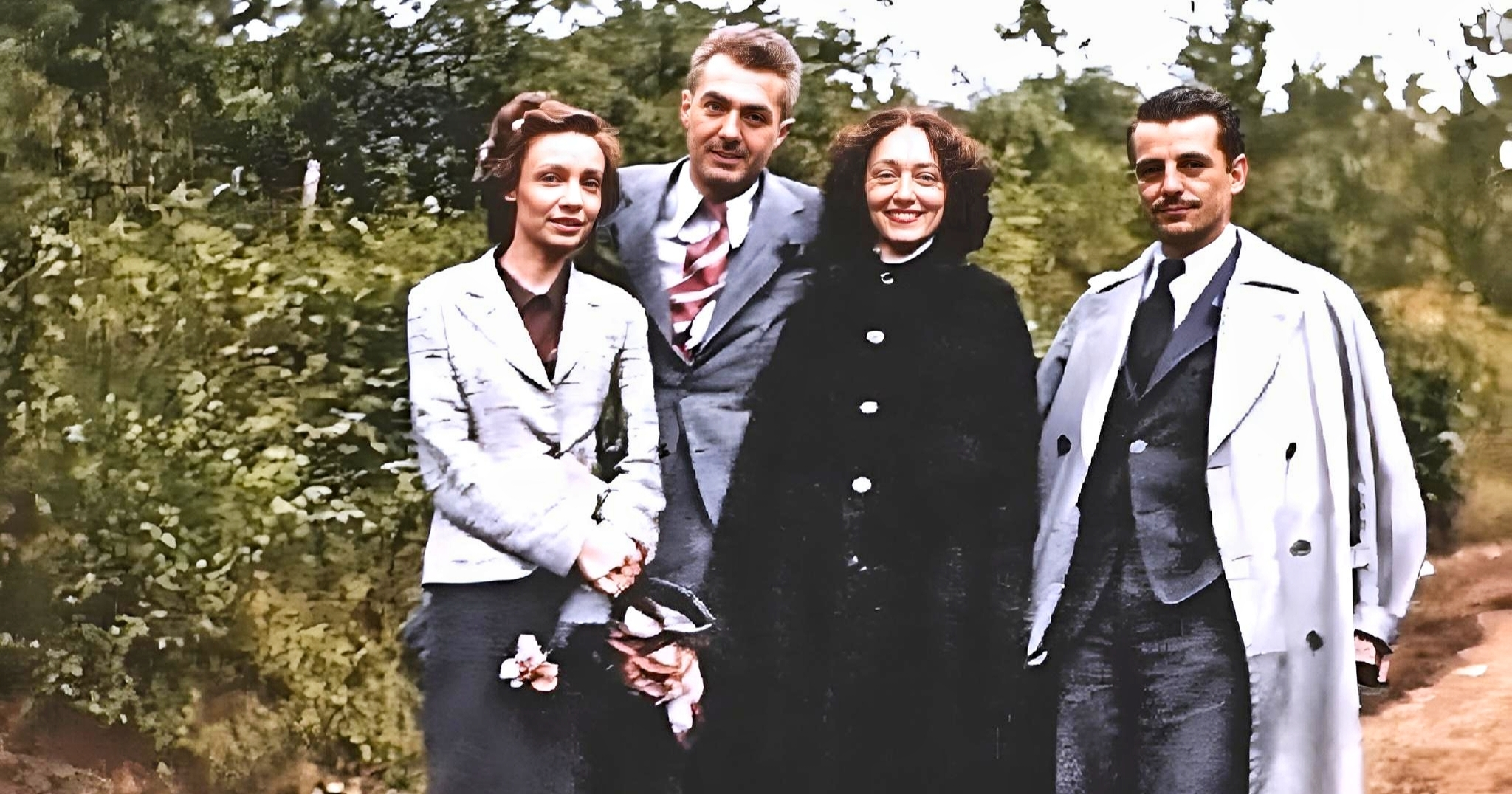
From left to right: Vjera Bakotić, Paul Eluard with his wife and Koča Popović. Paris, 1939.

Vjera Bakotić met her first husband, Konstantin "Koča" Popović, in 1930, and they got married in July 1933 in Novi Sad. The couple shared a connection through the surrealist movement, with Vjera being featured in works by surrealist artist Vane Bor in 1931.

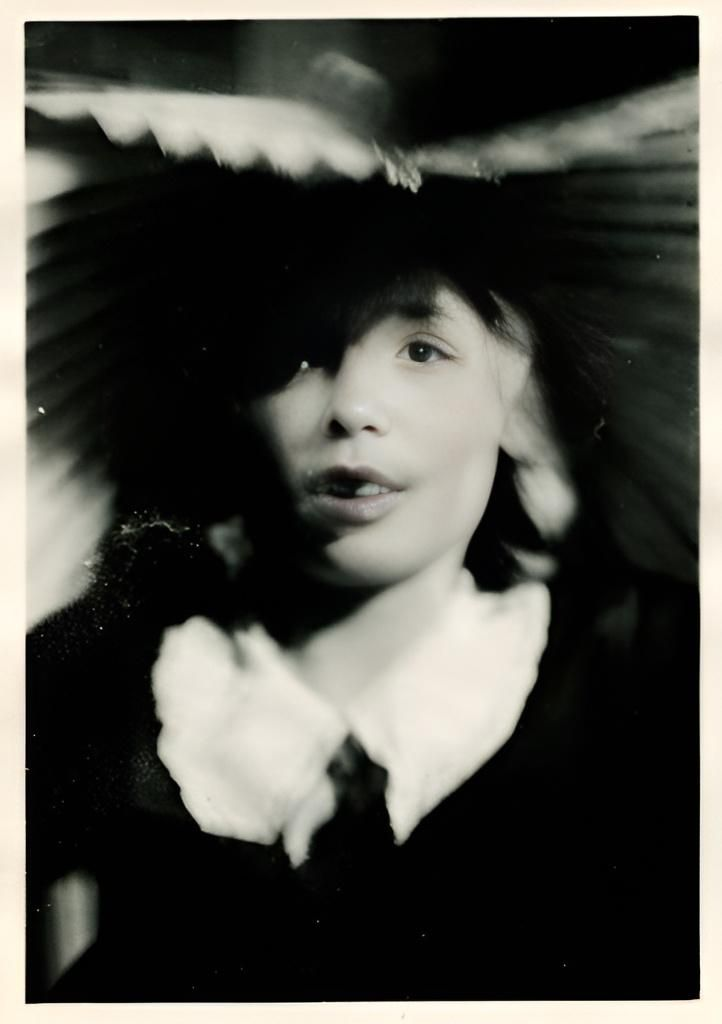
Author: Stevan Živadinović (Vane Bor), 1931.

After the war, Koča Popović divorced her, on the orders of the party. The same year, Vjera accepted the marriage proposal of her colleague from Tanjug, Marko Mijušković, with whom she remained until his death in 1989.

In 1988, on his 80th birthday, Koča Popović published the book "Notes on War" which contains, in addition to war events, "thoughts dedicated to one great love of the author". The legacy of Konstantin-Koča Popović and Leposava Perović contains the carefully preserved correspondence of Vera's and Koča's love letters.

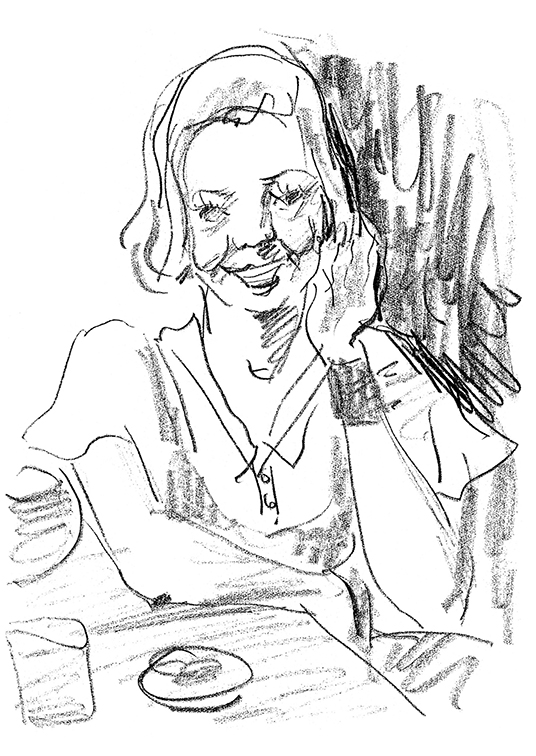
Vjera Bakotić, pencil drawing on paper; author Koča Popović, 1931.

== Literature ==
- Encyclopedia of Yugoslavia (book one). "Yugoslavian Lexicographic Institute", Zagreb, 1955.
- "Yugoslav contemporaries: Who's who in Yugoslavia". "Chronometar", Belgrade, 1970.
- "Women of Serbia in NOB". "Nolit", Belgrade, 1975.
- Jovanka Kecman "Women of Yugoslavia in the labor movement and women's organizations 1918-1941". "Institute for Contemporary History" Belgrade and "Narodna knjiga" Belgrade, 1978.
- Čkrebić, Dušan (2012). Koča Popović - A Deep Human Secret. Belgrade: Official Gazette. ISBN 978-86-519-1616-1.
- Popović, Konstantin (1988). Белешке уз ратовање (дневник, белешке, документи) [Notes on the War (diary, notes, documents)] (in Serbian). Belgrade: BIGZ. ISBN 86-13-00290-0. COBISS.SR 87976455.
