= Deputy Prime Minister of Yugoslavia =

Deputy Prime Minister Podpredsjednik Vlade Потпредседник Владе
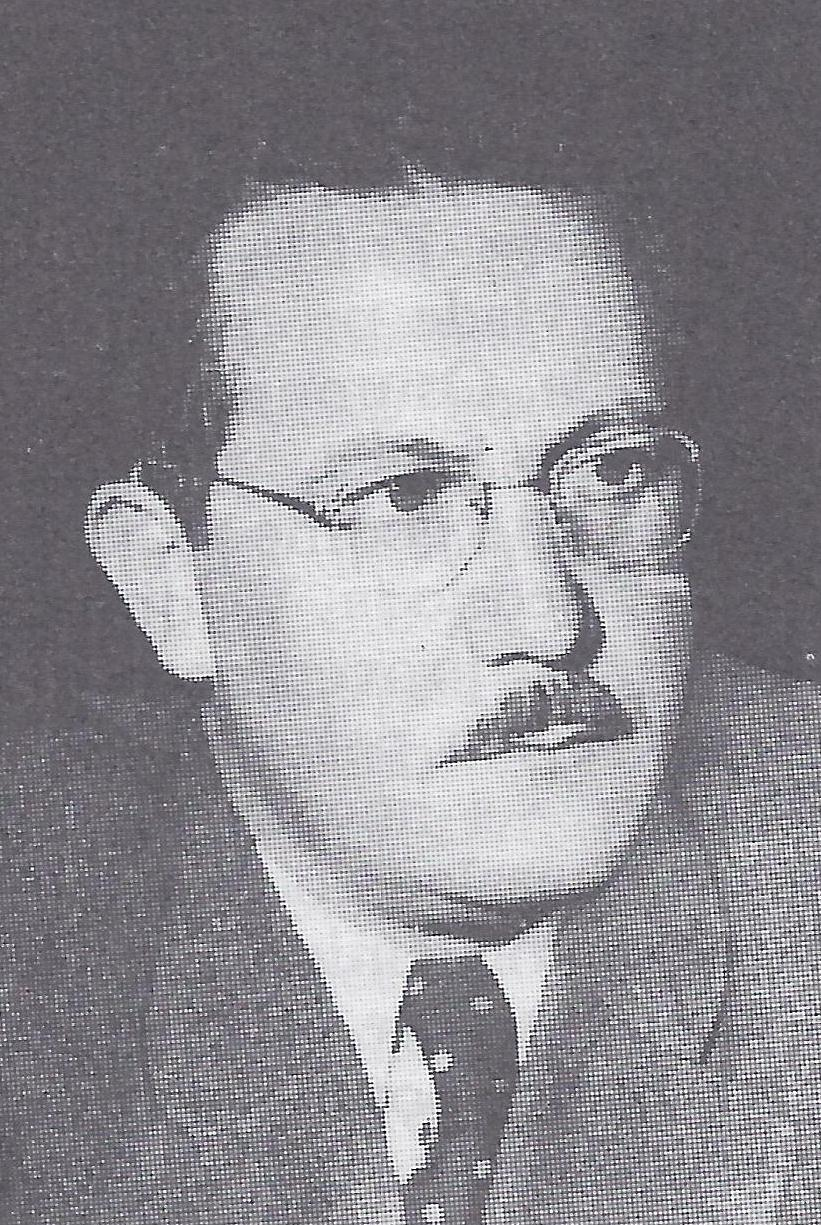
- Longest serving Edvard Kardelj; 7 March 1945 – 29 June 1963
- Formation: 26 August 1939
- First holder: Vladko Maček
- Final holder: Aleksandar Mitrović; Živko Pregl
- Abolished: 21 November 1991

The Deputy Prime Minister was a political function that existed in the Kingdom of Yugoslavia (1939 up to WWII) and the Socialist Federal Republic of Yugoslavia (between WWII and the breakup of Yugoslavia).

== History of the office ==
The office of the Deputy Prime Minister of the Kingdom of Yugoslavia was established on 26 August 1939, during the government of Dragiša Cvetković. It was initially held by Vladko Maček.

The office of the Deputy Prime Minister of SFR Yugoslavia was established on 2 February 1946, during the government of Josip Broz Tito. It was initially held by two people: Edvard Kardelj and Jaša Prodanović. From then on, the office was usually held simultaneously by several people at the same time. Also, Deputy Prime Ministers sometimes combined the post with another government portfolio.

== List of deputy prime ministers ==
=== Kingdom of Yugoslavia period (1939–1945) ===
Portrait	Name (Birth–Death)	Term of office		Political party
	Vladko Maček (1879–1964)	26 August 1939	10 April 1941	Croatian Peasant Party
	Slobodan Jovanović (1869–1958)	10 April 1941	14 April 1941	Independent
Yugoslav government-in-exile				
	Slobodan Jovanović (1869–1958)	14 April 1941	11 January 1942	Independent
	Juraj Krnjević (1895–1988)	21 August 1941	10 August 1943	Croatian Peasant Party
	Miha Krek (1897–1969)	21 August 1941	10 August 1943	Slovene People's Party
	Slobodan Jovanović (1869–1958)	26 June 1943	10 August 1943	Independent
Provisional Government				
	Milan Grol (1876–1952)	7 March 1945	18 August 1945	Democratic Party
	Edvard Kardelj (1910–1979)	7 March 1945	1 February 1946	Communist Party

=== SFR Yugoslavia period (1945–1992) ===
Portrait	Name (Birth–Death)	Term of office		Political party	Ref.
	Edvard Kardelj (1910–1979)	2 February 1946	29 June 1963	Communist Party renamed in 1952 to League of Communists	
	Jaša Prodanović (1867–1948)	2 February 1946	1 June 1948	Communist Party	
	Aleksandar Ranković (1909–1983)	1 April 1949	18 April 1963	Communist Party renamed in 1952 to League of Communists	
	Blagoje Nešković (1907–1984)	5 September 1949	14 January 1953	Communist Party renamed in 1952 to League of Communists	
	Milovan Đilas (1911–1995)	14 January 1953	17 January 1954	League of Communists	
	Moša Pijade (1890–1957)	14 January 1953	30 January 1954	League of Communists	
	Svetozar Vukmanović (1912–2000)	30 January 1954	19 April 1958	League of Communists	
	Rodoljub Čolaković (1900–1983)	30 January 1954	29 June 1963	League of Communists	
	Mijalko Todorović (1913–1999)	19 April 1958	29 June 1963	League of Communists	
	Svetislav Stefanović (1910–1980)	18 April 1963	29 June 1963	League of Communists	
	Boris Kraigher (1914–1967)	29 June 1963	4 January 1967	League of Communists	
	Miloš Minić (1914–2003)	29 June 1963	18 May 1967	League of Communists	
	Veljko Zeković (1906–1985)	29 June 1963	18 May 1967	League of Communists	
	Kiro Gligorov (1917–2012)	18 May 1967	18 May 1969	League of Communists	
	Rudi Kolak (1918–2004)	18 May 1967	18 May 1969	League of Communists	
	Nikola Miljanić (1921–1972)	18 May 1969	30 July 1971	League of Communists	
	Mišo Pavićević (1915–1995)	18 May 1969	30 July 1971	League of Communists	
	Aleksandar Grličkov (1923–1989)	18 May 1969	30 July 1971	League of Communists	
	Jakov Sirotković (1922–2002)	30 July 1971	17 May 1974	League of Communists	
	Anton Vratuša (1915–2017)	3 December 1971	16 May 1978	League of Communists	
	Dobroslav Ćulafić (1926–2011)	17 May 1974	16 May 1978	League of Communists	
	Berislav Šefer (born 1926)	17 May 1974	16 May 1978	League of Communists	
	Miloš Minić (1914–2003)	17 May 1974	16 May 1978	League of Communists	
	Branislav Ikonić (1928–2002)	16 May 1978	16 May 1982	League of Communists	
	Ivo Margan (1926–2010)	16 May 1978	16 May 1982	League of Communists	
	Andrej Marinc (1930–2025)	16 May 1978	16 May 1982	League of Communists	
	Dragoljub Stavrev (1932–2003)	16 May 1978	16 May 1982	League of Communists	
	Gojko Ubiparip (1927–2000)	16 May 1978	16 May 1982	League of Communists	
	Zvone Dragan (born 1939)	16 May 1982	15 May 1984	League of Communists	
	Borislav Srebrić (1927–1997)	16 May 1982	15 June 1986	League of Communists	
	Mijat Šuković (1930–2011)	16 May 1982	15 June 1986	League of Communists	
	Janez Zemljarič (1928–2022)	15 May 1982	16 March 1989	League of Communists	
	Miloš Milosavljević (born 1932)	16 May 1986	16 March 1989	League of Communists	
	Aleksandar Mitrović (1933–2012)	16 March 1989	20 December 1991	League of Communists	
	Živko Pregl (1947–2011)	16 March 1989	21 November 1991	League of Communists	

== See also ==
- Prime Minister of Yugoslavia
- Deputy Prime Minister of the Federal Republic of Yugoslavia
