= Koča Popović =

Yugoslav general and politician (1908–1992)

- Коча Поповић
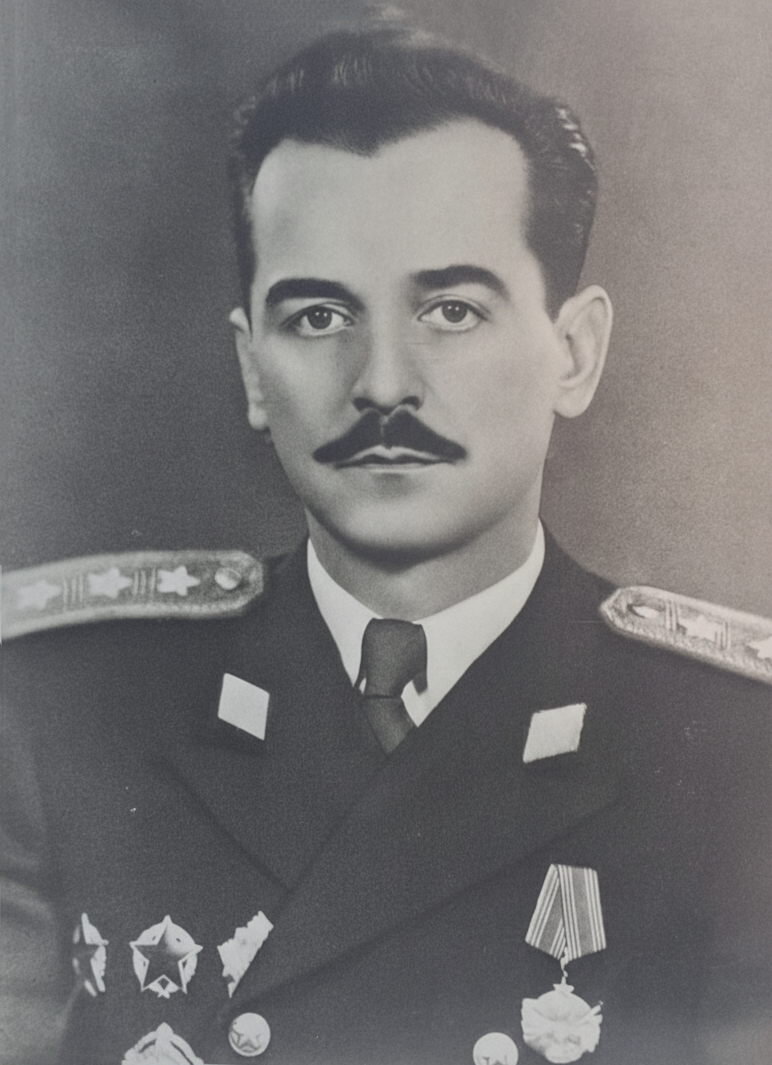
- Popović in 1948

2nd Vice President of Yugoslavia
- In office 14 July 1966 – 30 June 1967
- President: Josip Broz Tito
- Preceded by: Aleksandar Ranković
- Succeeded by: Office dissolved

Minister of Foreign Affairs
- In office 15 January 1953 – 23 April 1965
- Prime Minister: Josip Broz Tito; Petar Stambolić
- Preceded by: Edvard Kardelj
- Succeeded by: Marko Nikezić

Personal details
- Born: Konstantin Popović; 14 March 1908 Belgrade, Kingdom of Serbia
- Died: 20 October 1992 (aged 84) Belgrade, Serbia, FR Yugoslavia
- Party: League of Communists of Yugoslavia
- Spouse: Veronika Vjera Bakotić (1933–1946; divorced)
- Domestic partner: Leposava Lepa Perović (1946–1992; his death)
- Education: University of Paris
- Profession: Writer; Soldier
- Awards: 31 international and 15 Yugoslav decorations, including Order of Freedom; Legion of Honour; Order of George I Order of Merit of Italy; Order of St. Olav
- Nickname: Grof

Military service
- Allegiance: Kingdom of Yugoslavia; Spanish Republic; Yugoslavia
- Branch/service: Royal Yugoslav Army; International Brigades; Yugoslav Partisans; Yugoslav People's Army; Yugoslav Ground Forces
- Years of service: 1926–1927; 1937–1939; 1941–1953
- Rank: Colonel General
- Commands: First Proletarian Brigade; 1st Division; 1st Corps; 2nd Army; Chief of the General Staff
- Battles/wars: Spanish Civil War, World War II

Konstantin "Koča" Popović (Serbian Cyrillic: Константин "Коча" Поповић; 14 March 1908 – 20 October 1992) was a Serbian and Yugoslav politician and communist volunteer in the Spanish Civil War, 1937–1939 and Divisional Commander of the First Proletarian Division of the Yugoslav Partisans. He is on occasion referred to as "the man who saved the Yugoslav Partisans", because it was he who anticipated the weakest point in the Axis lines on the Zelengora–Kalinovik axis, and devised the plan for breaking through it during the Battle of Sutjeska, thus saving Josip Broz Tito, his headquarters and the rest of the resistance movement. After the war, he served as the Chief of the General Staff of the Yugoslav People's Army, before moving to the position of Minister of Foreign Affairs and spent the final years of his political career as Vice President of Yugoslavia.

Despite being a member of the Communist Party of Yugoslavia, Popović was a supporter of free-market reforms and was also a member of a group of Serbian liberals, a prominent political movement in the 1970s, which also included Marko Nikezić and Latinka Perović. He retired in 1972, amidst pressure against his group of liberals. He spent the rest of his life in Dubrovnik and was very outspoken against the Yugoslav Wars and the regimes of Franjo Tuđman and Slobodan Milošević.

In his youth, Popović was one of the founding members of the Serbian Surrealist movement. He co-wrote a book with Marko Ristić. Also, Popović was among the founders of the Yugoslav Sports Association Partizan and FK Partizan, the football section of the Yugoslav Sports Association Partizan.

== Biography ==
Popović came from a prosperous Belgrade family and spent the First World War in Switzerland. He was also one of the thirteen signatories of the Serbian Surrealist manifesto in 1930.

In 1929, Popović moved to Paris to study Law and Philosophy. Here he mixed with the Left Bank world of poets, writers, artists and intellectuals. He became an active Surrealist, active in both the French and Serbian Surrealist groups. In 1931 Nacrt za jednu fenomenologiju iracionalnog (Outline for a Phenomenology of the Irrational) was published which he had co-written with Marko Ristić.

Popović then became involved with the then illegal Yugoslav Communist Party. In Paris there was a center run by Comintern and headed by Josip Broz Tito, which was used to feed volunteers from the Balkans to the Republicans in the Spanish Civil War. Popović was drafted through this center along with a select group of Party members. Popović fought with Spanish Republican forces and not the International Brigades, holding the rank of artillery captain. At the close of the Spanish Civil War Popović escaped through France and made his way back to Yugoslavia.

=== World War II ===
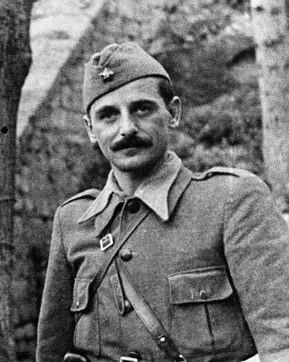
Popović as commander of the First Proletarian Division in Drvar, 1943

In 1940, as a reserve officer in the Royal Yugoslav Army, Popović was mobilized and told by his Colonel to watch out for subversive activities within the regiment.

After the surrender of the Royal Yugoslav Army to the German Army in April 1941, Popović organized the Kosmaj detachment during the uprising in Serbia. On the formation of the First Proletarian Brigade, Popović became its commander, and subsequently commanded the First Proletarian Division.

During his time leading the Partisans he encountered William Deakin, leader of the British military mission to Tito's headquarters, who wrote of Popović:

At the head of the First Proletarian Division was General Koča Popović. He had been present at our first encounter with Tito and his Staff on the morning of our arrival, but his identity was not disclosed. Taut and deliberately controlled by a sensitive and disciplined mind and power of will, Popovic was an intellectual soldier of outstanding talents, which were perhaps alien to his inner nature. [...] He was bilingual in caustic polished French, and his mental defences were impenetrable. His sarcasm was rapier-like, respectful of counter-thrusts, but he was never off his guard. [...] Popovic was a lone wolf and a solitary man, with rare unguarded moments. He had a touch of military genius and hatred of war. He was wary of friendship and defended with a devilish skill total integrity of mind and heart. [...] I was frequently in his company and grew to accept his contrived and polished sallies. Daring with cold deliberation and secret by nature, he was the idol of his troops, but few men knew him.

== Post-war ==
Alongside dozens of other WW2 and Spanish Civil War veterans, Popović was among the founding fathers of the Partizan Belgrade football club in October 1945.

After the establishment of a communist regime in Yugoslavia in 1945, he served as the Chief of the Yugoslavian General Staff from 1945 until 1953. In this function he also conducted negotiations with the representatives of Western powers associated with the modernisation of the JNA during the conflict with the Soviet Union (i.e., Informbiro).

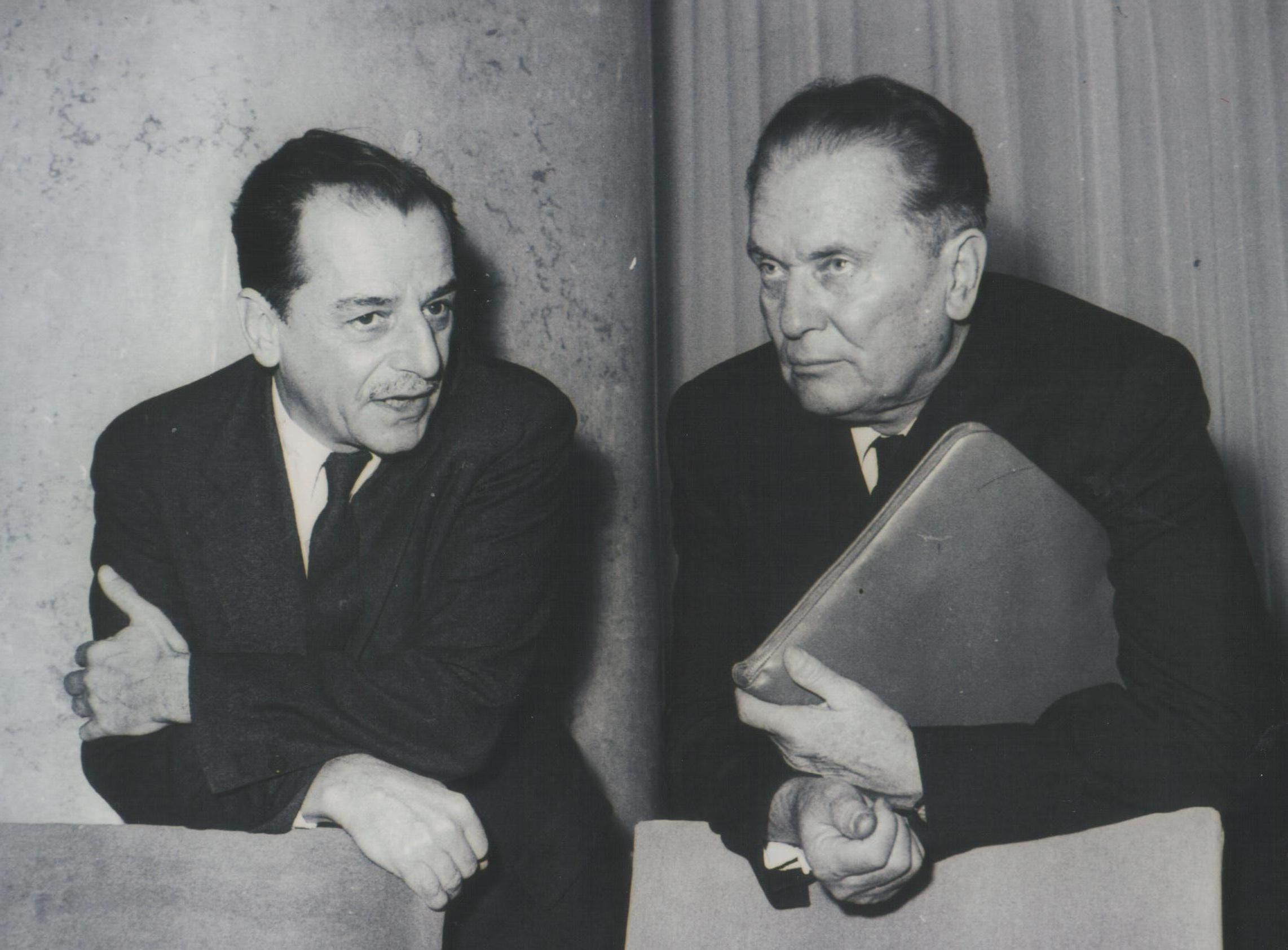
Popović pictured with Josip Broz Tito

Consequently, Popović became the Minister of Foreign Affairs of Yugoslavia in 1953 and held this office until 1965. As Foreign Minister, he was the head of the Yugoslav delegation to the UN General Assembly sessions on several occasions.

From 1965 until 1972, Popović acted as a member of the Federal Executive Council and the Vice President of Yugoslavia from 1966 until 1967. In 1985, he and Peko Dapčević were considered for promotion in rank General of the Army, but they both rejected the proposition.

Popović died in Belgrade in 1992 at the age of 84.

== Honours ==
Yugoslavian decorations
| Order of Freedom |
| Order of the People's Hero |
| Order of the People's Liberation |
| Order of the War Banner |
| Order of the Yugoslav Flag |
| Order of the Partisan Star |
| Order of the Republic |
| Order of Merits for the People |
| Order of Brotherhood and Unity |
| Order of Labour |
| Order of Military Merits |
| Order of Bravery |
| Commemorative Medal of the Partisans of 1941 |
| Order of the Yugoslav Crown |
International and foreign awards
| Order of the Falcon, (Iceland) |
| Order of the White Rose of Finland, (Finland) |
| Order of the Union of Burma, (Myanmar) |
| Order of the Leader, (Kingdom of Afghanistan) |
| Order of Menelik II, (Ethiopian Empire) |
| Order of the Partisan Star (Albania) |
| Order of May, (Argentina) |
| Order of the Southern Cross, (Brazil) |
| Order of People's Freedom, (Bulgaria) |
| Order of George I, (Kingdom of Greece) |
| Order of Merit of the Italian Republic (Italy) |
| Royal Order of Cambodia, (Cambodia) |
| Order of the Flag of the Republic of Hungary, (Hungarian People's Republic) |
| Order of the Aztec Eagle, (Mexico) |
| Order of St. Olav, (Norway) |
| Order of Suvorov, (Soviet Union) |
| Jubilee Medal "Twenty Years of Victory in the Great Patriotic War 1941–1945", (Soviet Union) |
| Order of the Two Niles, (Sudan) |
| Order of the Republic, (Tunisia) |
| Order of Orange-Nassau, (Netherlands) |
| Queen Elizabeth II Coronation Medal, (United Kingdom) |
| Legion of Honour, (France) |
| Legion of Honour, (France) |
| Order of the White Lion, (Czechoslovakia) |
| Czechoslovak Military Order for Liberty, (Czechoslovakia) |
| Czechoslovak War Cross 1939–1945, (Czechoslovakia) |
| Order of Merit, (Chile) |
| Order of Liberty, (Spanish Republican government in exile) |

== See also ==
- Socialist Federal Republic of Yugoslavia
- Yugoslav People's Army
- Yugoslav Partisans
- Titoism
- Josip Broz Tito

Political offices
| Preceded by Aleksandar Ranković | Vice President of Yugoslavia; 1966–1967 | Succeeded by Office dissolved |
| Preceded by Edvard Kardelj | Minister of Foreign Affairs; 1953–1965 | Succeeded by Marko Nikezić |
Military offices
| Preceded by Arso Jovanović as Chief of the General Staff of the People's Liberation Army of Yugoslavia | Chief of the General Staff of the Yugoslav Army (Since 1951 Yugoslav People's Army); 11 September 1945 – 27 January 1953 | Succeeded by Peko Dapčević |
