= Krste Crvenkovski =

Yugoslav communist political leader

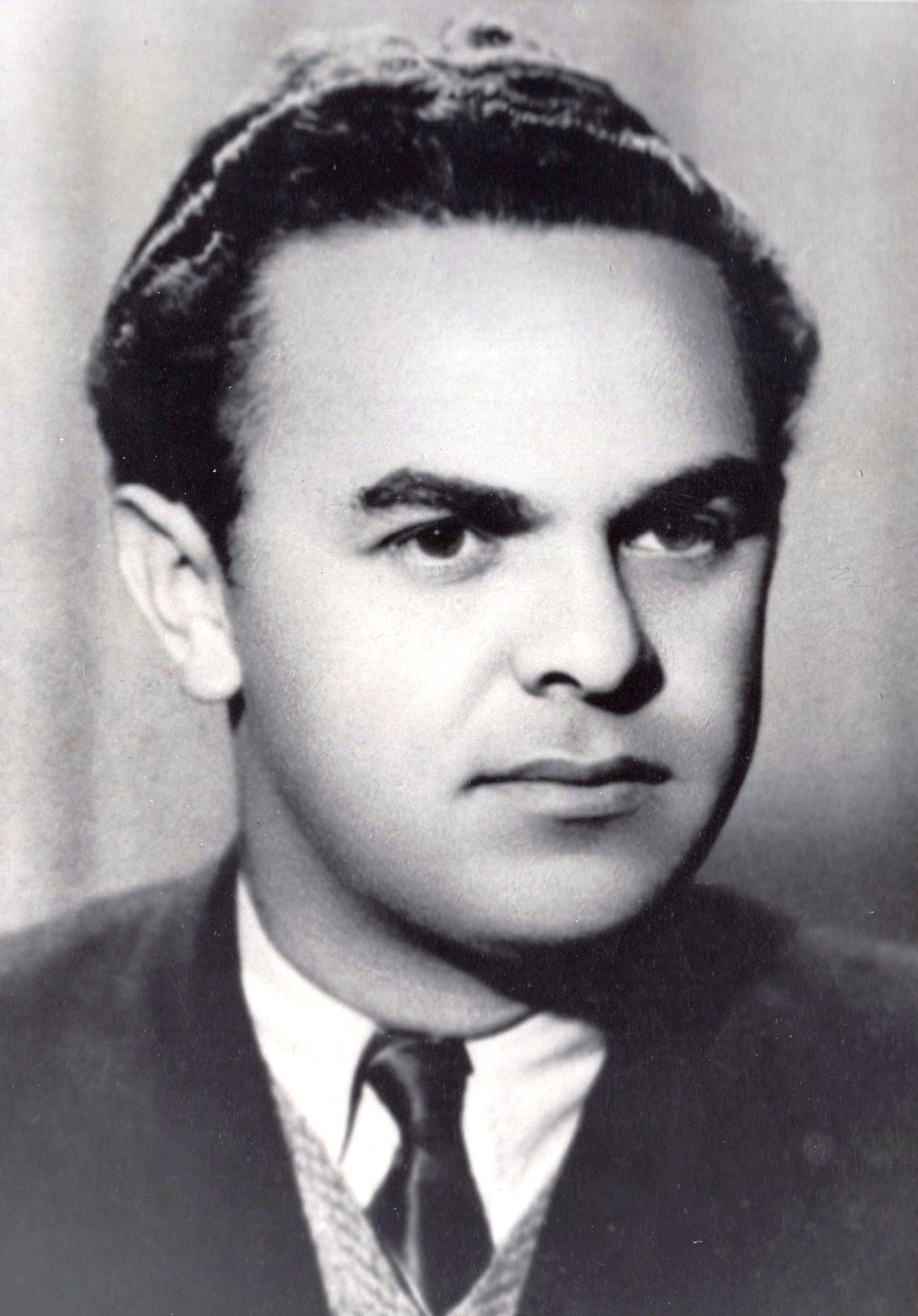
Krste Crvenkovski

Krste Trajkov Crvenkovski (Macedonian: Крсте Трајков Црвенковски; July 16, 1921 – July 21, 2001) was a Macedonian and Yugoslav communist political leader and partisan. He was president of the League of Communists of Macedonia from July 1963 to March 1969, and served as the inaugural vice president of the newly-formed presidency from July 1971 to August 1972.

He was a political opponent to the dominant political course of Lazar Koliševski.

== Life ==
Crvenkovski was born in Prilep, Kingdom of Yugoslavia, on July 16, 1921. His relative was the Bulgarian interwar publisher and journalist, Danail Krapchev. He became a member of League of Communist Youth of Yugoslavia (SKOJ) in 1935, later becoming a member of the Communist Party of Yugoslavia (KPJ) and the local party committee in Prilep. Crvenkovski participated in the attack against the Bulgarian police station in his native town on October 11, 1941, beginning the communist resistance during World War II in Yugoslav Macedonia. He served as the political commissar of the partisan detachment "Goce Delčev". Crvenkovski later served as the secretary of the district committee of KPJ in Tetovo and illegally published the party's newspaper Brotherhood. In September 1942, he was arrested in Gostivar and imprisoned in Tirana, but he escaped in April 1943 and became a secretary of a district committee of the Communist Party of Macedonia (KPM). In December 1943, Crvenkovski became an organizer of the Founding Congress of the People's Liberation Youth Union of Macedonia. He initially served as its secretary, and subsequently as its chairman. After the capitulation of Italy, he became the organizational secretary of SKOJ for Yugoslav Macedonia. In June 1944, he was appointed as the deputy political commissar of the First Macedonian-Kosovar Assault Brigade. In 1948, Crvenkovski was elected as a member of the politburo of the KPM's Central Committee. Crvenkovski was awarded the Order of the People's Hero in 1953. In the 1950s, he was a Yugoslav minister of education and culture.

As a reformist and liberal politician, he succeeded Lazar Koliševski as the leader of the League of Communists of Macedonia. Crvenkovski was its leader from July 1963 to March 1969. Crvenkovski advocated for decentralization. On June 16, 1966, a special commission led by Crvenkovski was appointed by the executive bureau of the Central Committee of the League of Communists of Yugoslavia, to prepare a case against Aleksandar Ranković for violations of party discipline, who ended up being removed from power. In May 1967, an informal agreement was reached between him and Bulgarian leader Todor Zhivkov on avoiding topics about historical disputes during international political contacts, but permitting historians to deal with them. Crvenkovski supported the reform movement to protect Macedonian political autonomy. Crvenkovski's government limited state industrial subsidies and closed inefficient enterprises. However, Crvenkovski was blamed for causing rising unemployment and in 1969, he was moved to the federal administration and removed from the party's leadership by Koliševski's right-hand man, Angel Čemerski. In 1972, Čemerski expelled Crvenkovski's supporters. In 1974, Čemerski accused him of supporting "anarcho-liberalism" and nationalism, thus Crvenkovski was forced to retire from politics.

He and Slavko Milosavlevski challenged the myth of the significance of the communist partisan resistance movement against the Bulgarian Army during World War II, as well as challenging the significance of Koliševski in organizing this resistance. His son, Stevo, was a Macedonian diplomat. Crvenkovski died in Skopje on July 21, 2001. On August 2, 2022, Crvenkovski was posthumously honored with the Order of the Republic of North Macedonia by president Stevo Pendarovski.
