= Ante Marković =

Last Prime Minister of Yugoslavia from 1989 to 1991

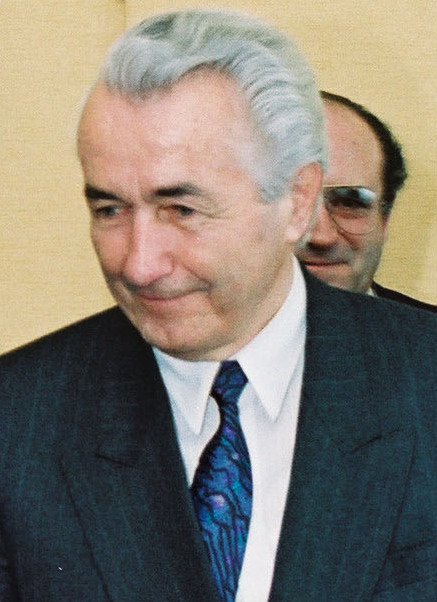
- Marković in 1990

27th Prime Minister of Yugoslavia President of the Federal Executive Council
- In office 16 March 1989 – 20 December 1991
- President: Raif Dizdarević (1989); Janez Drnovšek (1989–1990); Borisav Jović (1990–1991); Sejdo Bajramović (1991); Stjepan Mesić (1991); Branko Kostić (1991)
- Deputy: Aleksandar Mitrović; Živko Pregl (1989–1991)
- Preceded by: Branko Mikulić
- Succeeded by: Aleksandar Mitrović (acting); Office abolished

Vice-President of the Presidency of the Socialist Republic of Croatia
- In office 10 May 1988 – 16 March 1989
- President: Ivo Latin
- Preceded by: Ivo Latin

President of the Presidency of the Socialist Republic of Croatia
- In office 9 May 1986 – 9 May 1988
- Prime Minister: Antun Milović
- Preceded by: Ema Derossi-Bjelajac
- Succeeded by: Ivo Latin

President of the Executive Council of the Socialist Republic of Croatia
- In office 10 May 1982 – 10 May 1986
- President: Marijan Cvetković; Milutin Baltić; Jakša Petrić; Pero Car; Ema Derossi-Bjelajac
- Preceded by: Petar Fleković
- Succeeded by: Antun Milović

Personal details
- Born: 25 November 1924 Konjic, Kingdom of Serbs, Croats and Slovenes (modern Bosnia and Herzegovina)
- Died: 28 November 2011 (aged 87) Zagreb, Croatia
- Party: League of Communists of Yugoslavia (1943–1990); Union of Reform Forces of Yugoslavia (1990–1991)
- Education: University of Zagreb

Ante Marković (Note: pronounced [ǎːnte mǎːrkoʋit͡ɕ]; Serbo-Croatian Cyrillic: Анте Марковић) (25 November 1924 – 28 November 2011) was a Yugoslav politician, businessman and engineer. He is most notable for having served as the last Prime Minister of Yugoslavia from 1989 to 1991.

== Early life ==
Marković was a Bosnian Croat, born in Konjic, then a part of the Kingdom of Serbs, Croats, and Slovenes, presently in Bosnia and Herzegovina to a poor peasant family. In 1943 he joined the Communist Party of Yugoslavia and fought with the Yugoslav Partisans in World War II. He received a degree in electrical engineering from the Electrotechnical Department of the Technical Faculty of the University of Zagreb in 1954. He remained in Zagreb, where he was a director of Rade Končar Industrial Works from 1961 to 1984.

== Political career ==
=== President of Croatia ===
In 1986, he became president of the Presidency of Socialist Republic of Croatia replacing Ema Derossi-Bjelajac. He held that position until 1988, when he was replaced by Ivo Latin.

=== Prime Minister of Yugoslavia ===
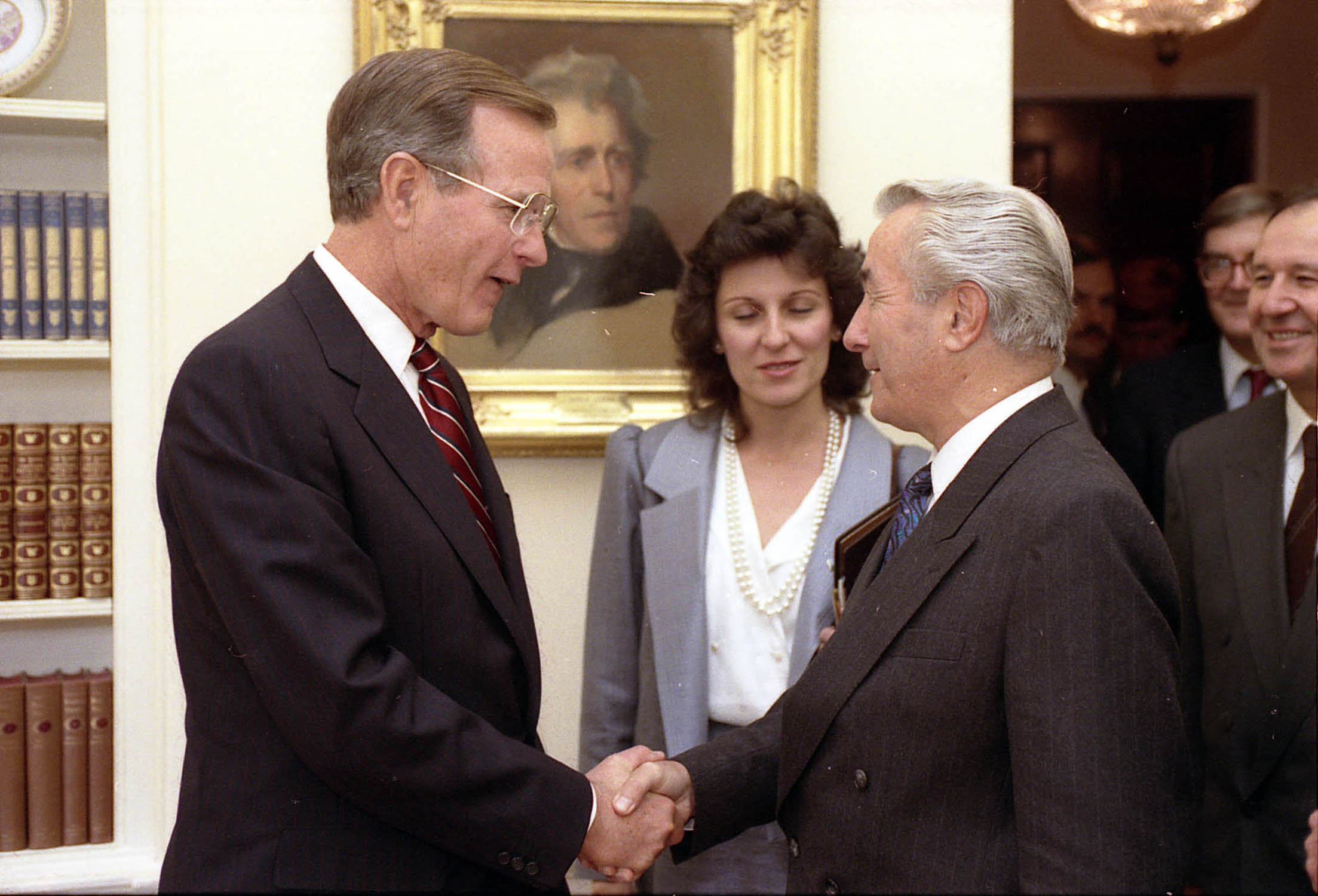
Marković meeting with U.S. President George H. W. Bush in the White House, 1989

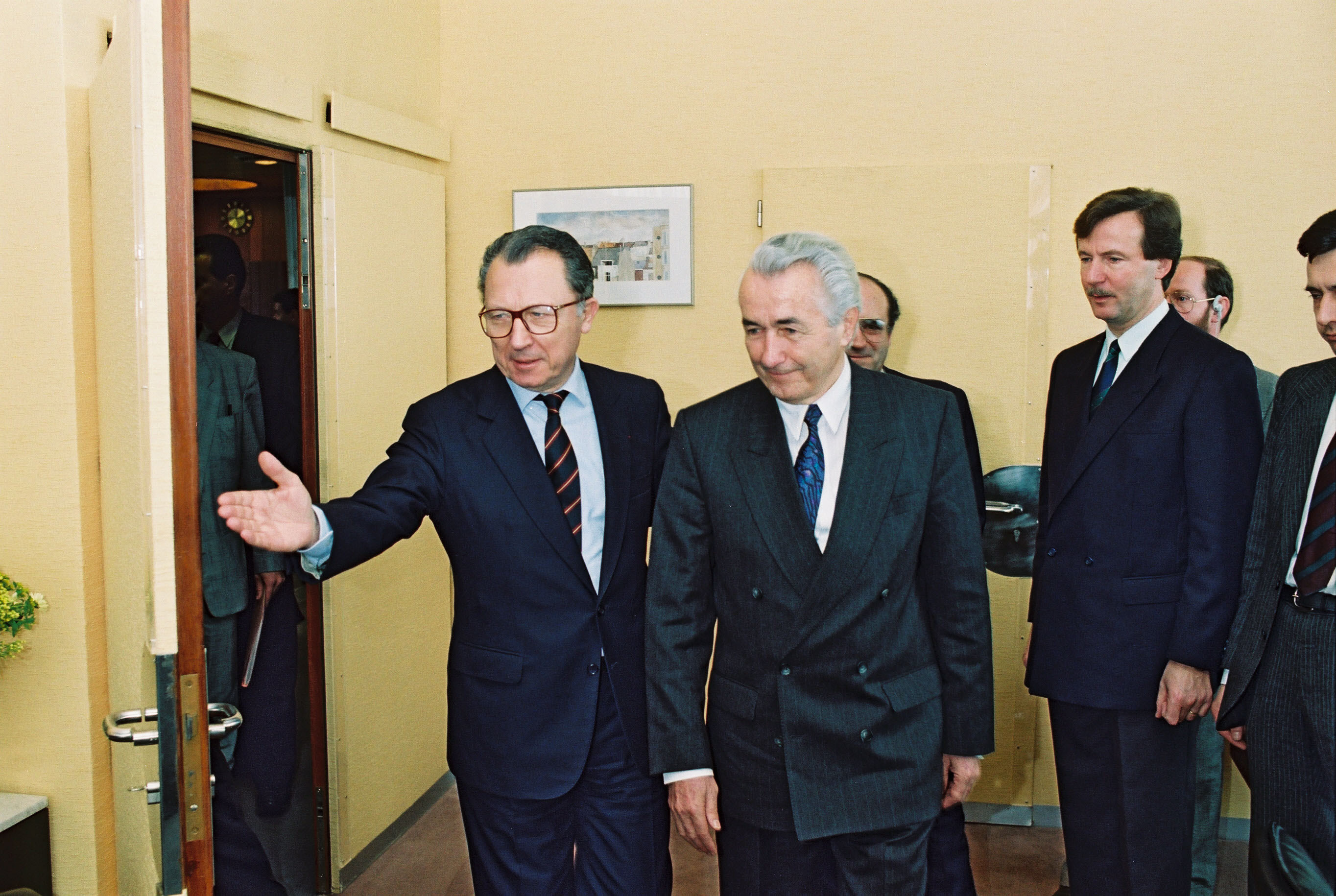
Marković meeting with President of the European Commission Jacques Delors in Brussels, 8 March 1990

He became prime minister in March 1989 following the resignation of Branko Mikulić. After that decision had become public, the U.S. had anticipated cooperation because Marković was known "to favor market-oriented reforms" – the BBC declared that he is "Washington's best ally in Yugoslavia". At the end of the year, Marković launched a new and ambitious program of unprecedented economic reforms, including the establishment of a fixed exchange rate, the privatization of failing social enterprises, as well as a program of trade liberalization. The result of his economic reforms was a halt to inflation, leading to a rise in Yugoslavia's standard of living. Nonetheless, the short-term effect of economic reforms undertaken by Marković led to a decline in Yugoslavia's industrial sector. Numerous bankruptcies occurred as socially-owned enterprises struggled to compete in a more free market environment, a fact later wielded against Marković by many of his opponents. By 1990, the annual rate of growth in GDP had declined to −7.5%.

Marković was the most popular politician in Yugoslavia and owed his popularity to his image of a modern Western-styled politician. He had become a leading political figure for those who wanted Yugoslavia to be transformed into a modern, democratic federation. Marković also maintained popularity by staying out of increasingly virulent quarrels within the leadership of the League of Communists of Yugoslavia or trying to act as mediator between various republics.

When the League of Communists of Yugoslavia broke up in January 1990, Marković had only his popularity and the apparent success of his economic program on his side. In July 1990, he formed the Union of Reform Forces of Yugoslavia (Savez reformskih snaga), a political party supporting a more centralized Yugoslav Federation, and accession to the European Community.

This decision was not well received. Borisav Jović, then the President of the Presidency of Yugoslavia, commented

The general conclusion is that Ante Markovic is no longer acceptable or reliable to us. No one has any doubts in their mind any longer that he's the extended arm of the United States in terms of overthrowing anyone who ever thinks of socialism, and it is through our votes that we appointed him Prime Minister in the Assembly. He is playing the most dangerous game of treason.

Jović concluded that Marković

was no doubt the most active creator of the destruction of our economy, and to a large extent a significant participant in the break-up of Yugoslavia. Others, when boasted of having broken up Yugoslavia wanted to take this infamous role upon themselves but in all these respects they never came close to what Marković did, who had declared himself as the protagonist of Yugoslavia's survival

Later, his programme was sabotaged by Slobodan Milošević who

had virtually sealed Markovic's failure by December 1990 by secretly securing an illegal loan worth $1.7 billion from Serbia's main bank to ease his reelection that month. The loan undermined Markovic's economic austerity program, undoing the progress that had been made toward controlling the country's inflation rate.

Christopher Bennet, in Yugoslavia's Bloody Collapse, stated:

Quite simply, the bank printed whatever money Milošević felt he needed to get himself reelected and the size of the 'loan' became clear a few weeks later when inflation took off again throughout the country. As the economy resumed its downward slide, Marković knew his enterprise had failed [...]

The authority of the federal government was further diminished by secessionist moves in Slovenia and Croatia. In the last months of his tenure Marković tried to find a compromise between secessionists and those demanding that Yugoslavia remain a single entity. His efforts, although favored by the governments in Bosnia and Herzegovina and Macedonia, ultimately failed, because the Yugoslav People's Army, which should have served the interests of top-level governance, sided with Milošević. Frustrated and politically impotent, Marković told his cabinet in September 1991 what he had gleaned from a wiretap that had come into his possession, which detailed a plan to partition Bosnia and Herzegovina:

The line has been clearly established [between the Serbian government, the army and Serb politicians in Bosnia]. I know because I heard Slobodan Milošević give the order to Radovan Karadžić to get in contact with General Uzelac and to order, following the decisions of the meeting of the military hierarchy, that arms should be distributed and that the TO of Krajina and Bosnia be armed and utilized in the realization of the RAM plan.

Before he resigned in December 1991, Markovic endorsed the Carrington Plan to transform Yugoslavia into a loose confederation of states as a means to prevent a further escalation of the Yugoslav Wars. In the end, all his efforts failed to stop the violent disintegration of Yugoslavia.

== Assassination attempt ==
Approximately at noon of 7 October 1991, Marković met with Stjepan Mesić, then President of the Presidency of Yugoslavia and Franjo Tuđman, then President of Croatia in the Banski dvori. The purpose of the meeting was to persuade Marković to leave his position as the head of the Yugoslav federal government and endorse Croatian independence. Nonetheless, the persuasion left Marković unfazed and unplacated. The three then moved into the president's office for dessert. Shortly after, the Yugoslav People's Army attempted to assassinate Marković along with the democratically elected leadership of Croatia with a decapitation strike on Banski dvori. Marković immediately blamed Yugoslav defense minister Veljko Kadijević, and refused to return to Belgrade until Kadijević resigned from his post.

== Life after 1991 ==
Following the breakup of Yugoslavia, Marković disappeared from the public eye and decided to work in Austria as an economic adviser. In 1993, he was rumoured to be Tuđman's choice for Croatian prime minister, apparently due to his economic expertise. The post ultimately went to Nikica Valentić, who established many of the same economic reforms that Marković did while prime minister.

In the early 2000s, he worked as an economic advisor to the Macedonian government. In the late 2000s, he worked as an economic advisor to the government of Bosnia and Herzegovina.

Marković also dedicated himself to a business career and spent most of his time in Sarajevo, building luxury apartment buildings and small hydropower plants.

He appeared as a witness at the Slobodan Milošević trial at the ICTY in 2003. This appearance broke his 12 years of silence; after that testimony, he gave an interview to the Zagreb-based Globus news magazine. In his testimony, he stated that Milošević was obviously striving to carve a Greater Serbia out of the ruins of Yugoslavia. He also revealed that both Milošević and Tuđman confirmed to him that in March 1991 in Karađorđevo they made an agreement to partition Bosnia and Herzegovina. Milošević responded by blaming Marković for the intervention of the Yugoslav Army in Slovenia. Marković denied ordering intervention in Slovenia, stating that it was outside his mandate as prime minister of Yugoslavia.

Marković died in the early hours of 28 November 2011, after a short illness, aged 87. Ante Marković was buried in Dubrovnik. His funeral was attended by former Croatian president Stjepan Mesić, Milorad Dodik, as president of the Bosnia and Herzegovina entity Republika Srpska, filmmaker Emir Kusturica among many others. The Croatian Sabor (parliament) also sent their condolences to the family of Ante Marković.

== Notes ==
Political offices
Preceded by Branko Mikulić	Prime Minister of Yugoslavia; 1989–1991	Succeeded by Aleksandar Mitrović (Acting)
