= Aleksandar Ranković =

Yugoslav communist politician (1909–1983)

- Александар Ранковић
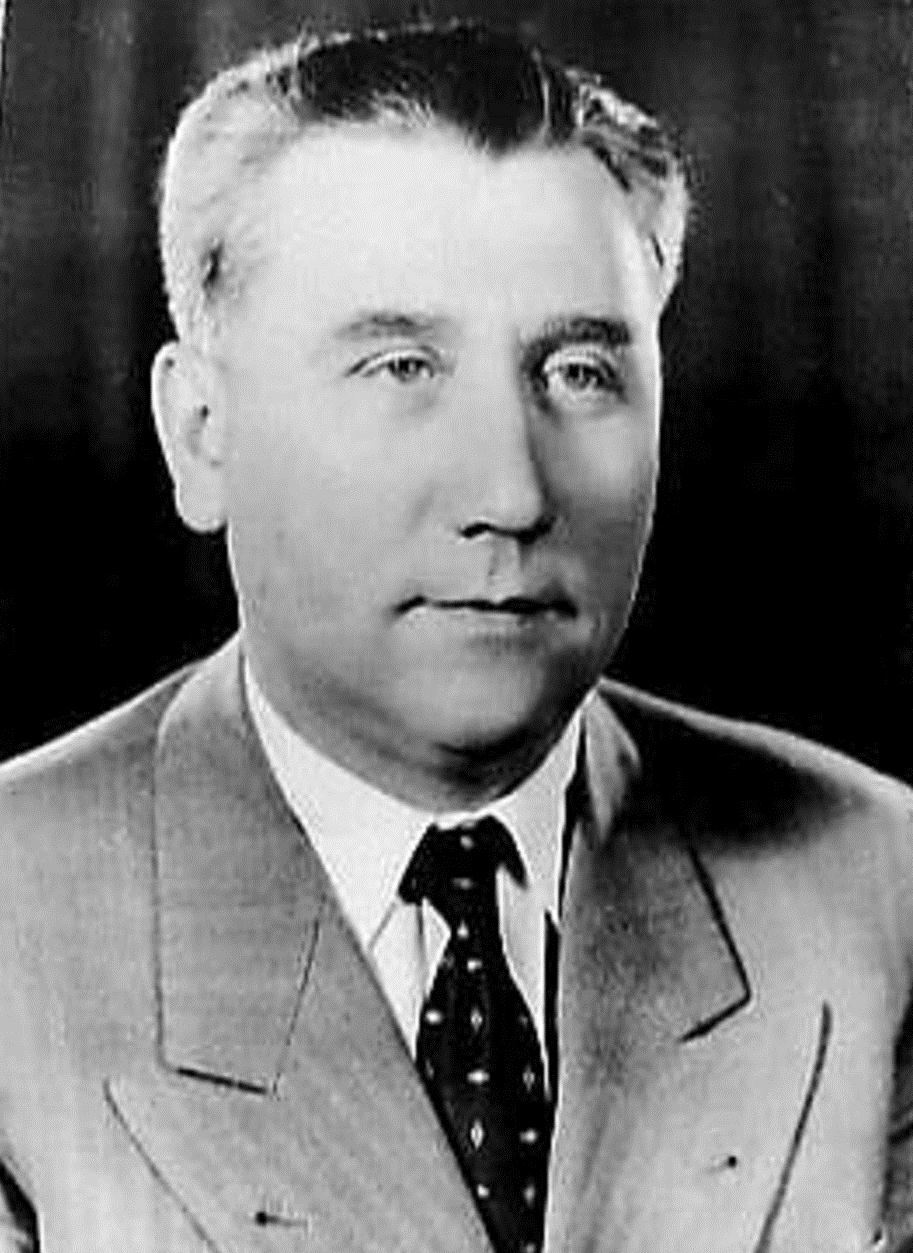
- Ranković in 1960

1st Vice President of Yugoslavia
- In office 30 June 1963 – 1 July 1966
- President: Josip Broz Tito
- Preceded by: Position established
- Succeeded by: Koča Popović

Deputy Prime Minister of Yugoslavia
- In office 1 April 1949 – 18 April 1963
- Prime Minister: Josip Broz Tito
- Preceded by: Jaša Prodanović
- Succeeded by: Svetislav Stefanović

Minister of the Interior
- In office 2 February 1946 – 14 January 1953
- Prime Minister: Josip Broz Tito
- Preceded by: Vlada Zečević
- Succeeded by: Svetislav Stefanović

Chief of OZNA
- In office 13 May 1944 – March 1946

Vice President of the People's Assembly of Serbia
- In office November 1944 – January 1946

Personal details
- Born: 28 November 1909 Draževac, Kingdom of Serbia
- Died: 19 August 1983 (aged 73) Dubrovnik, SR Croatia, SFR Yugoslavia
- Resting place: New Cemetery, Belgrade, Serbia
- Party: Communist Party of Yugoslavia (1928–1966)
- Spouses: Anđa Jovanović (m. 1935; died 1942) Slavka Becele (m. 1946)
- Children: 2
- Occupation: Politician, soldier, worker
- Awards: Order of the People's Hero Order of the Hero of Socialist Labour Order of National Liberation
- Nickname(s): Leka, Marko

Military service
- Allegiance: Yugoslavia
- Branch/service: Yugoslav Partisans
- Years of service: 1941–1945
- Rank: Colonel general
- Battles/wars: World War II in Yugoslavia

Aleksandar Ranković (nom de guerre Marko, nicknamed Leka; Serbian Cyrillic: Александар Ранковић Лека; 28 November 1909 – 19 August 1983) was a Serbian and Yugoslav communist politician, considered to be the third most powerful man in Yugoslavia after Josip Broz Tito and Edvard Kardelj. Ranković was a proponent of a centralized Yugoslavia and opposed efforts that promoted decentralization that he deemed to be against the interests of the Serbian people; he ensured Serbs had a strong presence in Serbia's Socialist Autonomous Province of Kosovo's nomenklatura. Ranković cautioned against separatist forces in Kosovo who were commonly suspected of pursuing seditious activities.

The popularity of Ranković in Serbia became apparent at his funeral in 1983, which large numbers of people attended. Many considered Ranković a Serbian "national" leader. Ranković's policies have been perceived as the basis of the policies of Slobodan Milošević.

== Early life ==
Ranković was born in the village of Draževac near Obrenovac in the Kingdom of Serbia. Born into a poor family, Ranković lost his father at a young age. He attended primary school in his hometown. He went to Belgrade to work and joined the workers' movement. He was also influenced by his colleagues who, at the time when the Communist Party was banned, brought communist magazines and literature with them, which were read by Ranković. At age 15 he joined the union. In 1927 he met his future wife Anđa, and a year later he joined the Communist Party of Yugoslavia. Soon he was named Secretary-General of the League of Communists of Youth of Yugoslavia (SKOJ) in Belgrade.

== Interwar Yugoslavia ==
After becoming a member of the then-illegal Communist Party in 1928, Ranković was named Secretary of the Communist Youth of Serbia. Undeterred by the January 6th Dictatorship, the group continued producing political flyers to be distributed in Belgrade and Zemun. During a police raid, one of the other activists was arrested and gave up the identities of the other members.

Ranković was put on trial before the National Court for the Protection of the State in May of 1929, and was ultimately sentenced to 6 years in prison. During his incarceration in Sremska Mitrovica and Lepoglava, he remained active in promoting Marxism and Leninism to younger prisoners, and fought to improve the living conditions for political prisoners.

After his release from prison, he met Anđa Jovanović and the two were married shortly thereafter. After completing his compulsory military service, the pair moved to Belgrade in January of 1937. While working as a member of the League of Communists of Serbia during this time, he was promoted to secretary by Tito, a role which he held until 1941.

While living illegally in Belgrade, he began to go by the name "Marko", replacing his previous nickname, "Leka". In October 1940, Ranković participated in the Fifth Land Conference of the KPJ held in Zagreb.

== Communist Yugoslavia ==
Ranković was a member of the Politburo from 1940. At the beginning of the Axis occupation of Yugoslavia Ranković was secretary of the Central Committee of the Communist Party of Croatia. Ranković was first member of the Central Committee of the Communist Party of Yugoslavia who came to Belgrade after it was occupied in April 1941. Ranković was ordered by Tito to investigate why members of the Serbian Communist Party left Belgrade and went to rural region of Serbia, and invited them to return to Belgrade. The order was followed by all 250 communists from Belgrade, except Vasilije Buha.

"I, who surveilled everyone, from assembly to bedrooms, was the last one to find out what's being planned for me."
Ranković, in his memoirs

Ranković was captured and tortured by the German Gestapo in 1941 but was later rescued in a daring raid by Yugoslav Partisans. His wife and mother were killed by the Gestapo during the war. Ranković served on the Supreme Staff throughout the war. He was named a "People's Hero" for his services during World War II.

In May 1944, Ranković created OZNA, the Partisan's security agency. After the war, he became minister of the interior and chief of the military intelligence agency UDBA, which had replaced OZNA.

In 1959, Edvard Kardelj, then Deputy Prime Minister of Yugoslavia, was shot and wounded by Jovan Veselinov during a hunt. Although the official police investigation concluded that Veselinov had been shooting at a wild boar and Kardelj was struck by a ricochet from a rock, it was suggested at the time that the assassination attempt was orchestrated by his political rival Ranković or Ranković's, ally Slobodan Penezić.

=== Socialist Autonomous Province of Kosovo ===
A state of emergency that existed throughout Yugoslavia until 1948 was maintained in Kosovo till the middle of the 1960s. Kosovo Albanians were singled out for harsher treatment as they had resisted the reinstatement of Yugoslav control after the end of the Second World War. President Tito granted the security forces of Ranković the task to bring Albanians under control. Ranković supported a centralised Soviet style system. He was against the Albanian population gaining further autonomy in Kosovo and Ranković had misgivings and a strong dislike of Albanians. Kosovo was seen by Ranković as a security threat for the country and its unity.

Following the Yugoslav-Soviet Union split (1948), local Albanians were viewed by the state as possible collaborators of pro-Soviet Albania and consequently Kosovo became an area of focus for the secret service and police force under Ranković. During Ranković's campaign, members of the Albanian intelligentsia were targeted, whereas thousands of other Albanians underwent trials and were jailed for "Stalinism". Ranković was one of Tito's close political and influential associates that oversaw the purges of communists accused of being pro-Stalin following the Soviet-Yugoslav split. The secret police operating in the People's Republic of Macedonia, Montenegro and Serbia were under the full control of Ranković, unlike in Bosnia, Croatia and Slovenia, due to national tensions in the organisation. Ranković was considered as a figure of conservative political elements within Yugoslavia that did not favour democratisation or reform.

Between 1945–1966, Ranković upheld Serbian minority control of mainly Albanian inhabited Kosovo through repressive anti-Albanian policies by the secret police. In Kosovo, the period 1947–1966 is colloquially known as "the Ranković era". During this time Kosovo became a police state under Ranković and his secret police force. Policies promoted by Serb nationalists were employed against Albanians by Ranković that involved terrorisation and harassment. These efforts were undertaken through the pretense of illegal weapons searches or police actions that involved torture and the death of alleged and real political opponents, often referred to as "irredentists". To a lesser extent, Ranković also undertook similar campaigns toward the Hungarians of Vojvodina and Muslims of Sandžak. Ranković along with other Serb communist members opposed the recognition of Bosniak nationality.

Kosovo under the control of Ranković was viewed by Turkey as the individual that would implement "the Gentleman's Agreement", a deal (1953) reached between Tito and Turkish foreign Minister Mehmet Fuat Köprülü that promoted Albanian emigration to Anatolia. Factors involved in the upsurge of migration were intimidation and pressure toward the Albanian population to leave through a campaign headed by Ranković that officially was stated as aimed at curbing Albanian nationalism. Large numbers of Albanians and Sandžak Muslims left Yugoslavia for Turkey, whereas Montenegrin and Serb families were installed in Kosovo during the period under Ranković.

Opposition grew to his rigid policies on Kosovo and also for policies undertaken in Croatia and Slovenia. Over time, evidence against Ranković was collected by his opponents. The secret police force under Ranković had spied on individuals belonging to the communist leadership group, with reports of attempted blackmail involving their personal information. Ranković was also alleged to have bugged Tito's bedroom. The situation ended in July 1966 with the removal of Ranković and his associates from their positions. Ranković was dismissed from the communist party (SKJ) and prohibited from participating in public functions. Yugoslav authorities stopped short of criminally prosecuting Ranković through a trial. The official reason given was that the alleged conspiracy involving his associates never materialised and that Ranković had earned respectability due to his participation in the development of the country. Edina Bećirević states that the actual reason was Ranković had extensive surveillance accumulated by his secret police that could compromise a large portion of the Yugoslav leadership, even Tito. As such, prosecuting Ranković was unfeasible. The events around the dismissal of Ranković were depicted by the communist government as case of "Greater Serbian hegemony".

Following his dismissal, the government repression under Ranković in Kosovo toward Albanians was revealed and his patriotic pursuit to secure the region was debunked. Albanians gained wider freedom in Yugoslavia as a consequence of the downfall of Ranković. The removal of Ranković was positively received by Albanians and some other Yugoslavs, whereas it generated concerns within Yugoslavia that Serbs would become vulnerable and lack protection in Kosovo. Tito made a visit to Kosovo (spring 1967) and admitted to mistakes having been made in previous years. Reforms decentralising government and greater powers for the republics were enacted after the Ranković era and Tito changed his view and stated that recognition of Muslims and their national identity should occur. Serb nationalists within the communist party warned Tito that the removal of Ranković was an unforgivable offense to Serbs in the country as he represented Serbia. Ranković thereafter for the duration of his life kept a low profile until his death.

=== Fall from power ===
His fall from power marked the beginning of the end of a centralized power structure of the League of Communists of Yugoslavia over the country and the social and political separatist and autonomist movements that would culminate in the Croatian Spring and the newly de-centralized Yugoslavia that emerged from the 1971 constitutional reforms and later the 1974 Constitution.

== Death ==
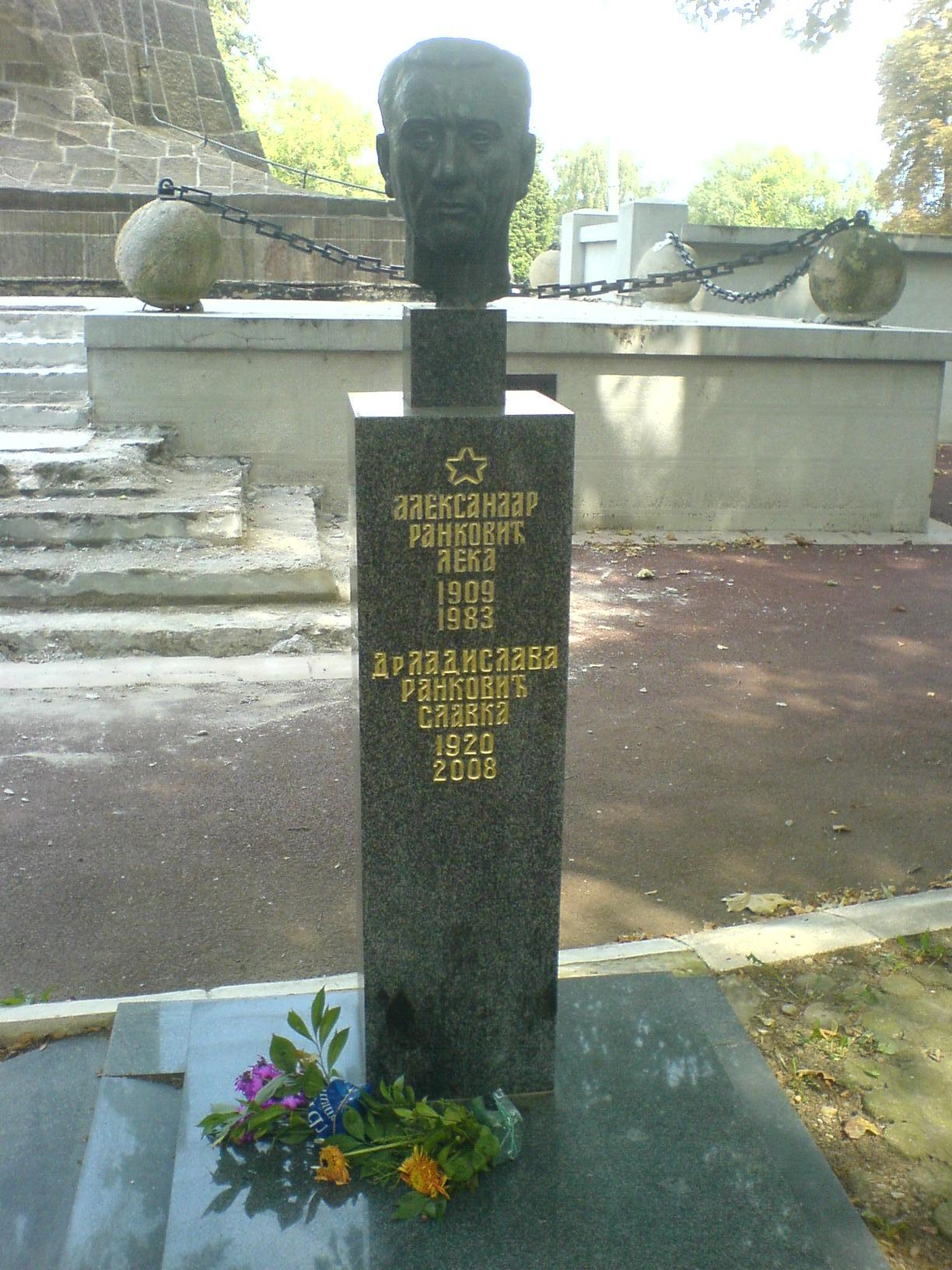
Ranković's grave in Belgrade

Ranković retired to Dubrovnik, where he died on 19 August 1983 after suffering a second heart attack.

On Belgrade airport his coffin was awaited only by the representatives of the Veteran's Union (SUBNOR). While he was in the hospital, someone broke into Ranković's house and stole all of his medals, so his family began to gather medals from his former war comrades to display them at the funeral, but in the end SUBNOR provided the replacement medals. It was forbidden to the citizens and organizations to post obituaries. Obituary was only allowed to his family and only on the day of the funeral.

Despite all that censorship, the day of the funeral was a major shock to the state and party authorities. No salvos or fanfares were allowed, either but, spontaneously, a huge crowd of people showed at the Belgrade New Cemetery. They applauded and cheered 'Leka, Leka' and since there was no place for everyone, people were climbing on the trees and tombstones. The number of the people who attended the funeral is still not established. State agency Tanjug reported 1,000, while rumors all over Serbia talked about several hundred thousands. Historians and reporters, more-or-less, agreed on 100,000. The funeral itself became a Serb "nationalistic event" where attendees expressed sentiments that a Ranković figure was required in Kosovo to control the Albanian population.

== Legacy ==
In Serbia, the burial of Ranković was the first demonstration by the Serb public against the ideology of Titoism. Abiding by policies of Tito that restricted public sentiments of national division, state authorities and media attempted to sideline the demands of a protest petition and to downplay the nationalist aspects regarding the funeral. The authorities were astounded by the events at the funeral, as they expected people to have forgotten about someone who was in complete media and political isolation for almost two decades. By gathering in such crowds, people showed the government what they thought of it, but also what they thought of all the allegations, isolation and silence which had surrounded Ranković since 1966. Still, the authorities, for years after, did not allow photos where Ranković stood next to Tito or any of the other world leaders. Publishing of his memoirs was also banned for years.

Historians tried to explain such a large number of people as the first massive public event after Tito's death in 1980. Many perceived Ranković as a defender of Yugoslavia and believed that if he had stayed in power, demonstrations and rebellions of the Albanians on Kosovo would not have happened. They demonstrated for the first time just two years after he was removed from office, in 1968, when in Priština, but also in Tetovo in the Socialist Republic of Macedonia, they cheered "Long live Enver Hoxha" and "Long live Great Albania". Further protests followed in 1971 and 1981. However, actions like taking away illegal weapons from the Albanians in Kosovo and the Prizren Trials, were neither his individual actions nor a result of his anti-Albanian attitude, as nothing could be done without Tito's approval or knowledge. Serbian historians do not consider him a Serbian nationalist at all; instead, they see him as a staunch Yugoslav and Tito's loyal associate who stood by him in all the pivotal moments and did not support or protect Serbian politicians who were forced out by Tito, like Blagoje Nešković.

Ordinary people considered him both a victim and a symbol of an era, victim of both the Communist government and of an anti-Serbian conspiracy, as they see him as a Serbian nationalist who repressed the Albanians in Kosovo. For a faction within the Serbian Communist Party that aimed toward state centralisation, Ranković was viewed as a defender of Serb interests. Perspectives of Ranković among Kosovo Serbs was a hope for a return to conditions of the time he was in power, as he represented order and peace. For Kosovo Albanians, Ranković became a symbol that represented misery and suffering, as they associated him with negative actions toward them.

== Awards ==
Egypt:

- Grand Cordon of the Order of the Nile (1956)

== See also ==
- Rankovićism

== Sources ==
- Doder, Duško; Branson, Louise (1999). Milosevic: Portrait of a Tyrant. Free Press. ISBN 0-684-84308-0.
- Miller, Nick (2007). The Nonconformists: Culture, Politics, and Nationalism in a Serbian Intellectual Circle, 1944–1991. Central European University Press. ISBN 978-963-7326-93-6.
- Marcus, Marcus (1997). Croatia: A Nation Forged in War. Yale University Press. ISBN 0-300-06933-2.
- Dimitrijević, Bojan (2020). Ranković: Drugi čovek. Vukotić media. ISBN 978-86-89613-86-5.
- Glišić, Venceslav; Borković, Milan (1975). Komunistička partija Jugoslavije u Srbiji 1941-1945. Rad.
