= Draževac (Obrenovac) =

Draževac Дражевац
- Village
- Interactive map of Draževac
- Coordinates: 44°34′38″N 20°13′52″E
- Country: Serbia
- Municipality: Obrenovac

Area
  - Total: 20.43 km^{2} (7.89 sq mi)
- Elevation: 132 m (433 ft)

Population (2011)
  - Total: 1,442
  - Density: 70.58/km^{2} (182.8/sq mi)
- Time zone: UTC+1 (CET)
  - Summer (DST): UTC+2 (CEST)

Draževac (Serbian: Дражевац) is a village located in the municipality of Obrenovac, Belgrade, Serbia. As of 2011 census, it has a population of 1,442 inhabitants.

== WWII Memorial ==
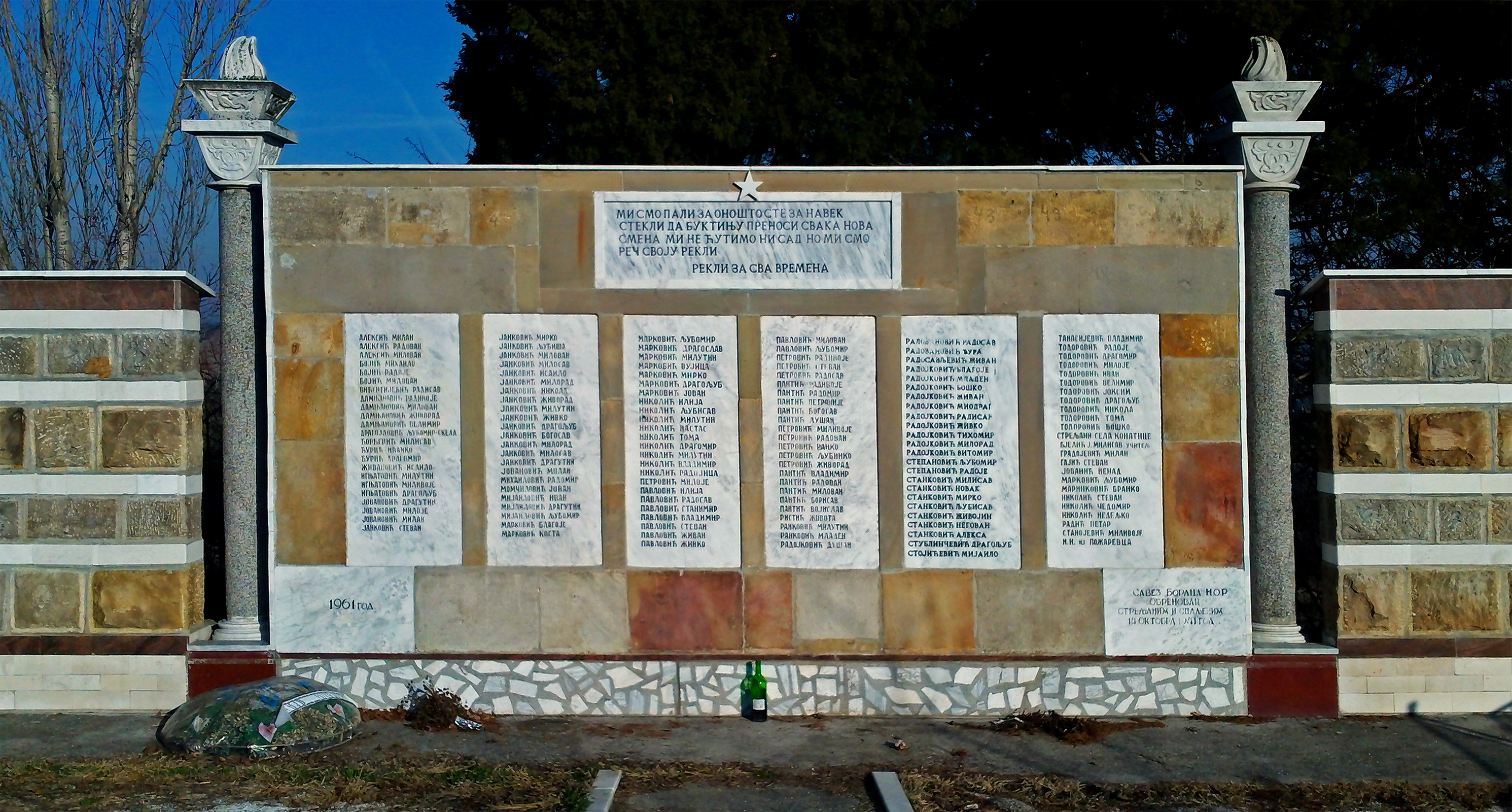

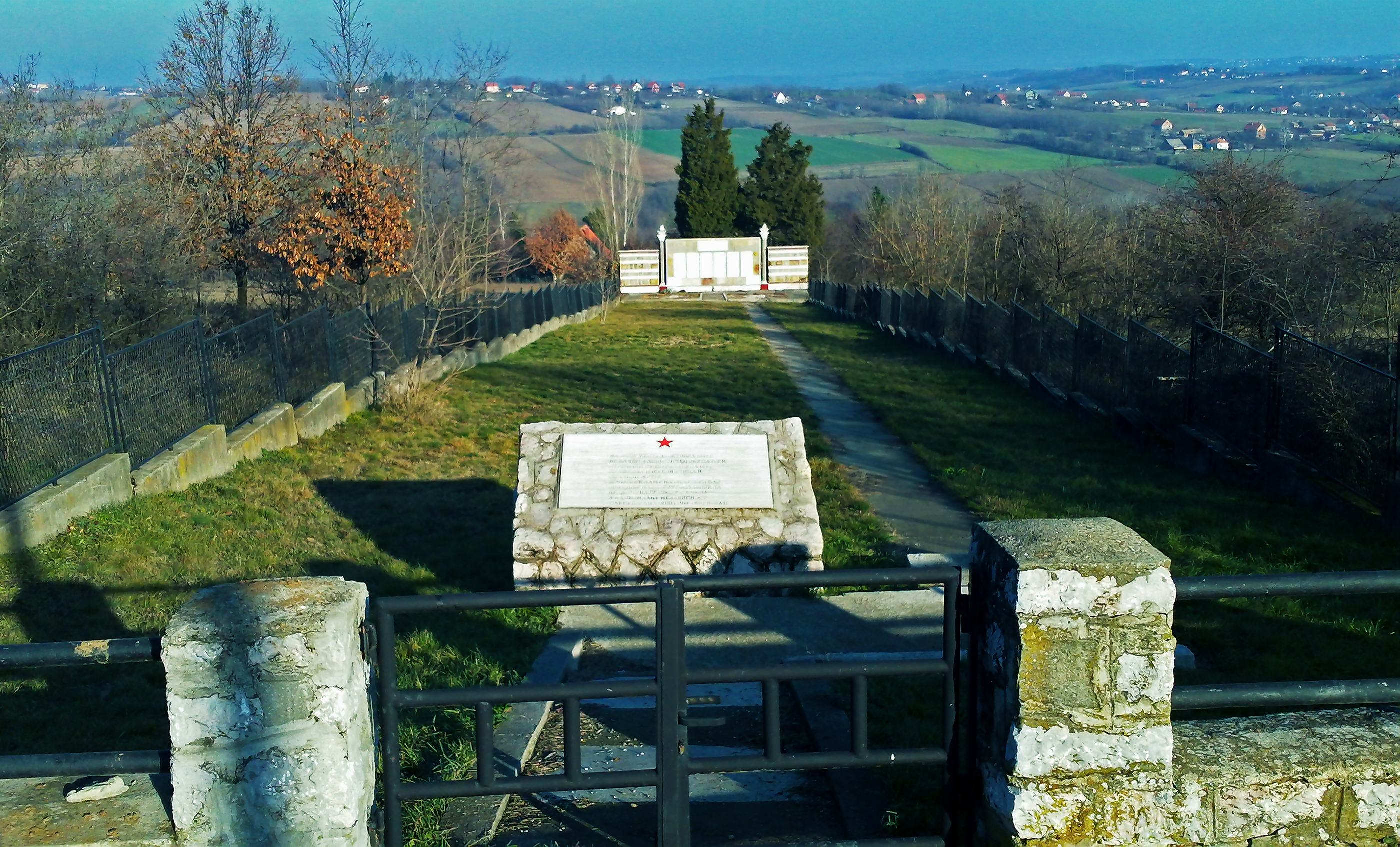

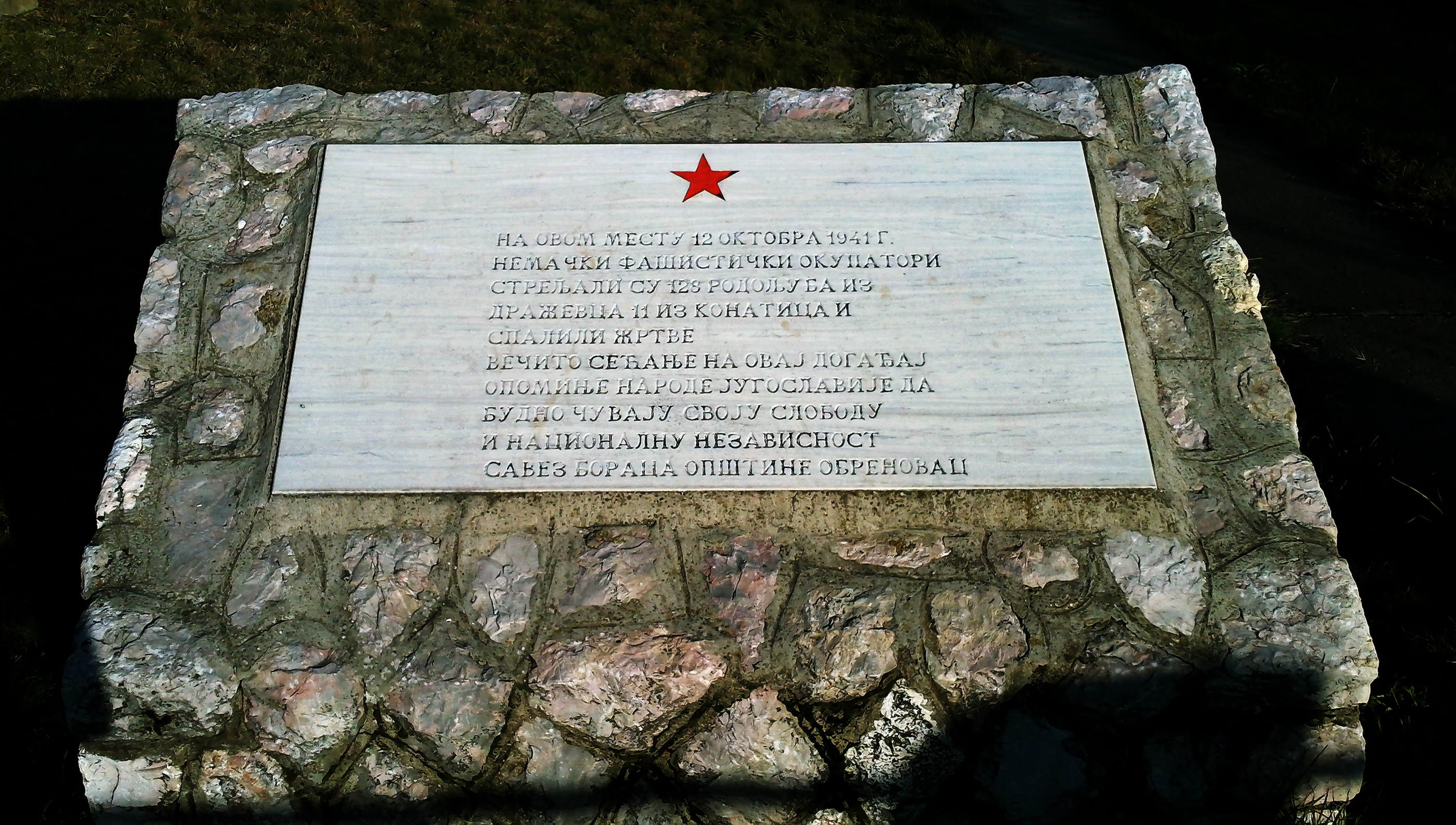
