= Radivoje Jovanović Bradonja =

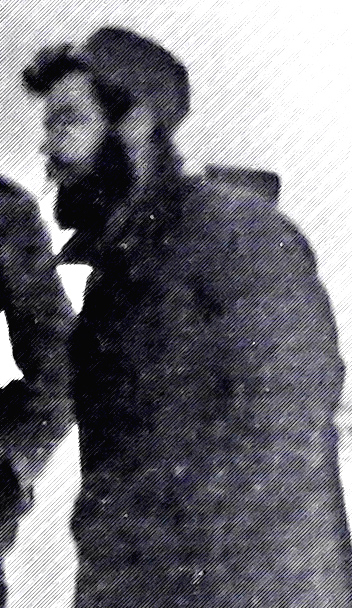
Bradonja, 1942

Radivoje Jovanović Bradonja (Serbian Cyrillic: Радивоје Јовановић Брадоња; 10 November 1918 – 22 June 2000) was a Yugoslav Partisan leader. A skilled military organizer, he was a prominent figure in the 1941 defence of the Republic of Užice and later took part in the 1944 Belgrade offensive that liberated the city from German occupation forces. After World War II, he was a politician and administrator in Serbia and Yugoslavia. His political career ended in the late 1960s.

== Early life and career ==
Jovanović was born in the village of Zarube near Valjevo in what was then the Kingdom of Serbia; forty-one days after his birth, Serbia merged into the newly formed Kingdom of Serbs, Croats, and Slovenes, later known as the Kingdom of Yugoslavia. Jovanović graduated from the Military Academy in 1940 as an artillery second lieutenant.

== Partisan ==
Jovanović returned to his native region and joined the Partisans in April 1941, after the invasion of Yugoslavia by the Axis powers. He took part in the July 1941 uprising in Serbia, becoming commander of the Kolubara company of the Valjevo Partisan detachment. In August 1941, his company destroyed the German garrison at the Lajkovac railway station. He was wounded in battle at Ljig the following month but did not leave his position and was credited for saving his unit from destruction. Subsequently, as deputy commander of the Užice Partisan detachment, he created a plan for the defence of the city that was recognized as vastly superior to that prepared by the general staff.

Although the July 1941 uprising was marked by cooperation between Partisan and Chetnik forces, the two armies had become hostile toward each other by autumn of the same year. Jovanović has been described as the Partisan officer most responsible for uncovering a Chetnik conspiracy against the Partisan forces, and on 2 November 1941 he inflicted the first serious military defeat on the Chetniks. He took part in the Battle of Kadinjača on 29 November and was credited for particular bravery on that occasion, notwithstanding that the Užice Republic fell as a result of the battle.

In August 1942, Jovanović became commander of the National Liberation Movement in Serbia and a member of the Supreme Staff of the National Liberation Army and Partisan Detachments of Yugoslavia. His corps was the first to make contact with the Red Army prior to the liberation of Belgrade in 1944, and he led heavy battles against German forces in the Avala region during the operation. He later took part in the 1945 liberation of Zagreb.

Jovanović was known for his independent spirit and willingness to criticize his own allies. He once described other Yugoslav generals as "stupid" for incurring massive casualties in the Syrmian Front, which he argued was not necessary for the final liberation of Yugoslavia. In the fall of 1944, he arrived at a Red Army base in the middle of negotiations between the Soviet forces and the Chetniks; to the shock of his Russian colleagues, he burst into the negotiation room and fired a machine gun at the Chetnik side.

== Military career after World War II ==
Jovanović attended the Đerzhinski Artillery Academy in Moscow from 1946 to 1948, after which time he returned to Yugoslavia. He became the commander of artillery in the Yugoslav People's Army (JNA) and was responsible for developing the concept of national defense with a focus on territorial defense. He retired in 1959 with the rank of Lieutenant General.

Jovanović was recognized with Yugoslavia's Order of the People's Hero in 1949.

== Politician and administrator ==
Jovanović joined the League of Communists of Yugoslavia (LCY) in August 1941, and on 7 November of the same year he commanded a Partisan military parade in Užice commemorating the anniversary of the October Revolution. During World War II, he was a member of the presidency of the Anti-Fascist Council for the National Liberation of Yugoslavia (AVNOJ). He was elected to the federal committee of the People's Front of Yugoslavia in 1949 and to the federal committee of the successor Socialist Alliance of Working People of Yugoslavia (SSRNJ) in 1953.

He initially appeared on a People's Front electoral list for the 1945 Yugoslavian parliamentary election, though he withdrew from the contest before the final version of the list was released.

Jovanović was chosen as a candidate member of the Central Committee of the League of Communists of Serbia in January 1949. He later appeared in the eighth position on the People's Front list for Serbia in the 1950 Yugoslavian parliamentary election; as there were no other approved lists, this was tantamount to election. As a member of the Yugoslavian parliament's Federal Council, he served on the committee for people's power and the committee for economic planning and finance, and he took part in the debate on the general law on people's committees.

Notwithstanding that he already was a member of the federal assembly, he was also proposed as one of two possible parliamentary candidates for Valjevo in the 1951 Serbian parliamentary election. It does not appear as though he was ultimately elected. He was not a candidate in the 1953 Yugoslavian parliamentary election.

In April 1954, the Central Committee of the League of Communists of Serbia increased its membership from sixty-seven to seventy-one, and Jovanović was elected as a member on the nomination of Aleksandar Ranković. He was elected to a second term in June 1959.

Jovanović was appointed to the executive council of Serbia in September 1959 as Secretary of the Secretariat for Traffic and Roads. While serving in this role, he was a member of the construction committee for New Belgrade. His term on the executive council ended in April 1963.

Jovanović was re-elected to the Yugoslavian parliament's Federal Council under somewhat unusual circumstances in the 1967 Yugoslavian parliamentary election. This election featured competitive elections in several jurisdictions, and a number of "official" candidates were defeated. In Lazarevac, Jovanović was elected in an unprecedented field of five candidates.

His political downfall occurred shortly thereafter. Although Jovanović was not considered as an "opposition" figure at the time of the 1967 election, Serbia's liberal and reformist communist leaders subsequently came to regard him as part of a conservative pro-Ranković faction. (Ranković himself had fallen from power the previous year.) Jovanović was denounced in the 23 November 1967 edition of Borba, and he was accused of working with pro-Chetnik and Serbian nationalist forces to undermine official policy (charges which he denied). Efforts were made to recall him from the federal parliament, and in January 1968 he was expelled from the League of Communists.

== Later life ==
Jovanović attended an AVNOJ reunion event in 1983, a few months after Ranković's funeral.

At the time of the breakup of Yugoslavia in 1990, Jovanović accused the United States of America, the North Atlantic Treaty Organization (NATO), and The Vatican of plotting a war against Yugoslavia on an anti-Serbian basis.

Jovanović died in 2000.

== Electoral record ==
=== Federal (SFR Yugoslavia) ===
1967 Yugoslavian federal election: Federal Council – Lazarevac
Candidate	Party	Votes	%
Radivoje Jovanović	Socialist Alliance of Working People	44,038	57.24
Života Negić	Socialist Alliance of Working People	10,436	13.56
Miodrag Mandić	Socialist Alliance of Working People	10,032	13.04
Rozomir Popović	Socialist Alliance of Working People	6,751	8.77
Sreten Čitako	Socialist Alliance of Working People	5,679	7.38
Total		76,936	100.00
Valid votes		76,936	96.04
Invalid/blank votes		3,176	3.96
Total votes		80,112	100.00
