= President of the Commission on Statutory Questions =

LCY office

- Emblems of the LCY

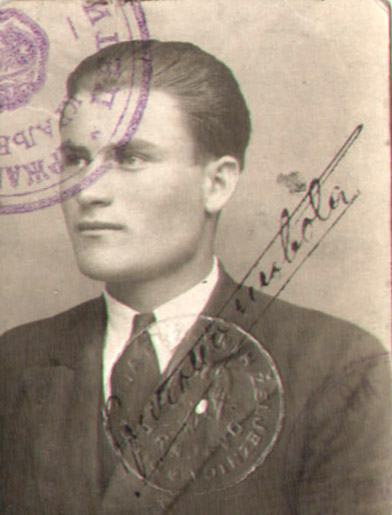
- Longest serving Krsto Popivoda; 7 November 1952 – 13 December 1964
- Seat: Palace of Socio-Political Organisations, Belgrade (1964–91); Marx and Engels Square, Belgrade (1945–1964)
- Appointer: Session of the Commission on Statutory Questions
- Constituting instrument: Statute of the League of Communists of Yugoslavia
- Formation: 29 July 1948
- First holder: Osman Karabegović
- Final holder: Jovo Ugrčić
- Abolished: 22 January 1990

The office of president of the Commission on Statutory Questions of the League of Communists of Yugoslavia (LCY) was established on 29 July 1948 under the name chairman of the Control Commission. From 1948 until the 9th LCY Congress, held in 1969, the officeholder was elected by the Session of the Session of the LCY Central Committee. The 9th Congress amended the party statute, and transformed the Control Commission into the Commission on Statutory Questions, and the chairmanship was renamed president.

== Officeholders ==
Presidents of the Commission on Statutory Questions of the League of Communists of Yugoslavia
No.	Name	Took office	Left office	Tenure	Term of office	Birth	PM	Death	Branch	Ethnicity	Ref.
1	Osman Karabegović	29 July 1948	7 November 1952	4 years, 101 days	5th (1948–1952)	1911	1932	1996	Bosnia-Herzegovina	Muslim	
2	Krsto Popivoda	7 November 1952	13 December 1964	12 years, 36 days	6th–7th (1952–1964)	1910	1933	1988	Montenegro	Montenegrin	
3	Grujo Novaković	13 December 1964	30 May 1974	9 years, 168 days	8th–9th (1964–1974)	1913	1936	1975	Bosnia-Herzegovina	Serb	
4	Milorad-Mičo Zorič	30 May 1974	23 June 1978	4 years, 24 days	10th (1974–1978)	1913	1939	?	Montenegro	Montenegrin	
5	Dimitar Aleksievski	23 June 1978	29 June 1982	4 years, 6 days	11th (1982–1986)	1920	1941	?	Macedonia	Macedonian	
6	Budimir Vukašinović	29 June 1982	28 June 1986	3 years, 364 days	12th (1986–1990)	1921	1944	1989	Serbia	Serb	
7	Jovo Ugrčić	28 June 1986	22 January 1990	3 years, 208 days	13th (1986–1990)	1923	1942	2005	Croatia	Serb	
