= Confederation of Trade Unions of Yugoslavia =

Trade union center and government agency

Confederation of Trade Unions of Yugoslavia SSJ
- Serbo-Croatian: Савез синдиката Југославије, Savez sindikata Jugoslavije; Slovene: Zveza sindikatov Jugoslavije; Macedonian: Сојуз на синдикати на Југославија
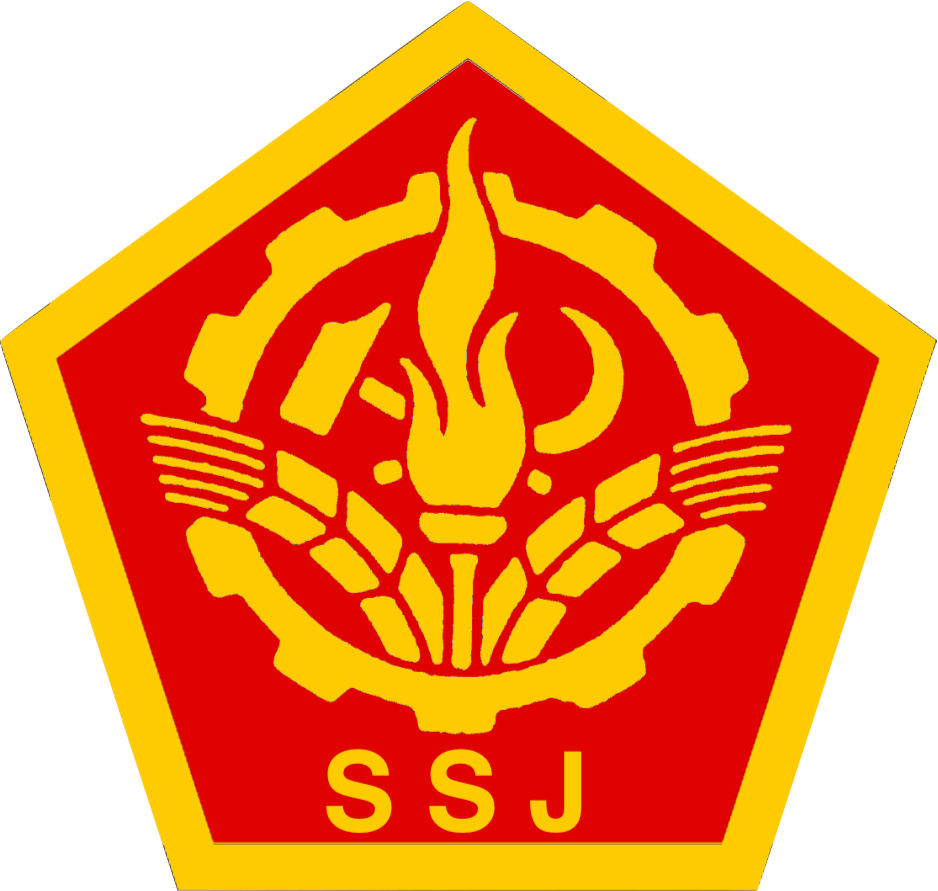
- Emblem

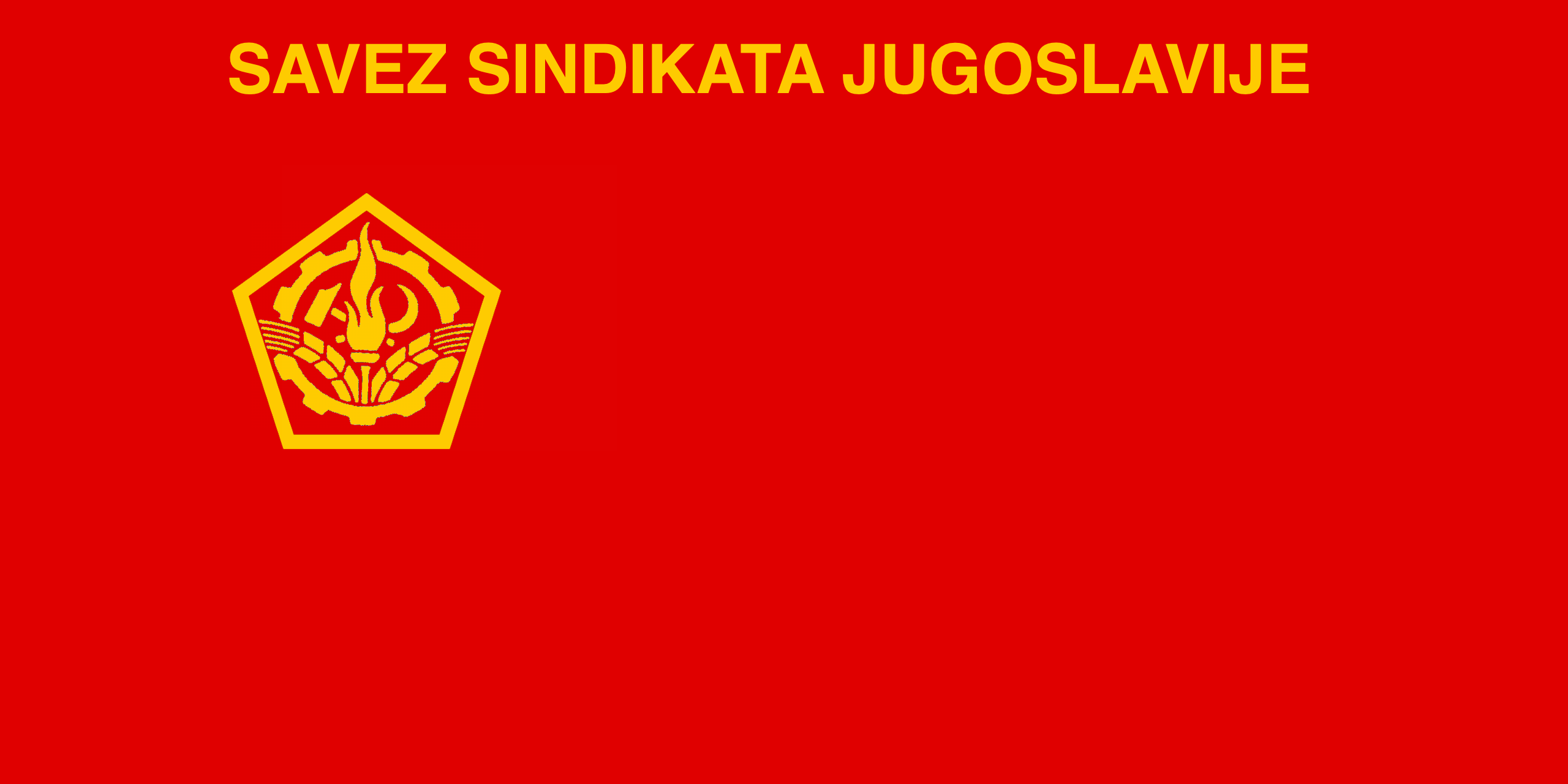
- Flag
- Predecessor: United Federation of Workers' Unions of Yugoslavia
- Formation: 25 January 1945
- Dissolved: 1990
- Headquarters: Ušće Tower, Belgrade
- Location: SFR Yugoslavia
- Members: 6,150,000 (1984)

The Confederation of Trade Unions of Yugoslavia (SSJ) was a mass organization in SFR Yugoslavia that operated as both a centralized body of trade unions and a socio-political organ of the Yugoslav government. It existed as one of the most powerful organizations within the Socialist Alliance of Working People of Yugoslavia, the popular front of the ruling League of Communists. In addition to assisting in the implementation of the Party's domestic labor programs, the SSJ actively sent labor delegations abroad to other countries, with 190 such delegations having been sent in the year 1959 alone. The organization maintained relations with both Western and Eastern labor unions and represented Yugoslavia at the International Labour Organization.

The SSJ was dissolved and succeeded by numerous smaller organizations across the six Yugoslav republics shortly before the Yugoslav Wars in 1990:

- Association of Free Trade Unions of Slovenia
- Confederation of Autonomous Trade Unions of Serbia
- Confederation of Independent Trade Unions of Bosnia and Herzegovina
- Confederation of Independent Trade Unions of Montenegro
- Federation of Trade Unions of Macedonia
- Union of Autonomous Trade Unions of Croatia

== Affiliates ==
Union	Founded	Left	Reason left	Membership (1954)	Membership (1965)	Membership (1990)
Association of Barber and Wig Workers of Yugoslavia		1947	Merged	N/A	N/A	N/A
Association of Domestic Auxiliary Staff of Yugoslavia		1947	Merged	N/A	N/A	N/A
Association of Educators of Pre-School Institutions				735	N/A	N/A
Association of Teachers of Special Schools	1952	1959	Merged	639	N/A	N/A
Association of Teachers of Vocational Schools	1952	1959	Merged	4,485	N/A	N/A
Association of University Teachers	1952	1959	Merged	1,982	N/A	N/A
Catering and Tourism Workers' Union	1974	1990	SSJ dissolved	N/A	N/A	250,000
Chemistry and Non-Metallic Industry Workers' Union	1974	1990	SSJ dissolved	N/A	N/A	255,000
Commerce Workers' Union	1974	1990	SSJ dissolved	N/A	N/A	650,000
Communal Enterprise Workers' Union	1945	1955	Merged	N/A	N/A	N/A
Craft Workers' Union	1947	1955	Merged	N/A	N/A	N/A
Economic-Administrative and Technical Institutions Employees Union	1945	1946	Merged	N/A	N/A	N/A
Education, Science and Culture Workers' Union	1978	1990	SSJ dissolved	N/A	N/A	430,000
Energy Workers' Union		1990	SSJ dissolved	N/A	N/A	180,000
Federation of Artists and Sculptors				535	N/A	N/A
Federation of Associations of Pensioners				244,624	N/A	N/A
Federation of Journalists				2,000	N/A	N/A
Federation of Librarians				579	N/A	N/A
Federation of Museum Societies				300	N/A	N/A
Forestry and Wood Industry Workers' Union	1974	1990	SSJ dissolved	N/A	N/A	320,000
Health and Social Care Workers' Union	1974	1990	SSJ dissolved	N/A	N/A	421,000
Judicial and Administrative Institutions Employees Union of Yugoslavia	1945	1946	Merged	N/A	N/A	N/A
Metal Production and Manufacturing Workers' Union	1974	1990	SSJ dissolved	N/A	N/A	980,000
Printing, Newspaper, Publishing and Information Workers' Union	1974	1990	SSJ dissolved	N/A	N/A	130,000
Public Utilities and Handicraft Workers' Union	1974	1990	SSJ dissolved	N/A	N/A	300,000
State Administration and Finance Workers' Union	1978	1990	SSJ dissolved	N/A	N/A	520,000
State Administrative and Judicial Institutions Employees Union	1946	1949	Merged	N/A	N/A	N/A
Textile, Leather and Footwear Workers' Union	1974	1990	SSJ dissolved	N/A	N/A	480,000
Union of Administrative and Judicial Workers	1974	1978	Merged	N/A	N/A	N/A
Union of Agricultural, Food Processing and Tobacco Workers of Yugoslavia	1959	1990	SSJ dissolved	N/A	373,000	525,000
Union of Agricultural Workers and Employees	1945	1959	Merged	84,792	N/A	N/A
Union of Chemical Industry Workers	1945	1959	Merged	37,759	N/A	N/A
Union of Communal and Craft Workers	1955	1963	Merged	131,986	N/A	N/A
Union of Construction Workers of Yugoslavia	1945	1990	SSJ dissolved	155,410	387,000	680,000
Union of Cultural and Art Institution Workers	1951	1963	Merged	11,137	N/A	N/A
Union of Educational and Scientific Workers of Yugoslavia	1945	1963	Merged	48,394	N/A	N/A
Union of Financial Officials	1945	1949	Merged	N/A	N/A	N/A
Union of Food and Tobacco Workers	1945	1959	Merged	57,437	N/A	N/A
Union of Industrial and Mining Workers	1963	1974	Split	N/A	1,191,000	N/A
Union of Maritime Workers	1945	1959	Merged	9,591	N/A	N/A
Union of Metal Workers	1945	1963	Merged	149,436	N/A	N/A
Union of Metallurgical and Mining Workers	1955	1959	Merged	127,940	N/A	N/A
Union of Metallurgical Workers and Employees	1950	1955	Merged	N/A	N/A	N/A
Union of Mining, Metallurgical and Chemical Workers	1959	1963	Merged	N/A	N/A	N/A
Union of Mining Workers	1945	1955	Merged	N/A	N/A	N/A
Union of Monetary and Financial Workers	1974	1978	Merged	N/A	N/A	N/A
Union of Postal, Telegraph and Telephone Employees	1945	1959	Merged	21,432	N/A	N/A
Union of Print and Paper Workers	1945	1963	Merged	20,369	N/A	N/A
Union of Health Workers	1945	1963	Merged	62,435	N/A	N/A
Union of Public Service Workers	1963	1974	Split	N/A	516,000	N/A
Union of Railwaymen	1945	1959	Merged	112,186	N/A	N/A
Union of Service Workers	1963	1974	Split	N/A	499,000	N/A
Union of State Administration Employees	1949	1963	Merged	137,551	N/A	N/A
Union of Textile and Leather Workers	1955	1963	Merged	108,283	N/A	N/A
Union of Trade Workers	1945	1955	Merged	N/A	N/A	N/A
Union of Transport and Communications Workers of Yugoslavia	1959	1990	SSJ dissolved	N/A	306,000	520,000
Union of Transport Workers	1945	1959	Merged	42,076	N/A	N/A
Union of Wood Industry Workers	1945	1963	Merged	94,337	N/A	N/A
Union of Workers and Employees of the Catering and Tourism Economy	1945	1955	Merged	N/A	N/A	N/A
Union of Workers and Employees of the Leather Processing Industry	1945	1955	Merged	N/A	N/A	N/A
Union of Workers and Employees of the Textile and Clothing Industry	1945	1955	Merged	N/A	N/A	N/A
Union of Workers and Employees of the Tobacco Industry	1945	1948	Merged	N/A	N/A	N/A
Union of Workers and Employees of Utility Companies and Institutions	1945	1955	Merged	N/A	N/A	N/A
Union of Workers in Culture, Arts, Radio and Television	1974	1978	Merged	N/A	N/A	N/A
Union of Workers in Education and Science	1974	1978	Merged	N/A	N/A	N/A
Union of Workers in Trade, Catering and Tourism	1955	1963	Merged	132,916	N/A	N/A
