= Danica Milosavljević =

Serbian Partisan fighter (1925–2018)

Danica Dana Milosavljević Razić (15 August 1925 – 26 February 2018) was a Serbian anti-fascist combat fighter for the Partisan forces in Yugoslavia's National Liberation War. By the time the War ended, she had reached the rank of captain of the Yugoslav People's Army. Later, she was a socio-political worker of the Socialist Republic of Serbia and was named a people's hero of Yugoslavia.

== Biography ==
Danica was born on 15 August 1925 in the village of Bioska, on the Tara River, near Užice. She came from a poor farming family and was the oldest child in the family of Miloš Milosavljević. She had three other sisters — Draginja, Marija and Ema and a brother, Aleksandar, known as Lala. Her uncle Nikola Milosavljević, whose wife died young, was killed in the Battle of Cer, so Dani's father Miloš took over the care of his three nephews Dušan, Pavle and Miljko. Growing up in a large, poor family was difficult.

In 1936, she moved with her family to Užice, where as a high school student she joined the revolutionary youth movement. In 1941, she became a member of the Communist Youth League (SKOJ). Before the liberation of Užice, she worked in a youth group that collected aid for the partisans. According to one source, "She was able to walk down the main street carrying a basket in which fruit was stacked on top of bombs and ammunition."

=== Combatant ===
Her first role was as a nurse in October 1941, when she joined the Third Užice Company of the Užice Partisan Detachment stationed in positions around Višegrad. After the First Enemy Offensive, she retreated with the company to the Sandžak, and then to Bosnia, where on 21 December 1941, she was with the Fifth Šumadija Battalion of the First Proletarian Brigade. During the Third Enemy Offensive, in June 1942, her company was transferred to the Fourth Užice Battalion of the Second Proletarian Brigade.

She was known as a machine gunner and bomber and participated in battles during the campaign in the Bosnian Krajina. As an exemplary fighter, she was admitted to the Communist Party (KPJ) in November 1942. In the battles against the fascist Ustashi forces, near Livno, in December 1942, she was seriously wounded, shot in the hip, after which she was treated in a hospital in Glamoč. In the spring of 1943, she returned to her unit, and in May 1943, during the introduction of ranks in the NOVJ, she was among the first women in the brigade to receive the rank of second lieutenant and became "the first female commander of a partisan formation."

During the War, she served as a corporal in the Second Company of the First Battalion and as a youth leader of the First Battalion of the Second Proletarian Brigade, with which, after the Battle of Sutjeska, she participated in battles in eastern Bosnia, Montenegro, Sandžak and Serbia, as well as the Belgrade Operation and the Srem Front. Her unit in the Yugoslav Army was demobilized in 1946.

=== Post World War II ===
After the war, she married the journalist Borivoj Razić.

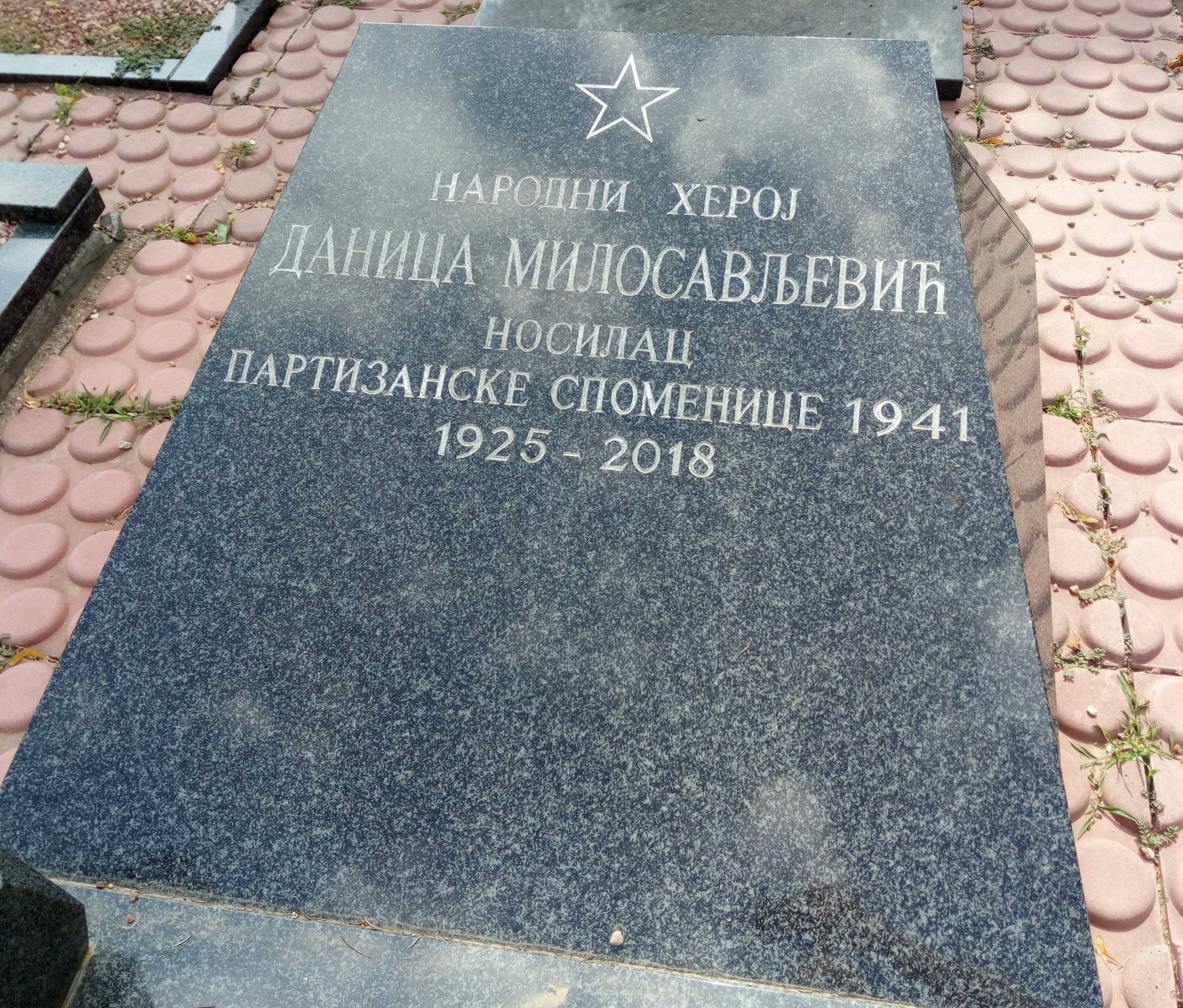
Gravesite of Danica Milosavljevic in the Alley of National Heroes.

She became active in socio-political organizations, such as the Union of Veterans' Associations (SUBNOR), the Socialist Union of Working People (SSRN), and the Conference for Social Activity of Women, to name a few.

For her services during the War, she received the Partisan Memorial of 1941 and many other decorations, including the Order of the People's Hero in 1953.

She served as a member of the Commission on Statutory Questions of the 11th Congress of the League of Communists of Yugoslavia.

She died in Belgrade on 26 February 2018, and her ashes were buried in the Alley of National Heroes at the New Cemetery.
