= 1950 Yugoslavian parliamentary election =

← 1945	26 March 1950	1953 →

All seats in the Federal Council All seats in the Council of Peoples
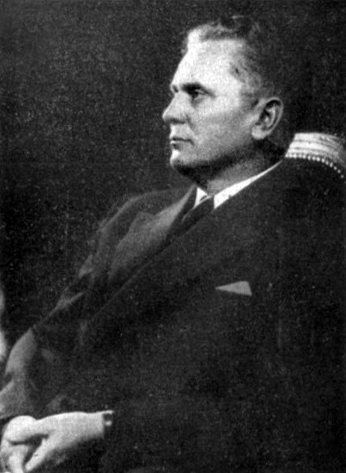
	First party
Leader	Josip Broz Tito
Party	KPJ
Alliance	People's Front
Percentage	100%
Prime Minister before election
Josip Broz Tito
KPJ
Prime Minister after election
Josip Broz Tito
KPJ

Parliamentary elections were held in Yugoslavia on 26 March 1950. They were the first held since the onset of communist rule five years earlier. The Communist Party of Yugoslavia had won the 1945 elections after an opposition boycott; soon afterward, the Communists abolished the monarchy and declared Yugoslavia a people's republic. By this time, the People's Front, dominated by the Communist Party, was effectively the only legally permitted political organisation in the country, and as such was the only organisation to contest the election.

== Background ==
A new electoral law was passed in January 1950. Imro Filacović of the Croatian Peasant Party was the only MP to vote against the law, complaining that it did not allow opposition parties to oversee the vote counting process. As a result, he was jeered in the National Assembly.

The new law allowed individual candidacies in elections to the National Assembly, replacing the previous closed list system, although the closed list system remained in place for the Council of Nationalities. Candidates required the signatures of 100 registered voters in order to be able to run for office. However, by this time, the ruling People's Front no longer tolerated opposition parties. As a result, voters only had the option of approving or rejecting a single People's Front candidate in each constituency. Communist Party leader and Prime Minister Josip Broz Tito claimed that any alternative programme would be hostile to socialism, and "this, naturally, we cannot allow".

Despite the absence of opposition candidates, voting was secret. Voters cast their ballots using rubber balls, and were required to place their hands in both ballot boxes to ensure secrecy.

== Results ==
=== Federal Council ===
Party	Votes	%
People's Front of Yugoslavia	8,449,839	100.00
Total	8,449,839	100.00
Valid votes	8,449,839	93.25
Invalid/blank votes	611,941	6.75
Total votes	9,061,780	100.00
Registered voters/turnout	9,856,501	91.94
Source: Sternberger et al.
