= Commission on Statutory Questions of the 12th Congress of the League of Communists of Yugoslavia =

12th Commission on Statutory Questions
- Emblem of the League of Communists of Yugoslavia

29 June 1982 – 25 June 1986 (3 years, 361 days) Overview
- Type: Statutory organ
- Election: 12th Congress

Members
- Total: 24 members
- Newcomers: 21 members (12th)
- Old: 3 member (11th)
- Reelected: 1 members (13th)

This electoral term of the Commission on Statutory Questions was elected by the 12th Congress of the League of Communists of Yugoslavia in 1982, and was in session until the convocation of the 13th Congress in 1986.

== Composition ==
=== Members ===
Members of the Commission on Statutory Questions of the 12th Congress of the League of Communists of Yugoslavia
Name	11th	13th	Birth	PM	Death	Branch	Nationality	Gender	Ref.
Stipo Bilan	New	Not	1922	1939	?	Bosnia-Herzegovina	Croat	Male	
Slavko Filipi	New	Not	1923	1943	?	Croatia	Croat	Male	
Rahmija Kadenić	New	Not	1920	1939	2000	Bosnia-Herzegovina	Muslim	Male	
Marko Krža	New	Not	1930	1948	?	Serbia	Serb	Male	
Vujo Lukić	New	Not	1926	1943	1983	Yugoslav People's Army	Serb	Male	
Miličko Lutovac	New	Not	1925	1944	?	Montenegro	Yugoslav	Male	
Kamenko Marković	Old	Not	1928	1947	?	Croatia	Serb	Male	
Agim Miftari	New	Not	1944	1969	?	Macedonia	Yugoslav	Male	
Ali Mulja	New	Not	1925	1945	?	Kosovo	Albanian	Male	
Ilja Pavlović	New	Not	1937	1955	?	Montenegro	Montenegrin	Male	
Gojko Sekulovski	New	Not	1925	1944	2002	Macedonia	Macedonian	Male	
Slavko Soršak	Old	Not	1931	1949	2018	Slovenia	Slovene	Male	
Rudi Sova	New	Not	1934	1959	?	Vojvodina	Croat	Male	
Ivanka Vrhovčak	New	Not	1933	1954	?	Slovenia	Slovene	Female	
Budimir Vukašinović	New	Not	1921	1944	1989	Serbia	Serb	Male	

=== Ex-officio ===
Ex-Officio Members of the Commission on Statutory Questions of the 12th Congress of the League of Communists of Yugoslavia
Name	11th	13th	Birth	PM	Death	Branch	Nationality	Ref.
Boro Drmončić	New	Not	1920	1942	?	Kosovo	Serb	
Milan Fabjančič	Old	Elected	1935	1955	?	Slovenia	Slovene	
Velimir Matić	Old	Not	1924	1944	?	Serbia	Serb	
Radovan Međedović	New	Not	1933	1955	?	Vojvodina	Serb	
Danilo Mićunović	New	Not	1922	1944	?	Montenegro	Montenegrin	
Kiko Novkovski	New	Not	1923	1944	?	Macedonia	Macedonian	
Ilija Perišić	New	Not	1926	1944	2010	Yugoslav People's Army	Serb	
Mato Salinović	New	Not	1926	1947	1988	Bosnia and Herzegovina	Croat	
Vasilije Skendzić	New	Not	1921	1941	2001	Croatia	Serb	

== Bibliography ==
=== Books ===
- Rajović, Radošin (1970). Jugoslovenski savremenici: Ko je ko u Jugoslaviji [Yugoslav Contemporaries: Who's Who in Yugoslavia] (in Serbo-Croatian). Hronometar.
- Miller, Robert F. (1982). "The 12th Congress of the League of Communists of Yugoslavia: The Succession Process Continues". Australian Outlook. 36 (3). doi:10.1515/soeu-1982-317-805.

=== Newspapers ===
- Staff writer (30 June 1982). "Централни комитет Савеза комуниста Југославије" [Central Committee of the League of Communists of Yugoslavia]. Borba (in Serbo-Croatian). Socialist Alliance of Working People: 6–7. Archived from the original on 14 January 2025.
- Staff writer (24 June 1978). "Комисија за статутарна питања Савеза комуниста Југославије" [Commission on Statutory Questions of the League of Communists of Yugoslavia]. Borba (in Serbo-Croatian). Socialist Alliance of Working People: 9. Archived from the original on 14 January 2025.
