= Control Commission of the 8th Congress of the League of Communists of Yugoslavia =

8th Control Commission
- Emblem of the League of Communists of Yugoslavia

13 December 1964 – 11 March 1969 (4 years, 88 days) Overview
- Type: Control organ
- Election: 8th Congress

Members
- Total: 25 members
- Newcomers: 25 members (11th)
- Reelected: 2 (9th)

This electoral term of the Commission on Statutory Questions was elected by the 8th Congress of the League of Communists of Yugoslavia in 1964, and was in session until the convocation of the 9th Congress in 1969.

== Composition ==
Members of the Control Commission of the 8th Congress of the League of Communists of Yugoslavia
| Name | 7th | 9th | Birth | PM | Death | Branch | Nationality | Gender | Ref. |
|---|---|---|---|---|---|---|---|---|---|
| Vera Aceva | New | Not | 1919 | 1940 | 2006 | Macedonia | Macedonian | Male | |
| Savo Brković | New | Not | 1906 | 1924 | 1991 | Montenegro | Montenegrin | Male | |
| Stjepan Ivić | New | Not | 1914 | 1941 | 1988 | Croatia | Croat | Male | |
| Stevo Jakovina | New | Not | 1932 | 1950 | ? | Croatia | Croat | Male | |
| Vlado Janić | New | Not | 1904 | 1931 | 1991 | Croatia | Croat | Male | |
| Kazimir Jelovica | New | Not | 1922 | 1942 | ? | Croatia | Croat | Male | |
| Branislav Joksović | New | Not | 1920 | 1941 | 1986 | Serbia | Serb | Male | |
| Hajrudin Kapetanovic | New | Not | 1917 | 1940 | 1988 | Bosnia-Herzegovina | Muslim | Male | |
| Anto Kljujić | New | Not | 1932 | 1951 | ? | Bosnia-Herzegovina | Croat | Male | |
| Iljaz Kurteši | New | Not | 1927 | 1949 | 2016 | Kosovo | Albanian | Male | |
| Đorđe Lazić | New | Not | 1927 | 1945 | 2018 | Serbia | Serb | Male | |
| Stane Markič | New | Not | 1928 | 1945 | 2013 | Slovenia | Slovene | Male | |
| Andrija Mugoša | New | Not | 1912 | 1933 | 2006 | Montenegro | Montenegrin | Male | |
| Grujo Novaković | New | Elected | 1913 | 1936 | 1975 | Bosnia-Herzegovina | Serb | Male | |
| Mirko Popovic | New | Not | 1923 | 1941 | 1986 | Serbia | Serb | Male | |
| Jelica Radojčevič | New | Not | 1922 | 1943 | ? | Croatia | Serb | Female | |
| Paško Romac | New | Not | 1916 | 1937 | 1982 | Serbia | Yugoslav | Male | |
| Janko Rudolf | New | Elected | 1914 | 1941 | 1997 | Slovenia | Slovene | Male | |
| Ida Sabo | New | Not | 1915 | 1939 | 2016 | Serbia | Serb | Female | |
| Janez Strniša | New | Not | 1932 | 1951 | ? | Slovenia | Slovene | Male | |
| Camuran Tahir | New | Not | 1925 | 1944 | ? | Macedonia | Macedonian | Male | |
| Vojo Todorovic | New | Not | 1914 | 1934 | 1990 | Bosnia-Herzegovina | Jew | Male | |
| Ilija Topalovski | New | Not | 1922 | 1940 | 1999 | Macedonia | Macedonian | Male | |
| Olga Vrabič | New | Not | 1916 | 1936 | 2001 | Slovenia | Slovene | Female | |
| Živko Žižić | New | Not | 1914 | 1938 | 1976 | Montenegro | Montenegrin | Male | |

== Bibliography ==
=== Books ===
- Rajović, Radošin (1970). Jugoslovenski savremenici: Ko je ko u Jugoslaviji [Yugoslav Contemporaries: Who's Who in Yugoslavia] (in Serbo-Croatian). Hronometar.
- Staff writer, ed. (1965). VIII Kongres Saveza Komunista Jugoslavije Beograd, 7–13. decembra 1964.: stenog̈rafske beleške [VIII Congress of the Union of Communists of Yugoslavia Belgrade, 7–13 December 1964: shorthand notes] (in Serbo-Croatian). Vol. 3. Kultura.
- Stroynowski, Juliusz, ed. (1989b). Who's Who in the Socialist Countries of Europe: I–O. K. G. Saur Verlag. ISBN 3-598-10719-6.

=== Newspapers ===
- Staff writer (24 June 1978). "Комисија за статутарна питања Савеза комуниста Југославије" [Commission on Statutory Questions of the League of Communists of Yugoslavia]. Borba (in Serbo-Croatian). Socialist Alliance of Working People: 9. Archived from the original on 14 January 2025.
