= Unitary National Liberation Front =

Yugoslavian political organization

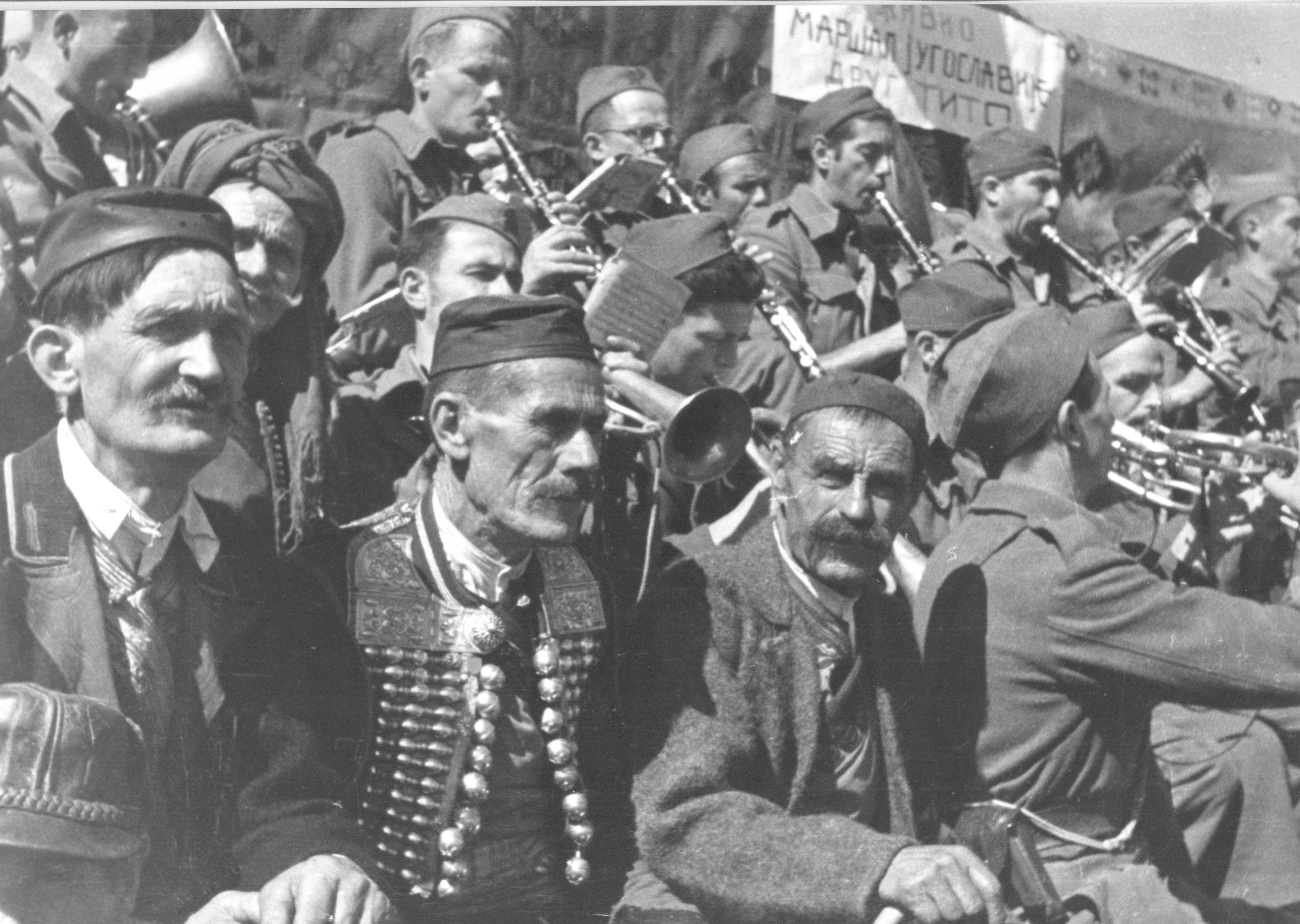
JNOF Conference for Herzegovina in Gacko, September 19, 1944

The Unitary National Liberation Front (Serbo-Croatian: Јединствени народноослободилачки фронт, Jedinstveni narodnooslobodilački front, ЈНОФ, JNOF) or simply the National Liberation Front (sometimes referred to as the People's Liberation Front), was a World War II political organization and anti-fascism movement during World War II in Yugoslavia.

It was headed by the Communist Party of Yugoslavia (KPJ), and united all political parties and individuals of the republican, federalist, and left-wing political spectrum in the occupied Kingdom of Yugoslavia.

The Front served as political backing to the Yugoslav Resistance movement, known as the Yugoslav Partisans.

In 1945, with the Partisans winning the war, the Unitary People's Liberation Front was reorganized and renamed the People's Front of Yugoslavia (Narodni Front, NOF). Under this name, the front won the postwar Yugoslav elections (as the sole participant), after which it was soon renamed the Socialist Alliance of Working People of Yugoslavia (Socijalistički savez radnog naroda Jugoslavije, SSRNJ).

== See also ==
- Anti-fascism in Yugoslavia
- Yugoslavia in World War II
