= Union of Health Workers =

The Union of Health Workers (Serbo-Croatian: Sindikat zdravstvenih radnika was a trade union representing workers in the healthcare sector in Yugoslavia.

The union was founded in April 1945, and affiliated to the Confederation of Trade Unions of Yugoslavia. By 1955, it claimed 62,435 members, and was led by Stevan Jovanovic.

In 1963, it merged with the Union of State Administration Employees, the Union of Educational and Scientific Workers, the Union of Cultural and Artistic Institutions and the Federation of Trade Unions of Civil Servants and Public Service Workers, to form the Union of Public Service Workers.
