= Confederation of Independent Trade Unions =

Confederation of Independent Trade Unions may refer to:

- European Confederation of Independent Trade Unions, a regional trade union federation in Europe
- Confederation of Independent Trade Unions of Bosnia and Herzegovina, a national trade union federation in Bosnia and Herzegovina
- Confederation of Independent Trade Unions of Bulgaria, a national trade union federation in Bulgaria
- Confederation of Independent Trade Unions of Luxembourg, a national trade union federation in Luxembourg
