= Commission on Statutory Questions of the 11th Congress of the League of Communists of Yugoslavia =

11th Commission on Statutory Questions
- Emblem of the League of Communists of Yugoslavia

23 June 1978 – 26 June 1982 (4 years, 3 days) Overview
- Type: Statutory organ
- Election: 11th Congress

Members
- Total: 24 members
- Newcomers: 23 members (11th)
- Old: 3 members (11th)
- Reelected: None (13th)

This electoral term of the Commission on Statutory Questions was elected by the 11th Congress of the League of Communists of Yugoslavia in 1978, and was in session until the convocation of the 12th Congress in 1982.

== Composition ==
=== Members ===
Members of the Commission on Statutory Questions of the 11th Congress of the League of Communists of Yugoslavia
Name	10th	12th	Birth	PM	Death	Branch	Nationality	Gender	Ref.
Dimitar Aleksievski	New	Not	1920	1941	?	Macedonia	Macedonian	Male	
Milan Fabjančič	New	Not	1935	1955	?	Slovenia	Slovene	Male	
Branko Gajović	New	Not	1929	1948	?	Montenegro	Montenegrin	Male	
Anica Gradišar	New	Not	1929	1950	?	Croatia	Croat	Female	
Peter Hedžet	New	Not	1940	1959	?	Slovenia	Slovene	Male	
Mulo Hodžić	New	Not	1939	1963	?	Bosnia-Herzegovina	Muslim	Male	
Jovan Krmpotić	New	Not	1927	1944	?	Vojvodina	Serb	Male	
Velimir Matić	New	Not	1924	1944	?	Serbia	Serb	Male	
Danica Milosavljević	New	Not	1925	1942	2018	Serbia	Serb	Female	
Rizo Muković	New	Not	1931	1950	?	Montenegro	Muslim	Male	
Đore Pečijareski	New	Not	1923	1942	?	Macedonia	Macedonian	Male	
Gojko Škrbić	Old	Not	1923	1942	1985	Bosnia-Herzegovina	Serb	Male	
Sait Zatrići	New	Not	1918	1942	?	Kosovo	Albanian	Male	
Borislav Žikić	New	Not	1928	1945	?	Yugoslav People's Army	Serb	Male	
Rade Zrenjanin	New	Not	1920	1941	?	Croatia	Serb	Male	

=== Ex-officio ===
Ex-Officio Members of the Commission on Statutory Questions of the 11th Congress of the League of Communists of Yugoslavia
Name	10th	12th	Birth	PM	Death	Branch	Nationality	Gender	Ref.
Uroš Anđelić	Old	Not	1919	1944	?	Bosnia-Herzegovina	Serb	Male	
Musa Baljeci	Old	Not	1929	1947	?	Kosovo	Albanian	Male	
Pavle Branković	New	Not	1921	1948	?	Serbia	Serb	Male	
Milan Krdžić	New	Not	1922	1941	?	Yugoslav People's Army	Serb	Male	
Kamenko Marković	New	Not	1928	1947	?	Croatia	Croat	Male	
Momčilo Mitrov	New	Not	1926	1944	?	Macedonia	Macedonian	Male	
Vladimir Sekulić	New	Not	1932	1947	?	Montenegro	Montenegrin	Male	
Slavko Soršak	New	Not	1931	1949	2018	Slovenia	Slovene	Male	
Slavko Veselinov	New	Not	1925	1944	1997	Vojvodina	Serb	Male	

== Bibliography ==
=== Books ===
- Opačić, Nine (1968). Društveno-političke zajednice: Socijalističke republike i autonomme pokrajine [Socio-Political Communities: Socialist Republics and Autonomous Provinces] (in Serbo-Croatian). Međunarodna štampa-Interpress.
- Rajović, Radošin (1970). Jugoslovenski savremenici: Ko je ko u Jugoslaviji [Yugoslav Contemporaries: Who's Who in Yugoslavia] (in Serbo-Croatian). Hronometar.

=== Newspapers ===
- Staff writer (30 June 1982). "Централни комитет Савеза комуниста Југославије" [Central Committee of the League of Communists of Yugoslavia]. Borba (in Serbo-Croatian). Socialist Alliance of Working People: 6–7. Archived from the original on 14 January 2025.
- Staff writer (24 June 1978). "Комисија за статутарна питања Савеза комуниста Југославије" [Commission on Statutory Questions of the League of Communists of Yugoslavia]. Borba (in Serbo-Croatian). Socialist Alliance of Working People: 9. Archived from the original on 14 January 2025.
