= Union of Food and Tobacco Workers =

The Union of Food and Tobacco Workers (Serbo-Croatian: Sindikat radnika i službenika prehrambene i duhanske industrije) was a trade union representing workers in the food and tobacco processing sectors in Yugoslavia.

The union was founded in April 1945 and affiliated to the Confederation of Trade Unions of Yugoslavia. Initially, it only represented food workers, but in 1948, it absorbed the smaller Union of Workers and Employees of the Tobacco Industry. By 1954, it claimed 57,437 members, and was led by Mladen Bogosavljević. In 1959, it merged with the Union of Agricultural Workers and Employees, to form the Union of Agricultural, Food Processing and Tobacco Workers of Yugoslavia.
