= Commission on Statutory Questions of the 9th Congress of the League of Communists of Yugoslavia =

9th Commission on Statutory Questions
- Emblem of the League of Communists of Yugoslavia

13 December 1964 – 11 March 1969 (4 years, 88 days) Overview
- Type: Statutory organ
- Election: 9th Congress

Members
- Total: 19 members
- Newcomers: 22 members (12th)
- Old: 2 member (8th)
- Reelected: 3 members (10th)

This electoral term of the Commission on Statutory Questions was elected by the 12th Congress of the League of Communists of Yugoslavia in 1982, and was in session until the convocation of the 13th Congress in 1986.

== Composition ==
=== Members ===
Members of the Commission on Statutory Questions of the 9th Congress of the League of Communists of Yugoslavia
Name	8th	10th	Birth	PM	Death	Branch	Nationality	Gender	Ref.
Metodi Antov	New	Not	1924	1943	?	Macedonia	Macedonian	Male	
Ljupčo Arnaudovski	New	Not	1931	1949	?	Macedonia	Macedonian	Male	
Radoslav Berginc	New	Not	1934	1958	?	Slovenia	Slovene	Male	
Stjepan Jureković	New	Not	1921	1940	?	Croatia	Croat	Male	
Radisav Nedeljković	New	Not	1918	1936	?	Serbia	Serb	Male	
Đura Njemoga	New	Not	1929	1949	?	Vojvodina	Serb	Male	
Grujo Novaković	Old	Not	1913	1936	1975	Bosnia-Herzegovina	Serb	Male	
Mario Rojnić	New	Not	1938	1957	1985	Croatia	Croat	Male	
Šerafedin Sulejman	New	Not	1929	1946	2018	Kosovo	Albanian	Male	
Jovanka Soldatić	New	Not	1920	1949	?	Serbia	Serb	Female	
Dedo Trampić	New	Not	1922	1941	2017	Bosnia-Herzegovina	Muslim	Male	
Vladimir Zupančić	New	Elected	1932	1948	?	Slovenia	Slovene	Male	

=== Ex-officio ===
Ex-Officio Members of the Commission on Statutory Questions of the 9th Congress of the League of Communists of Yugoslavia
Name	8th	10th	Birth	PM	Death	Branch	Nationality	Gender	Ref.
Antun Biber	New	Not	1910	1939	1995	Croatia	Croat	Male	
Salim Ćerić	New	Not	1918	1941	1987	Bosnia-Herzegovina	Muslim	Male	
Predrag-Dragan Gligorić	New	Elected	1922	1942	?	Serbia	Serb	Male	
Milovan Golubović	New	Not	1923	1942	?	Montenegro	Montenegrin	Male	
Mladen Marin	New	Elected	1920	1941	1987	Yugoslav People's Army	Serb	Male	
Janko Rudolf	Old	Not	1914	1941	1997	Slovenia	Slovene	Male	
Metodi Zvrcinov	New	Not	1929	?	?	Macedonia	Macedonian	Male	

== Bibliography ==
=== Books and journals ===
- Janković, Slavko, ed. (1957). Ko je ko u Jugoslaviji: biografski podaci o jugoslovenskim savremenicima [Who's Who in Yugoslavia: Biographical Information About Yugoslav Contemporaries] (in Serbo-Croatian). Vol. 3. Izd. "Sedme sile".
- Marković, Dragan; Kržavac, Savo (1985). Zašto su smenjivani [Why Were They Replaced?] (in Serbo-Croatian). Partizanska knj.
- Martinović, Savo (1970). Deveti kongres Saveza komunista Jugoslavije, Beograd, 11-13. III.1969 [Ninth Congress of the League of Communists of Yugoslavia, Belgrade, 11-13. III.1969] (in Serbo-Croatian). League of Communists of Yugoslavia.
- Miller, Robert F. (1982). "The 12th Congress of the League of Communists of Yugoslavia: The Succession Process Continues". Australian Outlook. 36 (3). doi:10.1515/soeu-1982-317-805.
- Rajović, Radošin (1970). Jugoslovenski savremenici: Ko je ko u Jugoslaviji [Yugoslav Contemporaries: Who's Who in Yugoslavia] (in Serbo-Croatian). Hronometar.

=== Newspapers ===
- Staff writer (21 October 1985). "Умро је Марио Ројнић" [Mario Rojnić has died]. Borba (in Serbo-Croatian). Socialist Alliance of Working People: 3.
- Staff writer (27 November 1968). "најдемократскији избор кандидата" [The most democratic choice of candidate]. Borba (in Serbo-Croatian). Socialist Alliance of Working People: 5.

=== Websites ===
- Staff writer (31 January 2018). "Šerafedin Suleiman" [Šerafedin Sulejman] (in Albanian). Oral History of Kosovo. Archived from the original on 9 August 2024.
