= Health and Social Care Workers' Union =

Yugoslav trade union

The Health and Social Care Workers' Union (Serbo-Croatian: Sindikat radnika delatnosti zdravstva i socijalne zaštite) was a trade union which represented workers in two related industries, in Yugoslavia.

The union was founded in 1974, when the Union of Public Service Workers was split up. Like its predecessor, it affiliated to the Confederation of Trade Unions of Yugoslavia. By 1990, it had grown to 421,000 members and was led by Ljiljana Milošević. That year, it split into various more localised unions, including the Independent Trade Union of Workers in Health, Pension and Disability Insurance and Social Protection in Croatia.
