= Union of Construction Workers of Yugoslavia =

The Union of Construction Workers of Yugoslavia (Serbo-Croatian: Sindikat građevinskih radnika Jugoslavije) was a trade union representing workers in the construction industry in Yugoslavia.

The union was founded in 1945, soon becoming the Union of the Construction Industry and Building Workers of Yugoslavia, and it affiliated to the Confederation of Trade Unions of Yugoslavia. By 1954, it had 155,410 members, growing to 387,000 by 1965. In 1960, the union was renamed as the "Union of Construction Workers of Yugoslavia", but it returned to its earlier name in 1982.

The union split in 1990, into unions including the Independent Trade Union of Croatian Builders.
