= Union of Mining, Metallurgical and Chemical Workers =

Trade Union in Yugoslavia

The Union of Mining, Metallurgical and Chemical Workers (Serbo-Croatian: Sindikat radnika rudarstva, metalurgije i kemijske industrije) was a trade union representing workers in various related industries in Yugoslavia.

The union was founded on 18 April 1959, when the Union of Metallurgical and Mining Workers merged with the Union of Chemical Industry Workers. Like all its predecessors, it affiliated to the Confederation of Trade Unions of Yugoslavia. On formation, it had 239,826 members, and was led by Stevo Bevandic.

In 1963, it merged with the Union of Metal Workers, the Union of Printing Workers, the Union of Textile and Leather Workers, and the Union of Wood Industry Workers, to form the Union of Industrial and Mining Workers.
