= Union of Metal Workers =

The Union of Metal Workers (Serbo-Croatian: Sindikat metalskih radnika) was a trade union representing workers in the metal industry in Yugoslavia.

The union was established in April 1945 and affiliated to the Confederation of Trade Unions of Yugoslavia. By 1954, it claimed 149,436 members, and was led by Norbert Veber.

In 1963, it merged with the Union of Mining, Metallurgical and Chemical Workers, the Union of Printing Workers, the Union of Textile and Leather Workers, and the Union of Wood Industry Workers, to form the Union of Industrial and Mining Workers.
