= Forestry and Wood Industry Workers' Union =

The Forestry and Wood Industry Workers' Union (Serbo-Croatian: Sindikat radnika industrijske prerade drva i šumarstva) was a trade union which represented workers in two related industries, in Yugoslavia.

The union was founded in 1974, when the Union of Industrial and Mining Workers was split up. Like its predecessor, it affiliated to the Confederation of Trade Unions of Yugoslavia. By 1990, it had grown to 320,000 members and was led by Dragoljub Obradovic. That year, it split into various more localised unions, including the Independent Trade Union of Forestry of Croatia and the Independent Trade Union of the Wood and Paper Industry of Croatia.
