= Printing, Newspaper, Publishing and Information Workers' Union =

The Printing, Newspaper, Publishing and Information Workers' Union (Serbo-Croatian: Sindikata radnika grafičke, novinsko-izdavačke i informativne delatnosti) was a trade union representing workers in printing and related industries in Yugoslavia.

The union was founded in 1974, when the Union of Industrial and Mining Workers was split up. Like its predecessor, it affiliated to the Confederation of Trade Unions of Yugoslavia. By 1990, it had grown to 130,000 members and was led by Boris Bišćan. That year, it split into various more localised unions.
