= Chemistry and Non-Metallic Industry Workers' Union =

Trade union in Yugoslavia

The Chemistry and Non-Metallic Industry Workers' Union (Serbo-Croatian: Sindikat radnika hemije i nemetala) was a trade union representing workers in various industries in Yugoslavia.

The union was founded in 1974, when the Union of Industrial and Mining Workers was split up. Like its predecessor, it affiliated to the Confederation of Trade Unions of Yugoslavia. By 1990, it had grown to 255,000 members and was led by Stojmir Domazetovski. That year, it split into various more localised unions.
