= Commerce Workers' Union =

Trade union in Yugoslavia

The Commerce Workers' Union (Serbo-Croatian: Sindikat radnika u trgovini) was a trade union representing workers in the commerce sector in Yugoslavia.

The union was founded in 1974, when the Union of Service Workers was split up. Like its predecessor, it affiliated to the Confederation of Trade Unions of Yugoslavia. By 1990, it had grown to 650,000 members and was led by Ljubica Bračko. That year, it split into various more localised unions, including the Commerce Union of Croatia.
