= Union of State Administration Employees =

The Union of State Administration Employees (Serbo-Croatian: Sindikat službenika državnih ustanova Jugoslavije) was a trade union representing civil servants in Yugoslavia.

The union was founded in 1949, when the State Administrative and Judicial Institutions Employees Union merged with the Union of Financial Officials.Like both its predecessors, it affiliated to the Confederation of Trade Unions of Yugoslavia. By 1954, it claimed 137,551 members, and was led by Marjan Vivoda.

In 1963, the union merged with Union of Health Workers, the Union of Educational and Scientific Workers, the Union of Cultural and Artistic Institutions, and the Federation of Trade Unions of Civil Servants and Public Service Workers, to form the Union of Public Service Workers.
