= Union of Railwaymen =

The Union of Railwaymen (Serbo-Croatian: Sindikat željezničara was a trade union representing railway workers in Yugoslavia.

The union was founded in 1945, as the Union of Railway and Transport Workers, and it affiliated to the Confederation of Trade Unions of Yugoslavia. It never represented road transport workers, and so in 1955 it was renamed as the "Union of Railwaymen". In 1955, it claimed 112,186 members, and was led by Rade Vučković.

In 1959, it merged with the Union of Maritime Workers, the Union of Postal, Telegraph and Telephone Employees, and the Union of Transport Workers, to form the Union of Transport and Communications Workers of Yugoslavia.
