= Metal Production and Manufacturing Workers' Union =

Workers union in Yugoslavia

The Metal Production and Manufacturing Workers' Union (Serbo-Croatian: Sindikat radnika proizvodnje i prerade metala) was a trade union representing workers in the metal industry in Yugoslavia.

The union was founded in 1974, when the Union of Industrial and Mining Workers was split up. Like its predecessor, it affiliated to the Confederation of Trade Unions of Yugoslavia. By 1990, it had grown to 980,000 members and was led by Slavko Uršič. That year, it split into various more localised unions, including the Independent Trade Union of Croatian Metal Production and Processing Workers.
