= 1967 Yugoslavian parliamentary election =

Partial parliamentary elections were held in Yugoslavia on 23 April 1967 to elect half of the 120 seats in the Federal Council.

== Campaign ==
Fifteen of the 60 seats were contested by at least two candidates.

== Results ==
For the first time, several official People's Front candidates were defeated.

| Party | Votes | % | Seats |
|---|---|---|---|
| People's Front of Yugoslavia | 5,302,267 | 100.00 | 60 |
| Total | 5,302,267 | 100.00 | 60 |
| Valid votes | 5,302,267 | 94.58 | |
| Invalid/blank votes | 304,106 | 5.42 | |
| Total votes | 5,606,373 | 100.00 | |
| Registered voters/turnout | 6,238,296 | 89.87 | |
Source: Sternberger et al
