= Education, Science and Culture Workers' Union =

Trade union in Yugoslavia

The Education, Science and Culture Workers' Union (Serbo-Croatian: Sindikat radnika u odgoju, obrazovanju, znanosti i kulturi) was a trade union representing workers in education, research and entertainment in Yugoslavia.

The union was founded in 1978, when the Union of Workers in Education and Science merged with the Union of Workers in Culture, Arts, Radio and Television. Like both its predecessors, it affiliated to the Confederation of Trade Unions of Yugoslavia. By 1990, it had grown to 430,000 members and was led by Boris Lipužić. That year, it split into various more localised unions, including the Independent Trade Union of Preschool Education Workers of Croatia, the Independent Trade Union of Croatian Primary Education Employees, the Independent Trade Union of Croatian Secondary Schools, the Independent Trade Union of Croatian Science and Higher Education and the Independent Trade Union of Croatian Cultural Employees.
