= Union of Industrial and Mining Workers =

The Union of Industrial and Mining Workers (Serbo-Croatian: Sindikat radnika industrije i rudarstva) was a trade union representing workers in various industries in Yugoslavia.

The union was established in 1963, when the Union of Metal Workers merged with the Union of Mining, Metallurgical and Chemical Workers, the Union of Printing Workers, the Union of Textile and Leather Workers, and the Union of Wood Industry Workers. Like all its predecessors, it affiliated to the Confederation of Trade Unions of Yugoslavia. By 1965, it claimed 1,191,000 members, and was led by Aleksandar Orlandić.

In 1974, the union was split into the Metal Production and Manufacturing Workers' Union, the Chemistry and Non-Metallic Industry Workers' Union, the Textile, Leather and Footwear Workers' Union, the Forestry and Wood Industry Workers' Union and the Printing, Newspaper, Publishing and Information Workers' Union.
