= Public Utilities and Handicraft Workers' Union =

The Public Utilities and Handicraft Workers' Union (Serbo-Croatian: Sindikat radnika u komunalnoj privredi i zanatstvu) was a trade union which represented workers in two distinct sectors, in Yugoslavia.

The union was founded in 1974, when the Union of Service Workers was split up. Like its predecessor, it affiliated to the Confederation of Trade Unions of Yugoslavia. By 1990, it had grown to 300,000 members and was led by Josip Kolar. That year, it split into various more localised unions, including the Independent Trade Union of Communal and Housing Workers of Croatia.
