= State Administration and Finance Workers' Union =

Trade union in Yugoslavia

The State Administration and Finance Workers' Union (Serbo-Croatian: Sindikat radnika državne uprave i finansijskih organa) was a trade union representing civil servants and workers in the finance sector, in Yugoslavia.

The union was founded in 1978, when the Union of Administrative and Judicial Workers merged with the Union of Monetary and Financial Workers. Like both its predecessors, it affiliated to the Confederation of Trade Unions of Yugoslavia. By 1990, it had grown to 520,000 members and was led by Ram Bućaj. That year, it split into various more localised unions, including the Croatian Administration and Judiciary Union, and the Independent Trade Union of Croatian Banks.
