= Union of Service Workers =

The Union of Service Workers (Serbo-Croatian: Sindikat radnika uslužnih djelatnosti) was a trade union representing hospitality workers, municipal workers, and workers in local industries, in Yugoslavia.

The union was established in 1963, when the Union of Communal and Craft Workers merged with the Union of Workers in Trade, Catering and Tourism. Like both its predecessors, it affiliated to the Confederation of Trade Unions of Yugoslavia. By 1965, it claimed 499,000 members.

In 1974, the union was split into the Commerce Workers' Union, the Union of Craftworkers, the Catering and Tourism Workers' Union and the Public Utilities and Handicraft Workers' Union.
