= Union of Metallurgical and Mining Workers =

Trade union in Yugoslavia

The Union of Metallurgical and Mining Workers (Serbo-Croatian: Sindikat rudarskih i metalurgijskih radnika) was a trade union representing workers in two related industries in Yugoslavia.

The union was founded in 1955, when the Union of Metallurgical Workers and Employees merged with the Union of Mining Workers. Like both its predecessors, it affiliated to the Confederation of Trade Unions of Yugoslavia. On formation, it had 127,940 members, and was led by Nikola Kotle.

On 18 April 1959, it merged with the Union of Chemical Industry Workers, to form the Union of Mining, Metallurgical and Chemical Workers.
