= Textile, Leather and Footwear Workers' Union =

The Textile, Leather and Footwear Workers' Union (Serbo-Croatian: Sindikat radnika industrije tekstila, kože i obuće) was a trade union representing workers in several related industries in Yugoslavia.

The union was founded in 1974, when the Union of Industrial and Mining Workers was split up. Like its predecessor, it affiliated to the Confederation of Trade Unions of Yugoslavia. By 1990, it had grown to 480,000 members and was led by Jozefina Musa. That year, it split into various more localised unions, including the Union of Textile, Leather, Rubber and Footwear Workers of Croatia.
