= Catering and Tourism Workers' Union =

The Catering and Tourism Workers' Union (Serbo-Croatian: Sindikata radnika u ugostiteljstvu i turizmu) was a trade union representing workers in the hospitality industry in Yugoslavia.

The union was founded in 1974, when the Union of Service Workers was split up. Like its predecessor, it affiliated to the Confederation of Trade Unions of Yugoslavia. By 1990, it had grown to 250,000 members and was led by Milan Frković. That year, it split into various more localised unions, including the Independent Trade Union in Croatian Hospitality and Tourism.
