= Union of Textile and Leather Workers =

The Union of Textile and Leather Workers (Serbo-Croatian: Sindikat tekstilno-kožarskih radnika was a trade union representing workers in the textile and related industries, in Yugoslavia.

The union was founded in 1955, when the Union of Workers and Employees of the Leather Processing Industry merged with the Union of Workers and Employees of the Textile and Clothing Industry. Like both its predecessors, it affiliated to the Confederation of Trade Unions of Yugoslavia. On formation, it claimed 108,283 members, and was led by Greta Kavaj.

In 1963, it merged with the Union of Metal Workers, the Union of Mining, Metallurgical and Chemical Workers, the Union of Printing Workers, and the Union of Wood Industry Workers, to form the Union of Industrial and Mining Workers.
