= United Federation of Workers' Unions of Yugoslavia =

Yugoslavian trade union federation

The United Federation of Workers' Unions of Yugoslavia (Serbo-Croatian: Ujedinjeni radnički sindikalni savez Jugoslavije, URSSJ) was a trade union federation in Yugoslavia.

The federation was established in 1922 as the Yugoslav General Confederation of Labour, and affiliated with the Social Democratic Party of Yugoslavia. Despite this affiliation, it avoided political activity, focusing on economic matters affecting workers, and also avoided taking industrial action.

The federation became the URSSJ in 1925. It grew slowly, reaching 25,000 members in 1928, and 56,421 in 1938. From 1934, it became more militant, as the Communist Party of Yugoslavia became increasingly active in it. In 1940, it was banned by the government, at which point it claimed around 100,000 members. After World War II, it was replaced by the Confederation of Trade Unions of Yugoslavia.
