= Union of Transport and Communications Workers of Yugoslavia =

Yugoslav trade union

The Union of Transport and Communications Workers of Yugoslavia (Serbo-Croatian: Sindikat radnika saobraćaja i veze Jugoslavije) was a trade union representing workers in the transportation and communications sectors in Yugoslavia.

The union was founded in 1959, with the merger of the Union of Maritime Workers, the Union of Postal, Telegraph and Telephone Employees, Union of Railwaymen, and the Union of Transport Workers. Like all its predecessors, it affiliated to the Confederation of Trade Unions of Yugoslavia. By 1965, it claimed 306,000 members, and was led by Dane Olbina.

In 1974, the Union of Maritime and River Shipping Workers split away. The union split in 1990, into several smaller unions, including the Independent Trade Union of Railway Maintenance Workers of the ŽTP, the Independent Trade Union of Electrical Installations of HŽP, the Independent Trade Union of Croatian Road Workers, the Independent Trade Union of Croatian Road Workers and the Federation of Trade Unions of Croatian Post and Telecommunications Workers.
