= Union of Communal and Craft Workers =

The Union of Communal and Craft Workers (Serbo-Croatian: Sindikat komunalnih i zanatskih radnika was a trade union representing workers in the utilities sector, personal services, small-scale crafts, and professional occupations, in Yugoslavia.

The union was founded in 1955, when the Communal Enterprise Workers' Union merged with the Craft Workers' Union. Like both its predecessors, it affiliated to the Confederation of Trade Unions of Yugoslavia. On formation, it claimed 131,986 members, and was led by Ratko Kuruzović.

In 1959, it merged with the Union of Workers in Trade, Catering and Tourism, to form the Union of Service Workers.
