= Union of Workers in Trade, Catering and Tourism =

The Union of Workers in Trade, Catering and Tourism (Serbo-Croatian: Sindikat trgovinskih, ugostiteljskih i turističkih radnika) was a trade union representing workers in the retail and hospitality industries in Yugoslavia.

The union was founded in 1955, when the Union of Trade Workers merged with the Union of Workers and Employees of the Catering and Tourism Economy. Like both its predecessors, it affiliated to the Confederation of Trade Unions of Yugoslavia. On formation, it claimed 132,916 members, and was led by Slobodan Čirić.

In 1959, it merged with the Union of Communal and Craft Workers, to form the Union of Service Workers.
