= Union of Wood Industry Workers =

The Union of Wood Industry Workers (Serbo-Croatian: Sindikat radnika industrije drveta) was a trade union representing workers in the woodworking and forestry industries in Yugoslavia.

The union was founded in 1945, and affiliated to the Confederation of Trade Unions of Yugoslavia. By 1954, it claimed 94,337 members, and was led by Josip Bosnar.

In 1963, it merged with the Union of Metal Workers, the Union of Mining, Metallurgical and Chemical Workers, the Union of Printing Workers, and the Union of Textile and Leather Workers, to form the Union of Industrial and Mining Workers.
