= Union of Agricultural Workers and Employees =

The Union of Agricultural Workers and Employees (Serbo-Croatian: Sindikat poljoprivredno-šumarskih radnika i službenika) was a trade union representing workers in the agricultural and forestry sectors in Yugoslavia.

The union was founded in April 1945 and affiliated to the Confederation of Trade Unions of Yugoslavia. By 1954, it claimed 84,792 members, and was led by Emil Kevrešan. In 1959, it merged with the Union of Food and Tobacco Workers, to form the Union of Agricultural, Food Processing and Tobacco Workers of Yugoslavia.
