= Judicial and Administrative Institutions Employees Union of Yugoslavia =

The Judicial and Administrative Institutions Employees Union of Yugoslavia was a trade union in Yugoslavia, which organized employees at the courts, the ministries of Justice, Interior and Foreign Affairs, the AVNOJ bureau and similar institutions. The union was founded in Belgrade in January 1945. In the autumn of 1946, the union merged with the Economic-Administrative and Technical Institutions Employees Union, forming the State Administrative and Judicial Institutions Employees Union.
