= Union of Agricultural, Food Processing and Tobacco Workers of Yugoslavia =

Yugoslav trade union

The Union of Agricultural, Food Processing and Tobacco Workers of Yugoslavia (Serbo-Croatian: Sindikat poljoprivrednih, prehrambenih i duhanskih radnika Jugoslavije) was a trade union representing workers in several related industries in Yugoslavia.

The union was founded in 1959, when the Union of Agricultural Workers and Employees merged with the Union of Food and Tobacco Workers. Like both its predecessors, it affiliated to the Confederation of Trade Unions of Yugoslavia. By 1965, it claimed 373,000 members and was led by Ilija Tepavac.

In 1990, the union split in several smaller unions, including the Croatian Union of Workers in Agriculture, Food, Tobacco and Water Management.
