= Union of Public Service Workers =

The Union of Public Service Workers (Serbo-Croatian: Sindikat radnika društvenih djelatnosti) was a trade union representing civil servants and workers in the education and arts sectors, in Yugoslavia.

The union was founded in 1963, with the merger of the Union of Health Workers, the Union of State Administration Employees, the Union of Educational and Scientific Workers, the Union of Cultural and Artistic Institutions and the Federation of Trade Unions of Civil Servants and Public Service Workers. Like all its predecessors, it affiliated to the Confederation of Trade Unions of Yugoslavia. By 1965, it claimed 516,000 members, and was led by Ilija Topaloski.

In 1974, the union was split into the Union of Workers in Culture, Arts, Radio and Television, the Union of Workers in Education and Science, the Union of Monetary and Financial Workers of Croatia, the Union of Administrative and Judicial Workers, and the Health and Social Care Workers' Union.
