= State Administrative and Judicial Institutions Employees Union =

Former trade union in Yugoslavia

The State Administrative and Judicial Institutions Employees Union was a trade union in Yugoslavia, founded in the autumn of 1946 through the merger of the Economic-Administrative and Technical Institutions Employees Union and the Judicial and Administrative Institutions Employees Union of Yugoslavia. In 1949 the union merged with the Financial Employees Trade Union, forming the Union of State Administration Employees.
