= 1953 Yugoslavian parliamentary election =

- 22–24 November 1953

All seats in the Federal Council All seats in the Council of Producers
- Turnout: 89%
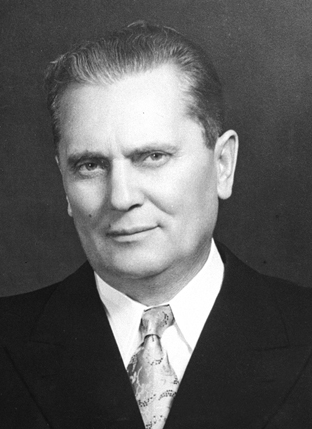
	First party
Leader	Josip Broz Tito
Party	SKJ
Alliance	SSRNJ
Seats won	282
Percentage	95.3%
President of the Republic before election
Josip Broz Tito
SKJ
President of the Republic after election
Josip Broz Tito
SKJ

Parliamentary elections were held in Yugoslavia between 22 and 24 November 1953. Candidates backed by the LCY-dominated Socialist Alliance of Working People of Yugoslavia won every seat.

== Background ==
A new electoral law was adopted in September 1953, introducing several reforms. Independent candidates could self-nominate with either the support of a voters' meeting or 200 signatures, rather than having to be nominated by the Socialist Alliance. It was also required that there be at least two candidates in each constituency. For the first time, paper ballots were used, with voters marking their ballot paper in closed booths.

The 282 deputies of the Federal People's Assembly included 116 from Serbia, 66 from Croatia, 48 from Bosnia and Herzegovina, 24 from Slovenia, 21 from Macedonia and 7 from Montenegro.

== Results ==
With multiple candidates allowed, the elections saw some serious contests, with 14 non-Alliance candidates running in Macedonia, although two of them were withdrawn shortly before election day. However, candidates supported by the Alliance won in every seat and it was reported that Alliance candidates had received 95.3% of the vote, with voter turnout at 89%. Milovan Đilas received the highest vote share of any candidate (98.8%), with Josip Broz Tito receiving 97.7%.

After losing by a narrow margin, former diplomat Ljubo Drndić requested a recount. However, he was publicly admonished and threatened with legal action.

=== Federal Council ===
Party	Votes	%	Seats
People's Front of Yugoslavia	9,045,857	100.00	282
Total	9,045,857	100.00	282
Valid votes	9,045,857	95.66	
Invalid/blank votes	410,050	4.34	
Total votes	9,455,907	100.00	
Registered voters/turnout	10,580,648	89.37	
Source: Sternberger et al.
