= Economic-Administrative and Technical Institutions Employees Union =

The Economic-Administrative and Technical Institutions Employees Union was a trade union in Yugoslavia, which organized employees at ministries of Construction, Mining, Forestry, Agriculture, Industry, Trade and Consumption, as well as staff at the Reconstruction Commission, National Statistics Commission and similar institutions. The union was founded in Belgrade in January 1945. In the autumn of 1946, the union merged with the Judicial and Administrative Institutions Employees Union of Yugoslavia, forming the State Administrative and Judicial Institutions Employees Union.
