= Confederation of Independent Trade Unions of Bosnia and Herzegovina =

Confederation of trade unions

SSSBiH
- Confederation of Independent Trade Unions of Bosnia and Herzegovina
- Savez Samostalnih Sindikata Bosne i Hercegovine
- Founded: 1905
- Headquarters: Sarajevo, Bosnia and Herzegovina
- Location: Bosnia and Herzegovina
- Members: 200,000 - 270,000
- Key people: Selvedin Šatorović, president (President of Independent Trade Union of Primary Schools Education of Federation of Bosnia and Herzegovina); Mirnes Isaković, vice-president (President of the Confederation of Independent Trade Unions of Bosnia and Herzegovina - Board of Zenica-Doboj Canton); Bajro Melez, vice-president (President of the Union of Metal Workes of Federation of Bosnia and Herzegovina)
- Affiliations: ITUC
- Website: http://sssbih.com.ba/index.htm

The Confederation of Independent Trade Unions of Bosnia and Herzegovina is a trade union centre in Bosnia and Herzegovina. It was founded in 1905. ICTUR reports that "the SSSBiH is preoccupied primarily with the consequences of privatization and the high rate of unemployment and problems such as wage arrears."

The SSSBiH is affiliated with the International Trade Union Confederation.
