= 1945 Yugoslavian parliamentary election =

- 11 November 1945

All 354 seats in the Federal Assembly All 175 seats in the Assembly of Nations
- Turnout: 88.57%
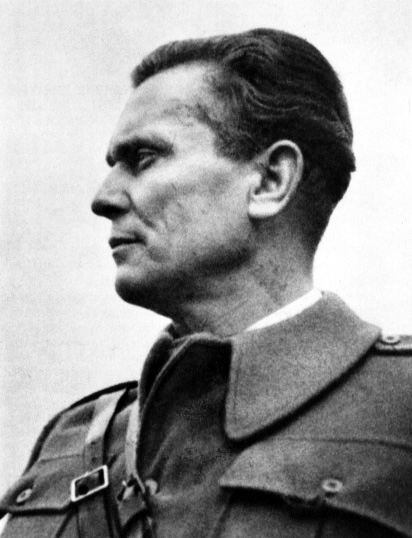
| | First party |
|---|---|
| Leader | Josip Broz Tito |
| Party | KPJ |
| Alliance | People's Front |
| Seats won | 354 |
| Percentage | 90.48% |
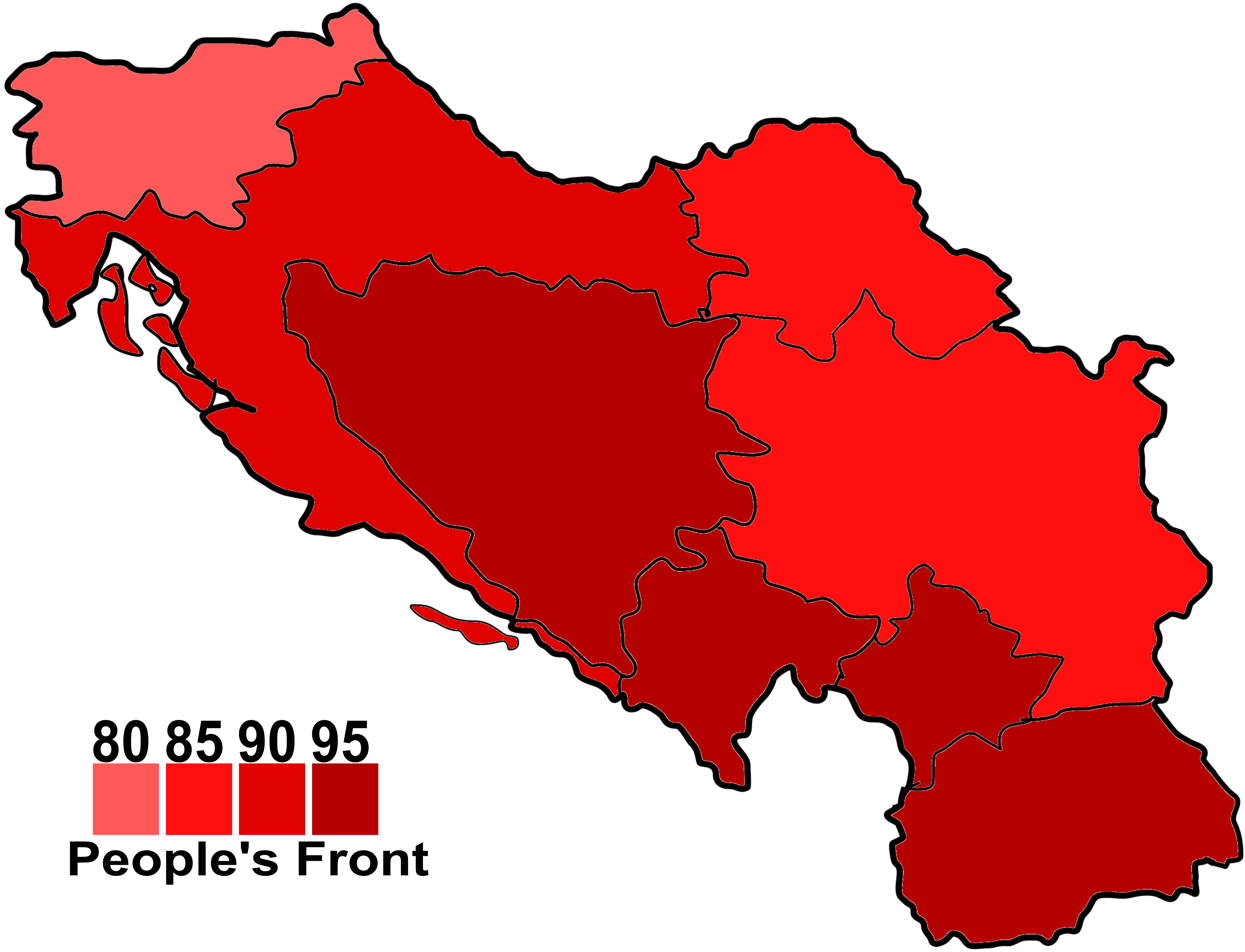
Prime Minister before election
Josip Broz Tito
KPJ
Prime Minister after election
Josip Broz Tito
KPJ

Parliamentary elections were held in Yugoslavia on 11 November 1945. Due to an opposition boycott, the governing People's Front, dominated by the Communist Party of Yugoslavia, was the only organisation to participate in the elections. The Front officially claimed 90% of the vote, with turnout at 89%.

== Electoral system ==
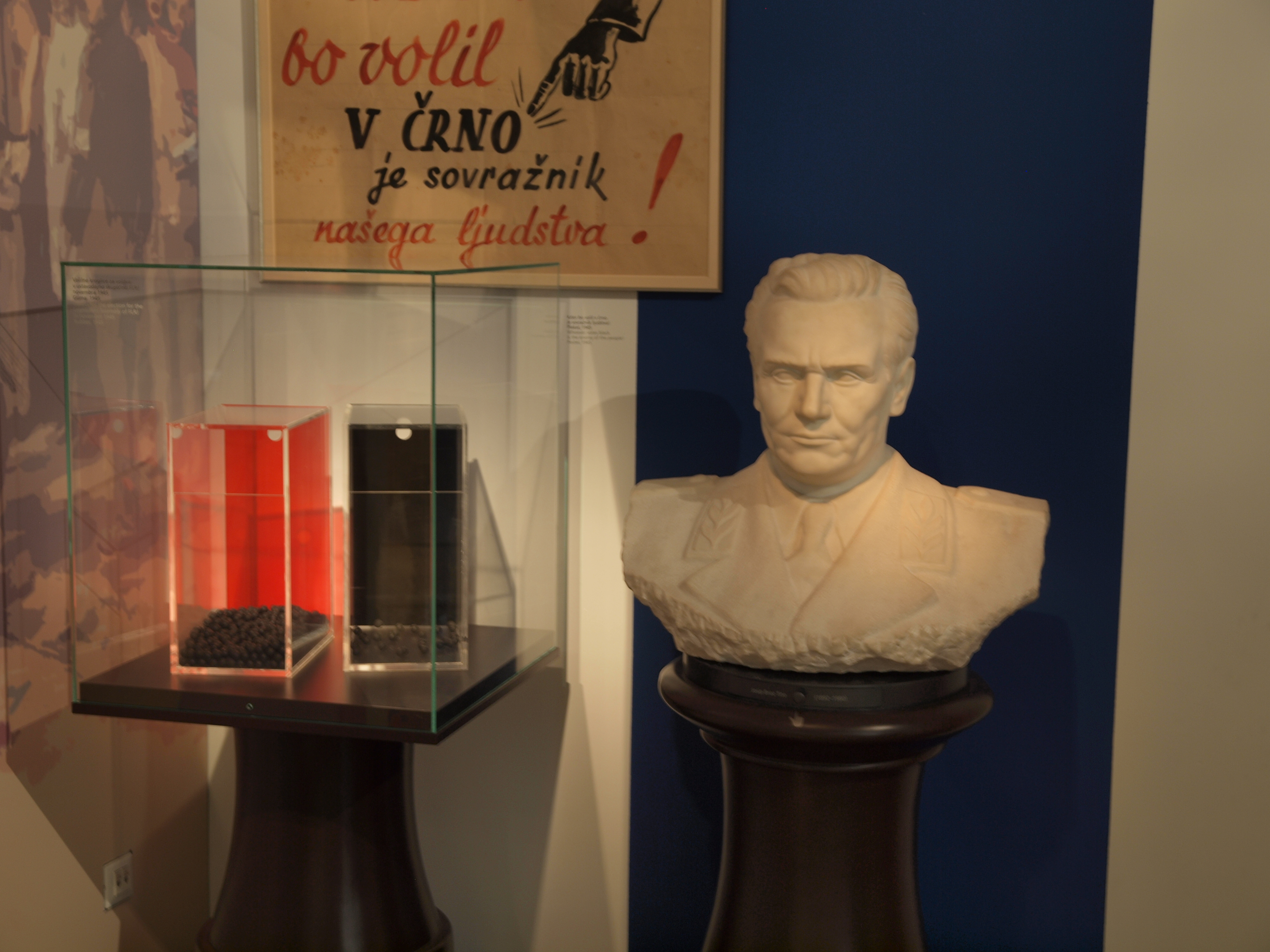
A museum exhibit of the ballot boxes in the election in Ljubljana, Slovenia next to a bust of Josip Broz Tito. The text above the ballot boxes reads "He who votes black is an enemy of our people!"

The elections were held under a system approved by the Yugoslav Provisional Parliament. Josip Broz Tito claimed it was to be the "most democratic [election] Yugoslavia has ever had" and promised that the opposition would be allowed to participate in the elections. All men and women over 18 were granted the right to vote, although "traitors" were denied the right to vote. The government claimed this covered around 3% of voters, although the opposition put the figure much higher. Over seven million people were ultimately registered.

The electoral law provided for a bicameral Constitutional Assembly with a 354-seat National Assembly and a 175-seat Assembly of Nations. The National Assembly had one seat for every 40,000 voters. Voting was conducted using rubber balls, which voters deposited in a ballot box marked with the label of the party they intended to vote for. Voters had to place their hands in both ballot boxes to maintain the secrecy of which party they had voted for.

Despite the opposition boycott, ballot boxes for the opposition were placed in polling stations alongside those for the People's Front following an amendment to the electoral law.

== Campaign ==
The People's Front consisted of the major pre-war parties in the country, and ran under the slogan "Confirm our victory!" (Serbo-Croatian: Potvrdite našu pobjedu!).

Despite claiming significant support in Croatia and Serbia, the pro-monarchy opposition refused to contest the elections, claiming to have faced intimidation. An opposition newspaper, Demokratija, was closed down a week before the elections, with the government claiming it was attempting to damage Yugoslav Army morale and encourage foreign intervention.

== Results ==
=== Federal Assembly ===
| Party | Votes | % | Seats |
|---|---|---|---|
| People's Front | 6,725,047 | 90.48 | 354 |
| Opposition | 707,422 | 9.52 | 0 |
| Total | 7,432,469 | 100.00 | 354 |
| Registered voters/turnout | 8,383,455 | 88.66 | |
Source: Banac, Službeni List

=== Assembly of Nations ===
| Party | Votes | % | Seats |
|---|---|---|---|
| People's Front | 6,574,975 | 88.69 | 175 |
| Opposition | 838,239 | 11.31 | 0 |
| Total | 7,413,214 | 100.00 | 175 |
| Registered voters/turnout | 8,383,455 | 88.43 | |
Source: Službeni List

== Aftermath ==
Eighteen days after the elections, the newly elected legislature formally abolished the monarchy and declared the Federal People's Republic of Yugoslavia (later renamed the Socialist Federal Republic of Yugoslavia). This marked the onset of undisguised communist party rule. For the next four and a half decades, the Communist Party (later renamed the League of Communists) would govern the country as a one-party state.
