= Commission on Statutory Questions =

Statutory organ of the League of Communists of Yugoslavia

Commission on Statutory Questions Komisija za statutarna pitanja (Serbo-Croatian)

Overview
- Type: Statutory organ
- Elected by: Congress
- Length of term: Varied from 4 to 6 years
- Term limits: None

History
- Established: by 4th Congress on 28 July 1948; 76 years ago
- Disbanded: Ceased to exist on 22 January 1990; 35 years ago

Leadership
- Leader office: President
- Executive organ: Commission sessions
- Administrative officer: Secretary

Meeting place
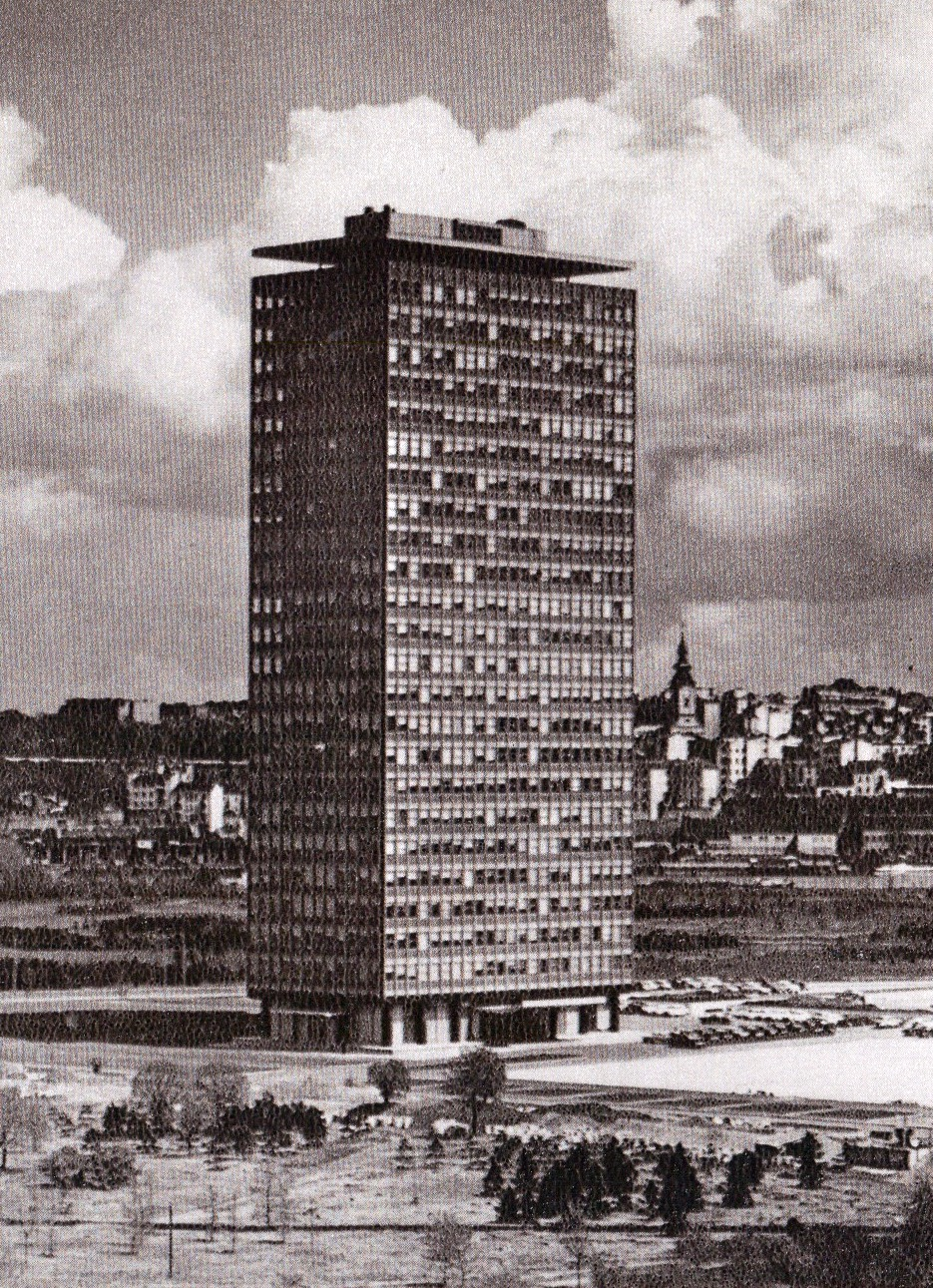
- Palace of Socio-Political Organisations

Statute
- "Statute of the League of Communists of Yugoslavia"

The Commission on Statutory Questions (CSQ) was the statutory organ of the League of Communists of Yugoslavia (LCY), the ruling party of the Socialist Federal Republic of Yugoslavia. It was elected by, and accountable to, the Congress of the LCY. Throughout its history, the commission underwent several name changes. It was known as the Central Control Commission from 1948 to 1964, the Control Commission from 1964 to 1969 and the Commission on Statutory Questions from 1969 until the LCY's dissolution. Foreign observers often referred to the commission as the statutory commission. The commission was headed by a president and a secretary, similar to the Presidency of the LCY Central Committee.

== History ==
At first, the Central Control Commission was institutionally subordinated to the LCY Central Committee and informally to Josip Broz Tito's heir apparent Aleksandar Ranković. To take an example. When Serbian communist Predrag Ajtić was expelled from the LCY in 1962, he appealed directly to the LCY Central Committee but got no response. He then appealed to the Central Control Commission, which dissuaded him from appealing directly to the coming party congress and proposed instead of appealing directly to Ranković personally. Ranković then personally decided that Ajtić could rejoin the party, but that the event that had caused his expulsion in the first place would not be reexamined. However, the commission could also formulate constructive criticism of the party. For instance, in November 1963 it stated in a report that both ordinary members and leading officials tended to curtail members' right to criticise individuals and policies. The 8th LCY Congress, held on 7–13 December 1964, amended the party statute so that the party congress elected the commission and not the LCY Central Committee. Lazar Koliševski, a high-standing party official, in his speech to the 8th LCY Congress, claimed that this rule change made the commission independent of the LCY Central Committee. This, he argued, would make it easier for the commission to supervise and enforce the party statute. However, he later qualified this statement by saying that the commission would continue working alongside the LCY Central Committee.

This institutional framework established lasted until the 5th Session of the Central Committee of the 8th Congress on 4 October 1966. Earlier, at the 4th Session of the Central Committee of the 8th Congress on 1 July 1966, the LCY had purged Ranković, the Vice President of Yugoslavia and the head of the State Security Administration, for allegedly bugging Tito's bedroom. To reduce the over-centralisation of power in key individuals, the same session established the Commission for the Reorganisation and Further Development of the LCY (CRFD–LCY), headed by Mijalko Todorović, to recommend party organisational reform. During the debate on party reform, According to scholar April Carter, "The Control Commission noted a complete lack of interest in its future during the 1967 discussions on reorganisation and therefore undertook to debate the question itself." Arguing against those who believed the commission was superfluous, the commission argued that it was needed to safeguard the party's rules. It proposed reforming its composition by turning the republican control commissions into final courts of appeal on disciplinary matters and turning the federal control commission into a constitutional court of sorts tasked with safeguarding the party's regulatory order. It was tasked by supervising organs to ensure that democratic practices were observed within the party, propose and consider statutory amendments, and supervise and keep the league branches' statutes in line with the federal statute. The 9th LCY Congress, held on 11–15 March 1969, amended the party statute to reflect these changes and changed the name of the commission to the "Commission of Statutory Questions of the League of Communists of Yugoslavia". The 9th LCY Congress amended the federal statute to state that the statutes of the league branches had a year to amend their statutes to make them in line with the last federal statute amendment. In June 1969, the statutory commission convened a meeting to begin the process of amending the league branch statutes, and in November later that year, it noted that all branches had amended their statutes to be in line with the federal one.

== Authority and powers ==
The CSQ was elected by, and accountable to, the Congress of the LCY, the league's highest forum. The commission had to report on its activities at each congress since the last convened congress. The report given to the congress had to be approved by voting. If the report failed to garner endorsement from congress, a discussion would ensue and would end with a vote of confidence on the CSQ. If the vote of confidence were successful, the congress would organise a new election on the CSQ's composition. The CSQ could only adopt decisions within the scope of its work and responsibility and had no powers outside of its statutory functions. Together with the lower-level statutory commissions, the CSQ ensured that the statute was applied consistently within the party. It monitored the implementation of the statute's provisions, issued warnings whenever it identified deviations from statutory principles or norms, and made recommendations to the relevant party organisations, forums, and organs to eliminate them. As part of its analysis of complaints regarding violations of statutory principles and norms, and in evaluating whether various decisions and actions within the party were in accordance with the statute, the commission could make autonomous decisions per its rights and responsibilities and according to the procedures outlined in the statute, at the request of party members, organisations, and organs. It was mandatory for all members, basic organizations, forums, and organs of the party to comply with the CSQ's decisions.

Article 88 of the party statute stated that candidates for CSQ membership was elected in an identical manner as candidates for LCY Central Committee membership. Meaning that candidates for membership of the CSQ were nominated by communal conferences and other corresponding conferences, applying a democratic procedure based on uniform criteria. Nominees were decided by the congress of the LC branches, according to their respective jurisdictions. Each LC republican branch had an equal number of representatives in the CSQ while the non-republican branches had one representative each. A president of a statutory questions commission in a branch was an ex officio member of the commission. Changes in the composition of the CSQ due to changes in the ex officio members were ratified by the first convened commission session after the fact. The president and secretary of the CSQ were elected from amongst its own members, and they had to serve their electoral term out since elections during a mandate could not be repeated. In addition, the LCY Central Committee had the right to set the number of members the party congress could elect to the CSQ.

The CSQ president had the right to convene meetings of the commission whenever possible, but it could also convene on the proposal of its own members. The LCY Central Committee, the LCY Presidency and the central committees and statutory commissions of the republican branches also had the right to propose meetings of the CSQ, but could not convene them. The president set the meeting's agenda, and the officeholder chaired the commission's meetings. The Commission on Statutory Questions was authorised to interpret statute provisions and to determine whether provisions in the LCY statutes did not conform with the statutes of the republican and Yugoslav People's Army branches. In line with these powers, the commission had the right to make proposals, monitor statute work, and analyse the implementation of the LCY statute. Further, it could make recommendations to the Presidency, the Central Committee, and the Congress of the LCY regarding ways to improve the enforcement of statutory norms and prevent violations. It was the sole organ with the right to prepare proposals on the amendment and supplementation of the statute to the LCY Congress. Either the CSQ initiated these proposals, or ordinary party members or LCY organs initiated them. Based on its own conclusion, the CSQ could reject these initiatives if it considered the proposals unuseful. The LCY statute made clear that the branch statutes could adopt their own statutes only on the "basis" and "in conformity" of the federal one.

Every party member, organisation, forum and party organ could request the commission to assess whether certain acts conformed with the statute. Within two months of a decision being made, they could appeal to the CSQ the decision of the commissions of statutory questions of a republican and military branch concerning disputes concerning seniority and expulsions. The CSQ was also entitled to examine complaints or requests to assess whether decisions on expulsion from the LCY were correct. When deemed necessary, the commission could initiate consultation on such matters with the statutory commissions of an LCY branch and institute proceedings to clarify the circumstances further and to determine facts and the justification for passing the decision on expulsion. If a member of the LCY Central Committee or a committee of one of the branches appealed against their expulsion from the LCY, the CSQ was required to notify the LCY Presidency thereof. The commission and the presidency would then consider the appeal together in cooperation with the relevant branch committee.
