= Socialist Alliance of Working People =

Mass organization in SFR Yugoslavia

Socialist Alliance of Working People of Yugoslavia
- Socijalistički savez radnog naroda Jugoslavije; SSRNJ (Serbo-Croatian); Социјалистички савез радног народа Југославије; ССРНЈ (Serbo-Croatian); Socialistična zveza delovnega ljudstva Jugoslavije; SZDLJ (Slovene); Социјалистички сојуз на работниот народ на Југославија; ССРНЈ (Macedonian) (Note: People's Front of Yugoslavia, before 1953: Narodna fronta Jugoslavije / Narodni front Jugoslavije; NFJ (Serbo-Croatian); Народна фронта Југославије / Народни фронт Југославије; НФЈ (Serbo-Croatian); Ljudska fronta; LF (Slovene); Народен фронт на Југославија; НФЈ (Macedonian))
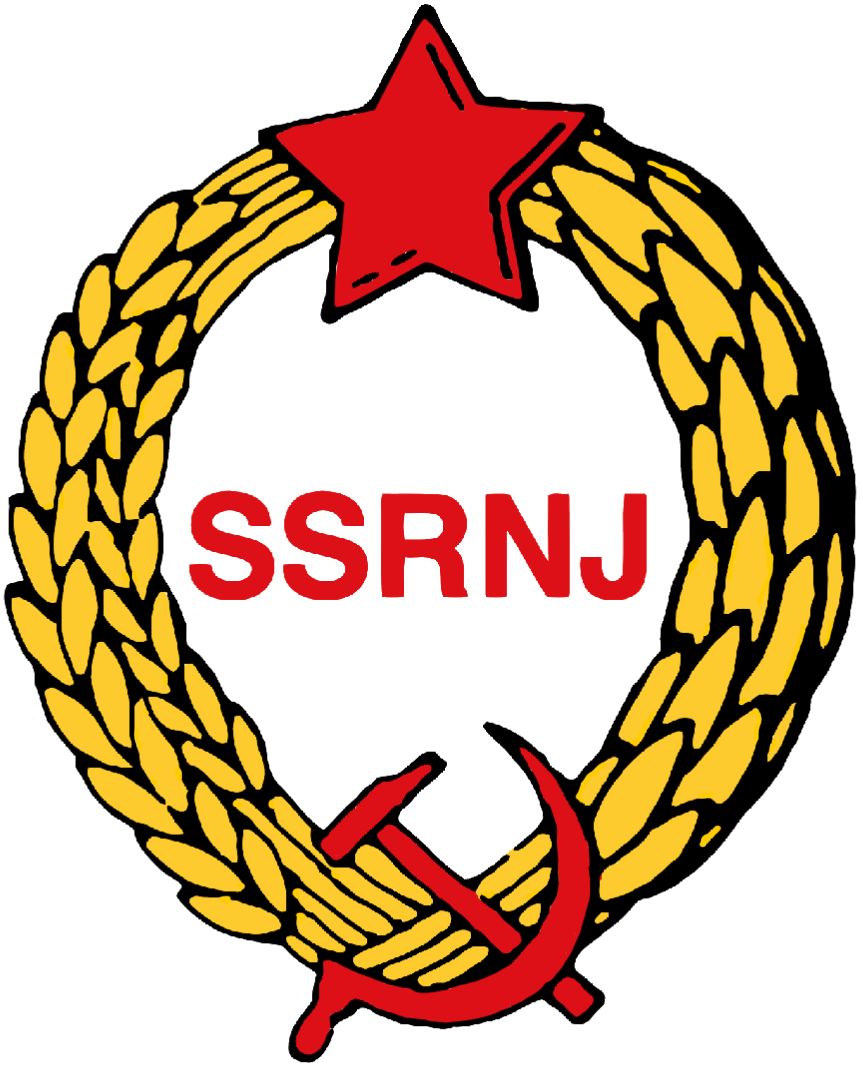
- Post-1953 emblem
- Formation: August 1945
- Dissolved: 1990
- Headquarters: Belgrade
- Location: Socialist Federal Republic of Yugoslavia
- Members: up to 13,000,000
- President: Veljko Milatović
- Ideology: Communism; Marxism–Leninism; Titoism (from 1948)
- Remarks: The People's Front of Yugoslavia was renamed the Socialist Alliance of Working People of Yugoslavia in 1953

The Socialist Alliance of Working People of Yugoslavia (SSRNJ), known before 1953 as the People's Front of Yugoslavia (NFJ), was the largest and most influential mass organization in SFR Yugoslavia from August 1945 through 1990. It succeeded the Unitary National Liberation Front, which gathered and politically backed anti-fascist layers of society throughout Yugoslavia since 1934. By 1990, SSRNJ's membership was thirteen million individuals, including most of the adult population of the country. The Serbian Socialist Alliance of Working People merged with the League of Communists of Serbia in July 1990 to form the Socialist Party of Serbia.

== People's Front of Yugoslavia ==
People's Front of Yugoslavia was an organization of antifascist and democratic masses of nations of Yugoslavia. The idea of its creation sprang up in the 1930s, especially during the May 5, 1935 parliamentary elections in the Kingdom of Yugoslavia.

At the Plenary Meeting of the Central Committee of the Communist Party of Yugoslavia in June 1935 held in the city of Split (Dalmatia) it was concluded to form the Front of National Freedom. Also it was concluded that Fascism could be defeated by the joint efforts of proletariat, peasantry, nationally oppressed and all democratic and progressive layers of society. The basis for the Front of the People's Freedom would be the Communist Party of Yugoslavia joined by the trade unions, "left wings" of the peasant parties, youth, university students, cultural, educational, sports societies, different professional associations and national liberation movements under the auspices of civic parties. The main platform was:

1. The destruction of the 6 January Regime,
2. Equal rights of the nations of Yugoslavia,
3. Preventing the burden of crisis on the back of the People and improving the economic position of broad working masses at the expense of the rich.

The Communist Party of Yugoslavia comprehended the People's Front (NF) as a political platform for the approaching of masses with its ideas and as a method of alliance with other opposition parties like civic, republican and democratic bourgeois parties.

The Communist Party of Yugoslavia was banned from political life of the country but remained seized with the matter of creating a singular People's Front up to the beginning of World War II.

At the conference in Stolice (Serbia) it was concluded that the antifascist movement should be transformed to a United People's Liberation Front of Yugoslavia.

Each of the future republics and autonomous provinces had its own People's Liberation Front.

=== People's front of republics and provinces ===
Name of the people's front	Date of first lands' conference	Place, Republic or province
United People's Liberation Front of Croatia	May 18, 1944	Croatia
People's Liberation Front of Bosnia and Herzegovina	July 3, 1944	Sanski Most, Bosnia and Herzegovina
People's Liberation Front of Montenegro	July 16, 1944	Kolašin, Montenegro
United People's Liberation Front of Serbia	November 14, 1944	Serbia
People's Liberation Front of Macedonia	November 26, 1944	Skopje, Macedonia
People's Liberation Front of Vojvodina	December 11, 1944	Novi Sad, Vojvodina
People's Liberation Front of Kosovo	April 11 and April 12, 1945	Kosovo
Liberation Front of the Slovene Nation	July 15 and July 16, 1945	Ljubljana, Slovenia

The first congress of the People's Front of Yugoslavia was held in Belgrade from August 5 to August 7, 1945. The Programme and the Statute of the National Front of Yugoslavia were passed. Edvard Kardelj gave the main guidelines for the NFY in his seminary which described the NFY as "the sole of the Nation, its reflection, its heroic uprising, its greatest majority – that it is – the Nation itself".

The NFY was the only organisation to contest the first postwar election, in 1945; opposition parties pulled out after claiming to have experienced severe intimidation. On 29 November, the Communist-dominated parliament formally abolished the monarchy and declared Yugoslavia a republic. From that moment onward, the NFY was effectively the only legally permitted political organisation in the country.

At the fourth congress of the NFY it changed its name to the Socialist Alliance of the Working People of Yugoslavia. The congress accepted the proposal of the sixth congress of the Communist Party of Yugoslavia to have the name changed at the fourth congress of the National Front of Yugoslavia, held in Belgrade from February 22 to February 25, 1953.

=== Member organizations of the PFY ===
- Antifascist Front of Women of Yugoslavia (AFŽ)
- Croatian Republican Peasant Party
- Independent Democratic Party
- Agrarian Party
- National Peasant Party
- Socialist Party of Yugoslavia
- Social-Democratic Party of Yugoslavia
- United Alliance of Antifascist Youth of Yugoslavia (USAOJ)
- United Trade Union of Workers and Employees (JSRiN)
- Yugoslav Republican Democratic Party

Parties that were not members of the People's Front:

- Democratic Party
- National Radical Party

=== Parliamentary elections ===
Election	Leader	Votes	%	Seats	+/–	Position	Government
1945	Josip Broz Tito		90.48%	354 / 354	▲354	▲1st	Sole legal coalition
1950	Josip Broz Tito		94.2%	354 / 354		1st	Sole legal coalition

== Reform and renaming ==
In 1953, the People's Front was renamed the Socialist Alliance of Working People of Yugoslavia (SSRNJ) and it would continue to be the largest (in terms of membership) mass organization in SFR Yugoslavia from August 1945 through 1990.

The political purpose of this national organization, sponsored by the League of Communists of Yugoslavia (SKJ), was to involve as many people as possible in activities on the party agenda, without the restrictions and negative connotations of direct party control. The SSRNJ also was chartered as a national arbitration forum for competing, cross-regional interests. Although party officials were forbidden to hold simultaneous office in SSRNJ, the top echelon of the latter was dominated by established party members. The importance of SSRNJ to the party leadership increased as the party's direct control over social and state institutions decreased. It was useful in mobilizing otherwise apathetic citizens during the Croatian crisis of 1971 and the Kosovo crisis of 1987.

The Constitution stipulated a wide variety of social and political functions for SSRNJ, including nomination of candidates for delegate at the commune level, suggesting solutions to national and local social issues to assembly delegates, and overseeing elections and public policy implementation. Both individuals and interest groups held membership. The structure of SSRNJ was very similar to that of the party, including a hierarchy that extended from national to commune level. SSRNJ organizations in the republics and provinces were simplified versions of the national structure. By 1959, the SSRNJ counted over 6.3 million individual members and 111 collective organizations under its umbrella.

The national organization was run by a conference of delegates chosen by the regional SSRNJ leadership. The conference presidium included members from the party, the armed forces, trade unions, Socialist Youth League, and other national organizations. Like the SKJ Central Committee, the SSRNJ conference established departments to formulate policy recommendations in areas such as economics, education, and sociopolitical relations. Coordinating committees were also active in interregional consultation on policy and mass political action.

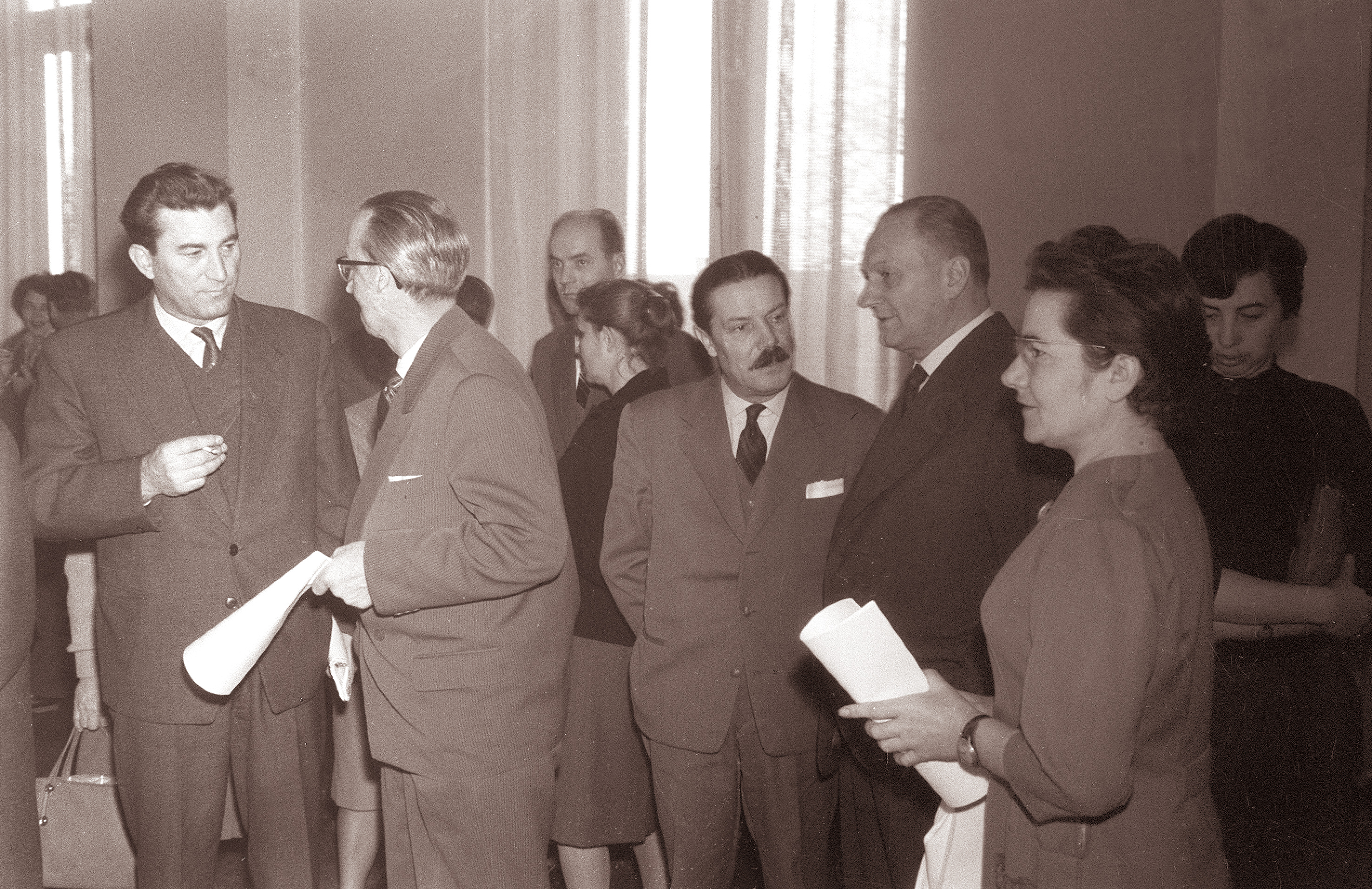
Delegates of Maribor branch of SZDL in informal talk before the conference, January 1962

In SR Slovenia, the Socialist Alliance became an umbrella organization for a number of nonparty organizations with political interests, beginning in 1988. On a lesser scale, similar changes occurred in other republics. This development rekindled the idea that SSRNJ might be divorced from SKJ domination and reconstituted as a second political party at the national level. Pending such an event, SSRNJ was regarded throughout the 1980s as a puppet of the party elite, particularly by virtue of its exclusive control over the nomination of assembly delegates at the commune level.

One of the Presidents of the Federal Conference was Veljko Milatović.

=== Constituent Organizations Within the SSRNJ ===
- Confederation of Trade Unions of Yugoslavia
- League of Socialist Youth of Yugoslavia
- Red Cross of Yugoslavia
- Federation of Veterans Associations of the People’s Liberation War of Yugoslavia
- Women's Antifascist Front of Yugoslavia
- Partisan Society for Physical Education
- Council of Associations for Child Welfare in Yugoslavia
- Union of Pioneers of Yugoslavia
- Society of Mechanical and Electrical Engineers and Technicians
- Fund for Aid to Victims of Colonial Aggression and Domination
- Coordination Committee for Aid to the People of Vietnam-Indochina
