= Đilasism =

Yugoslav communist politics

Đilasism refers to the Yugoslav communist politics of the influence of Yugoslav communist Milovan Đilas.

Đilasism started as a breakaway faction of Titoism. Đilas rejected Stalinism as inherently totalitarian, imperialist and state capitalist. He was also highly critical of the bureaucracy, viewing bureaucrats as their own social class which enjoyed social privilege and tended to use ideological repression for self-serving reasons.

== Theory ==
Đilasism arose as a break from Titoism pursued by the Yugoslav government of Josip Broz Tito. Đilas published articles in Borba in 1950, collectively titled Savremene teme ("Modern topics"), expressing his ideas on the socialist path of Yugoslavia and his criticisms of the Soviet Union.

In Đilas' analysis of the USSR, he argued that the Stalinist totalitarian state system is inherently imperialist and state capitalist. Some within the leadership of the League of Communists of Yugoslavia viewed these articles as "heresies". Several members of the Central Committee of the LCY were in agreement with Đilas' ideas, and during later political investigations one even confessed that he had "written an article propagating Djilasism."

Đilas criticised the bureaucracy as the "privileged class", where the source of this social privilege came from its absolutism and it would use ideological repression to preserve this privilege. He also believed that the party and state should be separate entities, and along with Edvard Kardelj, that in time political opposition would be allowed as the state and the party withered away.

== Pejorative and repression ==
The word was often used as pejorative, including by Tito, while Đilas himself personally denied that such an ideology existed.

Several publications were suppressed and journalists arrested on the grounds that they were "Đilasist". These included the magazines Beseda edited by Ivan Minatti, and Revija 57 edited by Veljko Rus.

== See also ==
- New class
- Rankovicism

== Bibliography ==
- Gabrič, Aleš (October 2019). "The Younger Generation's Magazines in the Eyes of the Communist Ideologues". Review of Croatian History. 15 (1): 35–61. doi:10.22586/review.v15i1.9738. ISSN 1845-4380. OCLC 1137264327. S2CID 212824317.
- Hammond, Thomas Taylor (January 1955). "The Djilas Affair and Jugoslav Communism". Foreign Affairs. 33 (2): 298–315. doi:10.2307/20031096. ISSN 0015-7120. JSTOR 20031096. OCLC 26780544.
- Režek, Mateja (November 2006). "Defeat of the First "Party Liberalism" and The Echo of "Djilasism" in Slovenia". Slovene Studies. 28 (1). Society of Slovene Studies: 67–78. doi:10.7152/ssj.v28i1.13961 (inactive 1 July 2025). ISSN 0193-1075. OCLC 456112959.
- Warner Neal, Fred (1958). Titoism in action: the reforms in Yugoslavia after 1948. Berkeley and Los Angeles, California: University of California Press.
