= Ideological repression in the Soviet Union =

Efforts by the Soviet Union to prevent dissenting ideas from spreading

Ideological repression in the Soviet Union targeted various worldviews and the corresponding categories of people.

== Ideological repression in arts ==
Until the late 1920s, various forms of artistic expression were tolerated. However, an increase in the scope of Soviet political repression, marked by the first show trial, the Shakhty Trial, brought into the focus of Bolsheviks the question whether "bourgeois intelligentsia", including workers of culture and arts, can be loyal and trustworthy. As an early step was an instruction to the Russian Association of Proletarian Writers "to scourge and chastise [literature]" in the name of the Party", i.e., effectively encouraging censorship of literature on ideological grounds. Among the first targets were Yevgeny Zamiatin and Boris Pilnyak.

Soon the concept of socialist realism was established, as the officially approved form of art, an instrument of propaganda, and the main touchstone of ideological censorship.

== Repression of religion ==
Political cartoon of Christmas 1921: clergy, imperialists and capitalists follow the Star of Bethlehem, while workers and the Red Army follow the Red Star.

Religion in the Union of Soviet Socialist Republics (USSR) was dominated by the fact that it became the first state to have as one objective of its official ideology the elimination of existing religion, and the prevention of future implanting of religious belief, with the goal of establishing state atheism (gosateizm). However, the main religions of pre-revolutionary Russia persisted throughout the entire Soviet period and religion was never officially outlawed. Christians belonged to various denominations: Orthodox (which had the largest number of followers), Catholic, Baptist and various other Protestant denominations. The majority of the Muslims in the Soviet Union were Sunni, with the notable exception of Azerbaijan, which was majority Shia. Judaism also had many followers. Other religions, practised by a small number of believers, included Buddhism and Shamanism.

== Ideological repression in science ==
Certain scientific fields in the Soviet Union were suppressed after being labeled as ideologically suspect. In some cases the consequences of ideological influences were dramatic. The suppression of research began during the Stalin era and continued, in softened forms, after his regime. Leon Trotsky had defended Einstein's theory of relativity in Soviet intellectual circles but this became an anathema during the Stalin era and was only rehabilitated following the latter's death.

== See also ==
- Bibliography of the Russian Revolution and Civil War
- Bibliography of Stalinism and the Soviet Union
- Bibliography of the post-Stalinist Soviet Union
