= Podbišće =

Podbišće Подбишће
- Village
- Location within Montenegro
- Coordinates: 42.948513°N 19.574720°E
- Country: Montenegro
- Region: Northern
- Municipality: Mojkovac

Population (2011)
  - Total: 658
- Time zone: UTC+1 (CET)
  - Summer (DST): UTC+2 (CEST)

Podbišće (Montenegrin Cyrillic: Подбишће) is a village in the municipality of Mojkovac, Montenegro.

== Demographics ==
According to the 2011 census, its population was 658.

Ethnicity in 2011
Ethnicity	Number	Percentage
Montenegrins	393	59.7%
Serbs	238	36.2%
other/undeclared	27	4.1%
Total	658	100%

== Notable residents ==
- Milovan Djilas
