= Conversations with Stalin =

Memoir by Milovan Djilas

- Author: Milovan Dilas
- Original title: Razgovori sa Staljinom
- Language: Serbo-Croatian
- Genre: Memoir

Conversations with Stalin (Serbo-Croatian: Razgovori sa Staljinom) is a historical memoir by Yugoslav communist and intellectual Milovan Đilas. The book is an account of Đilas's experience of several diplomatic trips to Soviet Russia as a representative of the Yugoslav Communists. Writing in hindsight, Đilas recounts how his initial enthusiasms and feelings of ideological and ethnic brotherhood towards the Russian Communists were replaced by feelings of bitterness and disappointment following his repeated confrontations with the brutal, despotic reality of the Soviet regime under Joseph Stalin. Other figures which appear in the memoir include Josip Broz Tito, Aleksandar Ranković, and Edvard Kardelj of Yugoslavia, Vyacheslav Molotov, Ivan Stepanovich Konev, and Nikita Khrushchev of the Soviet Union, and Georgi Dimitrov of Bulgaria.
