= Political censorship =

Censorship of political opinions

Political censorship is the censorship of political opinions in violation of freedom of speech, freedom of the press or freedom of assembly. Governments can attempt to conceal, fake, distort, or falsify information that its citizens receive by suppressing or crowding out political news that the public might receive through news outlets. In the absence of neutral and objective information, people will be prevented to dissent against the government or political party in charge. The government can enforce media bias to spread the story that the ruling authorities want people to believe. At times this involves bribery, defamation, imprisonment, and even assassination. The term also extends to the systematic suppression of views that are contrary to those of the government in power.

== Statistics ==
According to Committee to Protect Journalists's 2024 prison census the world's leading jailers of journalists are: China, Israel and Palestine, Myanmar, Belarus, Russia, Egypt, Eritrea, Iran, Vietnam, Azerbaijan.

== By jurisdiction ==
=== Cuba ===
The Cuban media is operated under the supervision of the Communist Party's Department of Revolutionary Orientation, which "develops and coordinates propaganda strategies".

=== Singapore ===
In the Republic of Singapore, Section 33 of the Films Act bans of the making, distribution and exhibition of "party political films", at pain of a fine not exceeding $100,000 or to imprisonment for a term not exceeding 2 years. The Act further defines a "party political film" as any film or video

(a) which is an advertisement made by or on behalf of any political party in Singapore or any body whose objects relate wholly or mainly to politics in Singapore, or any branch of such party or body; or

(b) which is made by any person and directed towards any political end in Singapore

In 2001, the short documentary called A Vision of Persistence on opposition politician J. B. Jeyaretnam was also banned for being a "party political film". The makers of the documentary, all lecturers at the Ngee Ann Polytechnic, later submitted written apologies and withdrew the documentary from being screened at the 2001 Singapore International Film Festival in April, having been told they could be charged in court. Another short documentary called Singapore Rebel by Martyn See, which documented Singapore Democratic Party leader Dr Chee Soon Juan's acts of civil disobedience, was banned from the 2005 Singapore International Film Festival on the same grounds and See is being investigated for possible violations of the Films Act.

This law, however, is often disregarded when such political films are made supporting the ruling People's Action Party (PAP). Channel NewsAsia's five-part documentary series on Singapore's PAP ministers in 2005, for example, was not considered a party political film.

Exceptions are also made when political films are made concerning political parties of other nations. Films such as Michael Moore's Fahrenheit 911 are thus allowed to screen regardless of the law.

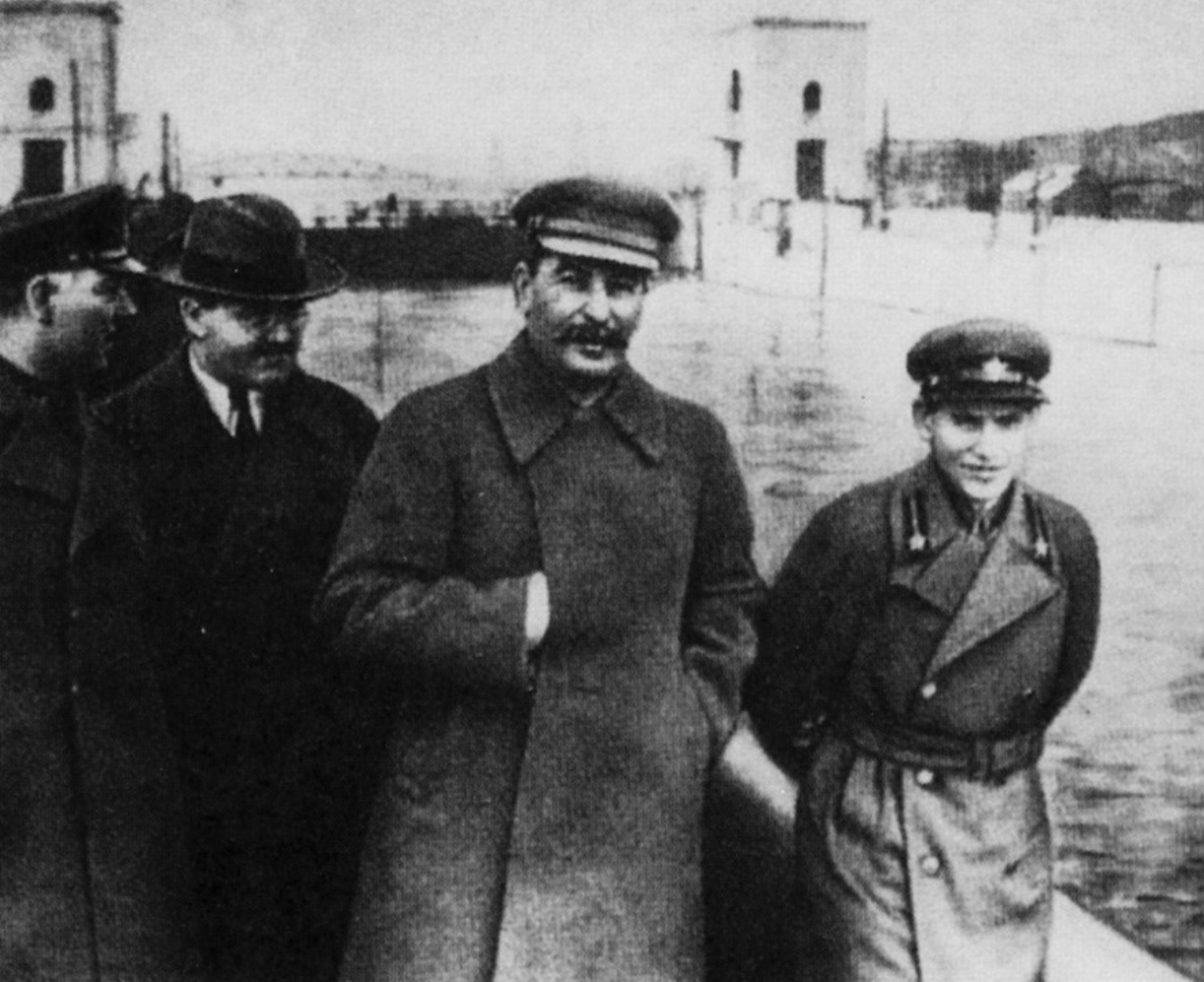

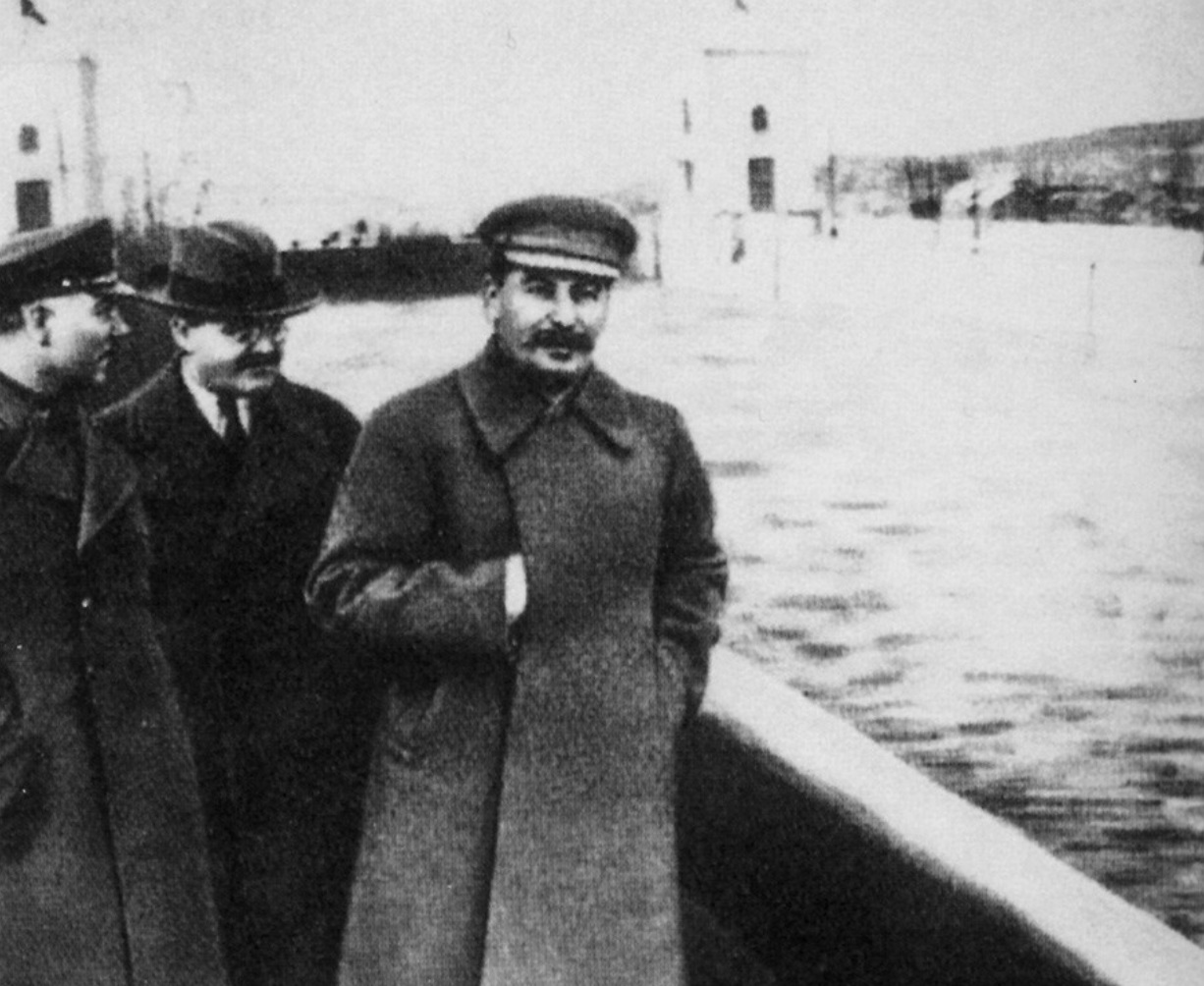
Nikolai Yezhov, the man to the right of Joseph Stalin was shot in 1940. He was edited out from the photo by Soviet censors. Such retouching was a common occurrence during Stalin's reign.

=== Soviet Union ===
Independent journalism did not exist in the Soviet Union until Mikhail Gorbachev became its leader; all reporting was directed by the Communist Party. Pravda, the predominant newspaper in the Soviet Union, had a near-monopoly. Foreign newspapers were available only if they were published by communist parties sympathetic to the Soviet Union.

=== Uruguay ===
In 1973, a military coup took power in Uruguay, and the state employed censorship. For example, writer Eduardo Galeano was imprisoned and later was forced to flee. His book Open Veins of Latin America was banned by the right-wing military government, not only in Uruguay, but also in Chile and Argentina.

=== European Union ===
In the 2022 Russian invasion of Ukraine, strategic use of censorship by the European Union has blocked the Russian government-owned media outlets Sputnik and Russia Today at multiple levels and platforms. Studies show these two channels have been a disinformation tool at the discretion of the Kremlin for years. In turn, Putin has blocked foreign and domestic press as well as Twitter and Facebook through legislation punishing what the government labels as disinformation with long prison sentences. Oriol Navarro and Astrid Wagner from the Institute of Philosophy (IFS-CSIC) suggest that this censorship poses a danger to freedom of expression and that the term “disinformation” can be easily used to legitimize the suppression of dissent in an analogue to the use of the word “terrorism”.

=== United States ===
Many countries' campaign finance laws restrict speech on candidates and political issues. In Citizens United v. FEC, the United States Supreme Court found that many such restrictions are an unconstitutional form of censorship.

=== Other ===
- Censorship in China#Political
- Censorship in Nepal#Political Censorship
- Censorship in North Korea

== Historical ==
Over the course of history, many nations and political organisations have utilised political censorship and propaganda in order to manipulate the public. The Ancien régime, for example, is well known for having implemented censorship.

In 1851, Napoleon III declared himself emperor. The wealthier citizens immediately saw in him a way to protect their privileges, that were put in danger by the French Revolution of 1848, which threatened to re-organise the social hierarchy. This was a time when all sorts of cultural productions was censored, from newspapers to plays.

== See also ==
- Ideological repression
- Indoctrination
- Internet filter#Religious, anti-religious, and political censorship
- Cordon sanitaire (politics)
- List of banned political parties
- Politically exposed person
- Political bias
- Political commissar
- Political cleansing of population
- Political prisoner
- Political repression of cyber-dissidents
- Propaganda
- De-banking
- Systematic ideology
- Supremacism
