= Rankovićism =

Political ideology

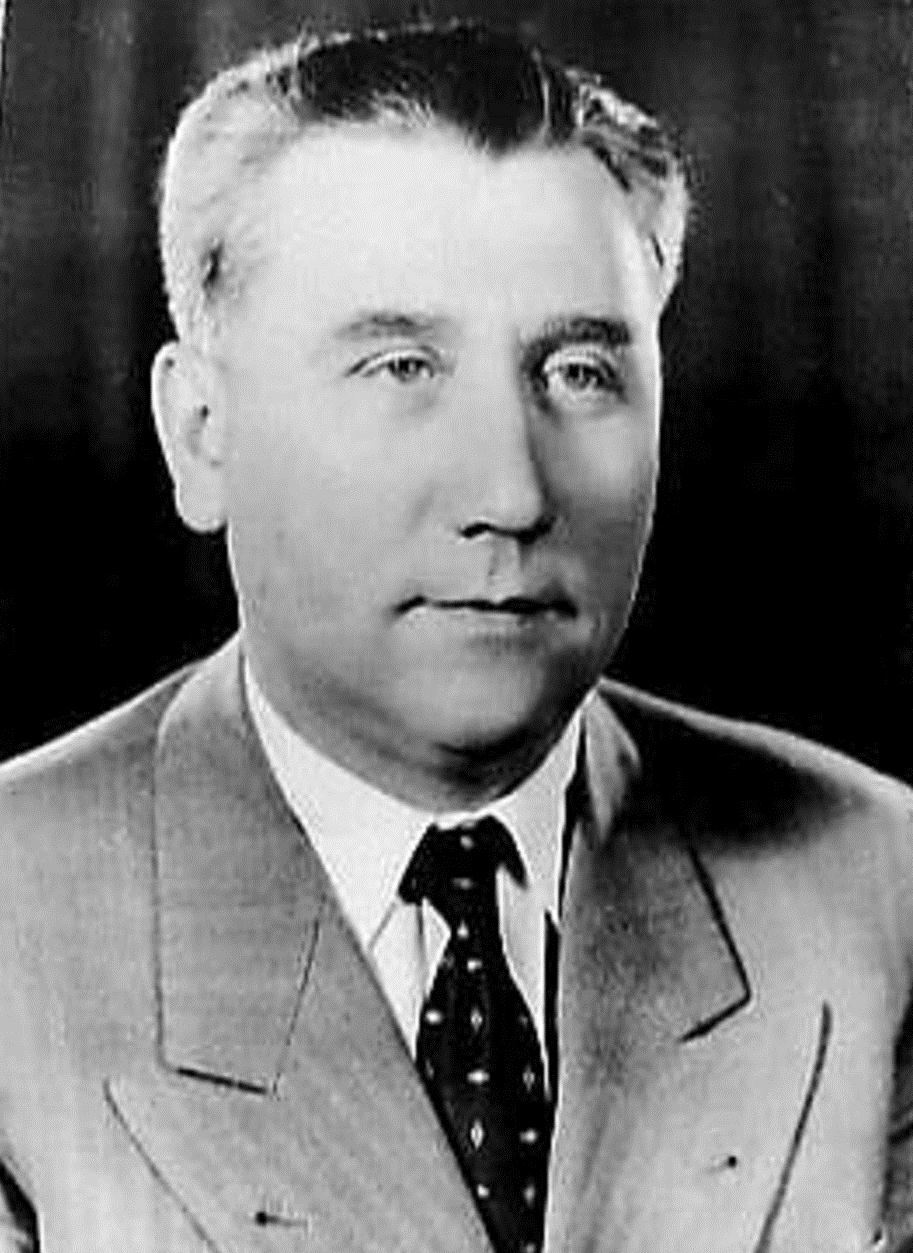
Aleksandar Ranković, Yugoslav communist politician

Rankovićism refers to a political ideology prevalent in the Socialist Federal Republic of Yugoslavia based on the political views of the Serbian communist official and former Yugoslav Partisan leader Aleksandar Ranković.

It promotes a centralized Yugoslavia and his opposition to decentralization of powers to the constituent republics that he deemed would jeopardize both the unity of Yugoslavia and the unity of Serbs. Rankovićism was commonly used as a pejorative term in Yugoslavia following his forcible political removal, and became taboo in the country after the 1960s due to its negative connotations. However, there were people who sought to redeem Ranković's legacy in the public's eyes, such as Dobrica Ćosić. Milovan Đilas said that "Ranković should be rehabilitated immediately" and said that "he did not deserve the harsh measures that were taken against him".

== Overview ==
For many years Ranković was in Josip Broz Tito's inner circle. Ranković was removed from office due to pressure from his opponents, who accused him of promoting Serb hegemonism in Yugoslavia. The ousting of Ranković resulted in the rise to power of proponents of decentralization, and a massive overhaul of the constitution of Yugoslavia in 1974 that decentralized much power to the republics and gave Kosovo and Vojvodina almost the same level of power as the republics.

The popularity of Ranković's policies in Serbia was apparent at his funeral in 1983 when large numbers of people attended the funeral. Many considered Ranković a Serbian "national" leader. By the early 1980s, many anti-Titoists invoked Ranković as their cause célèbre. They alleged that the ouster of Ranković was a symbol of Titoism's subjugation of Serbia. Ranković's policies have been perceived as the basis of the policies of Slobodan Milošević from the 1980s.

== Specific policies and legacy ==
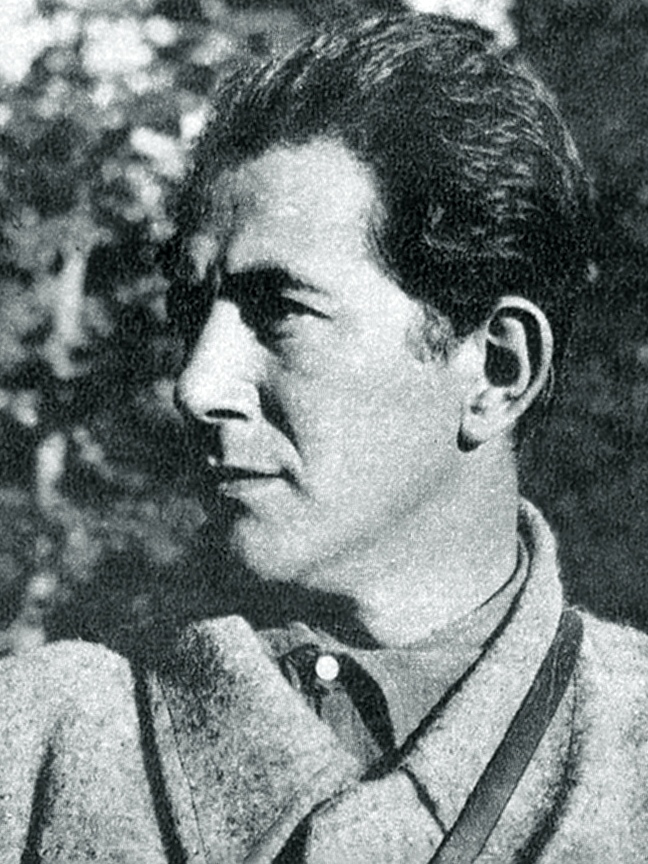
Milovan Đilas, Montenegrin politician and a former Yugoslav Partisan leadership figure, defended Ranković's reputation and said that "Ranković should be rehabilitated immediately", believing that Ranković had been maltreated.

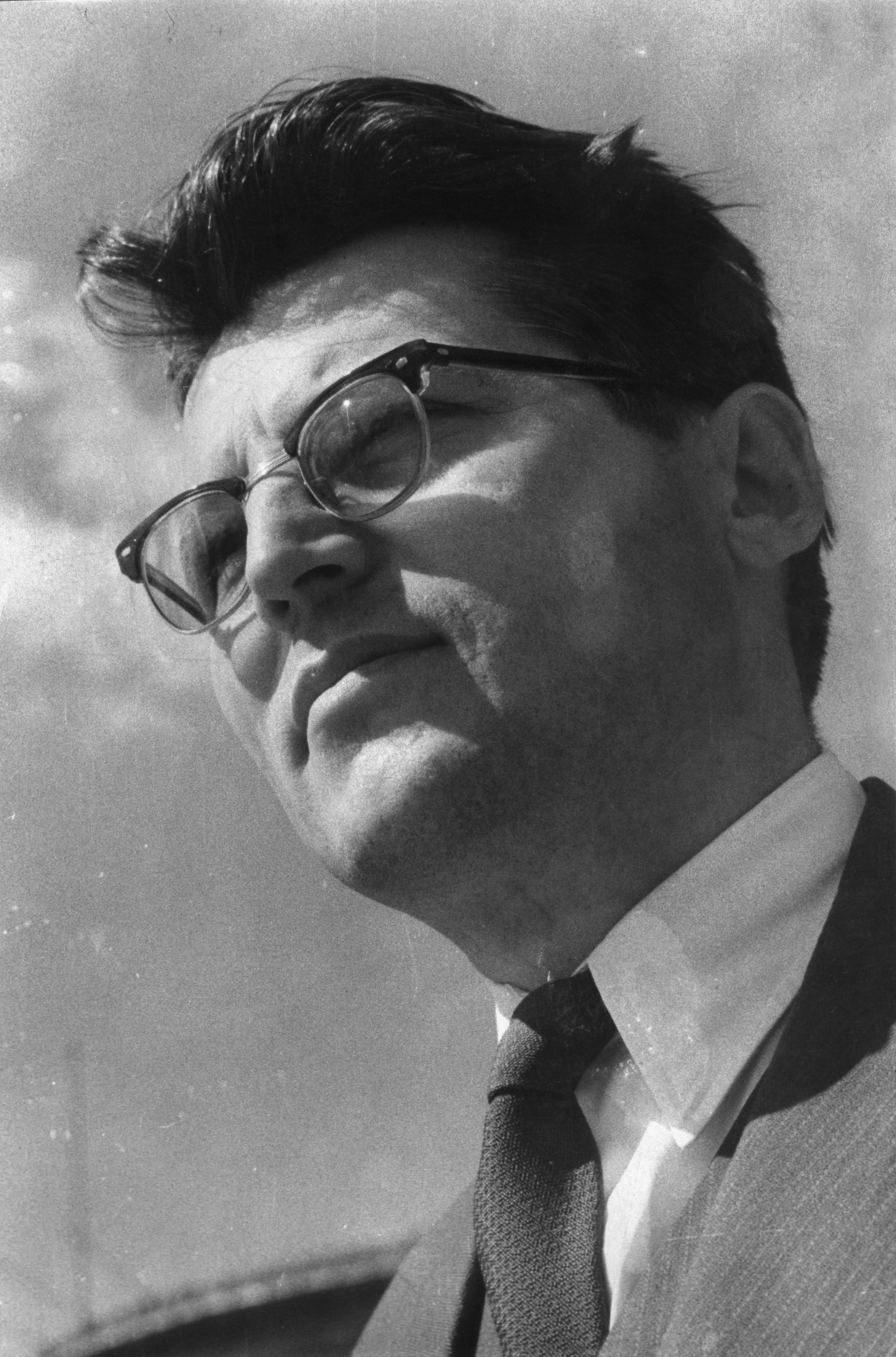
Dobrica Ćosić Serbian writer and politician, President of the Federal Republic of Yugoslavia (1992–1993). Ćosić has strongly supported the policies of Aleksandar Ranković.

Ranković sought to secure the position of Serbs and Montenegrins in Kosovo, they dominated the government, security forces, and industrial employment in Kosovo. Ranković, as head of Yugoslavia's UDBA security forces, supported a hardline approach towards Albanians in Kosovo who were commonly accused of pursuing seditious activities, including separatism, and were persecuted due to these allegations.

President Tito granted the security forces of Ranković the task to bring Albanians under control. Ranković supported a centralised Soviet style system. He was against the Albanian population gaining further autonomy in Kosovo and Ranković had misgivings and a strong dislike of Albanians. Kosovo was seen by Ranković as a security threat for the country and its unity.

Following the Yugoslav-Soviet Union split (1948), local Albanians were viewed by the state as possible collaborators of pro-Soviet Albania and consequently Kosovo became an area of focus for the secret service and police force under Ranković. During Ranković's campaign, members of the Albanian intelligentsia were targeted, whereas thousands of other Albanians underwent trials and were jailed for "Stalinism". Ranković was one of Tito's close political and influential associates that oversaw the purges of communists accused of being pro-Stalin following the Soviet-Yugoslav split. The secret police operating in Macedonia, Montenegro and Serbia were under the full control of Ranković, unlike in Bosnia, Croatia and Slovenia, due to national tensions in the organisation. Ranković was considered as a figure of conservative political elements within Yugoslavia that did not favour democratisation or reform.

Between 1945 and 1966, Ranković upheld Serbian minority control of mainly Albanian inhabited Kosovo through repressive anti-Albanian policies by the secret police. In Kosovo, the period 1947-1966 is colloquially known as "the Ranković era". During this time, Kosovo became a police state under Ranković and his secret police force. Policies promoted by Serb nationalists were employed against Albanians by Ranković that involved terrorisation and harassment. These efforts were undertaken through the pretense of illegal weapons searches or police actions that involved torture and the death of alleged and real political opponents, often referred to as "irredentists". To a lesser extent, Ranković also undertook similar campaigns toward the Hungarians of Vojvodina and Muslims of Sandžak. Ranković along with other Serb communist members opposed the recognition of Bosniak nationality.

Kosovo, under the control of Ranković was viewed by Turkey as the individual that would implement "the Gentleman's Agreement", a deal reached between Tito and Turkish foreign minister Mehmet Fuat Köprülü in 1953 that promoted Albanian emigration to Anatolia. Factors involved in the upsurge of migration were intimidation and pressure toward the Albanian population to leave through a campaign headed by Ranković that officially was stated as aimed at curbing Albanian nationalism. Islam in Kosovo by this time was repressed, and both Albanians and Muslim South Slavs were encouraged to declare themselves to be Turks. Large numbers of Albanians and Sandžak Muslims left Yugoslavia for Turkey, whereas Montenegrin and Serb families were installed in Kosovo during the period under Ranković. Opposition grew to his rigid policies on Kosovo and also for policies undertaken in Croatia and Slovenia. Ranković's power and agenda waned in the 1960s with the rise to power of reformers who sought decentralization and to preserve the right of national self-determination of the peoples of Yugoslavia.

In response to his opposition to decentralization, the Yugoslav government removed Ranković from office in 1966 on various claims, including that he was spying on Tito. The process began with Tito ordering the investigation of the UDBA; however, one of the most vocal and outspoken condemnations of Ranković came from members within the League of Communists of Serbia, specifically the League of Communists of Kosovo, that was considered too extreme of a condemnation by Tito, who held them in dismay, and was deeply unpopular amongst Serbs, who in general were supportive of Ranković. Its report declared that the security forces in Kosovo under the leadership of Ranković actively persecuted those of Albanian nationality and said that "the ideological foundation of such policy under the competence of Serbia is nationalism and chauvinism." Upon listening at a meeting to the claims of Ranković's abuse of power and abuse of Albanians as reported by Veli Deva, the Secretary of Kosovo's Regional Committee, Mihailo Švabić, a Serbian member of the LCS Central Committee, famously said that he was "ashamed - as a communist, as a Serb, and as a man - as I listened to the presentation of comrade Deva". Serbian Communist Spasenija Babović called for Ranković to be expelled from the party, and the LCS Central Committee agreed to this request.

Following his dismissal, the government repression under Ranković in Kosovo toward Albanians was revealed, and his patriotic pursuit to secure the region was debunked. Albanians gained wider freedom in Yugoslavia as a consequence of the downfall of Ranković. The removal of Ranković was positively received by Albanians and some other Yugoslavs, whereas it generated concerns within Yugoslavia that Serbs would become vulnerable and lack protection in Kosovo. Tito made a visit to Kosovo (spring 1967) and admitted to mistakes having been made in previous years.

Serbs were furious with the ouster of Ranković, considering the ouster of Ranković as an attack on Serbia. Serbian supporters of Ranković protested and said claims such as "all of this was directed at Serbia" and that "Serbia no longer has a representative who will represent its interests", and adopting slogans such as "Serbia is endangered" and that "the best people in Serbia are leaving". Serb nationalists within the communist party warned Tito that the removal of Ranković was an unforgivable offense to Serbs in the country as he represented Serbia. For a faction within the Serbian communist party that aimed toward state centralisation, Ranković was viewed as a defender of Serb interests. Perspectives on Ranković among Kosovo Serbs was hope for a return to conditions of the time, as he represented order and peace. For Kosovo Albanians, Ranković became a symbol that represented misery and suffering, as they associated him with negative actions toward them.

After the ouster of Ranković in 1966, the agenda of pro-decentralization reformers in Yugoslavia, especially from Slovenia and Croatia, succeeded in the late 1960s in attaining substantial decentralization of powers, creating substantial autonomy in Kosovo and Vojvodina, and recognizing a Muslim Yugoslav (now called Bosniak) nationality.

As the Albanian-Serb ethnic conflict in Kosovo accelerated beginning in 1981, Serbs began to openly refer to the Ranković-era as an ideal time and Serbs adopted Ranković as a hero figure. During the Albanian-Serb unrest, Serbs claimed "we need another Ranković". After Ranković's death in 1983, his funeral was attended by over 100,000 people who chanted his name, and turned the event into a nationalist demonstration. Serbian nationalists supported Ranković, such as Dobrica Ćosić, who noted that Ranković's funeral in 1983, where Serbs praised Ranković, was "above all a nationalist demonstration. It was a true, widely effective gesture, a real nationalist uprising [of] solidarity with a Serbian communist who was a victim of a great injustice." Ćosić since the early 1980s wrote works that praised Ranković and said that Ranković was respected by Serbian peasantry, saying "While the intellectuals and the entire party bureaucracy and the entire party bureaucracy believed it was good that Ranković fell, the peasants saw him as a man who defended Yugoslavia and represented Serbia at the head of the party, convinced that he was an honorable and statesmanlike man."

In 1986, a movement known as the Kosovo Committee of Serbs and Montenegrins was founded that promoted the restoration of Ranković-era policies. The Committee claimed that Albanians were committing "genocide" against Serbs and Montenegrins, demanded a wholescale purge of Albanian leaders, and claimed that the alleged persecution of Serbs required the Yugoslav military to intervene and establish military rule in Kosovo. The Committee organized mass protests and held support amongst Serb Communist cadres who had been removed from office following the ouster of Ranković, amongst other supporters. Later in 1986 these events and perceptions culminated in the SANU memorandum written by various Serbian Communist officials that accused Tito and Kardelj of having attempted to "destroy Serbia".

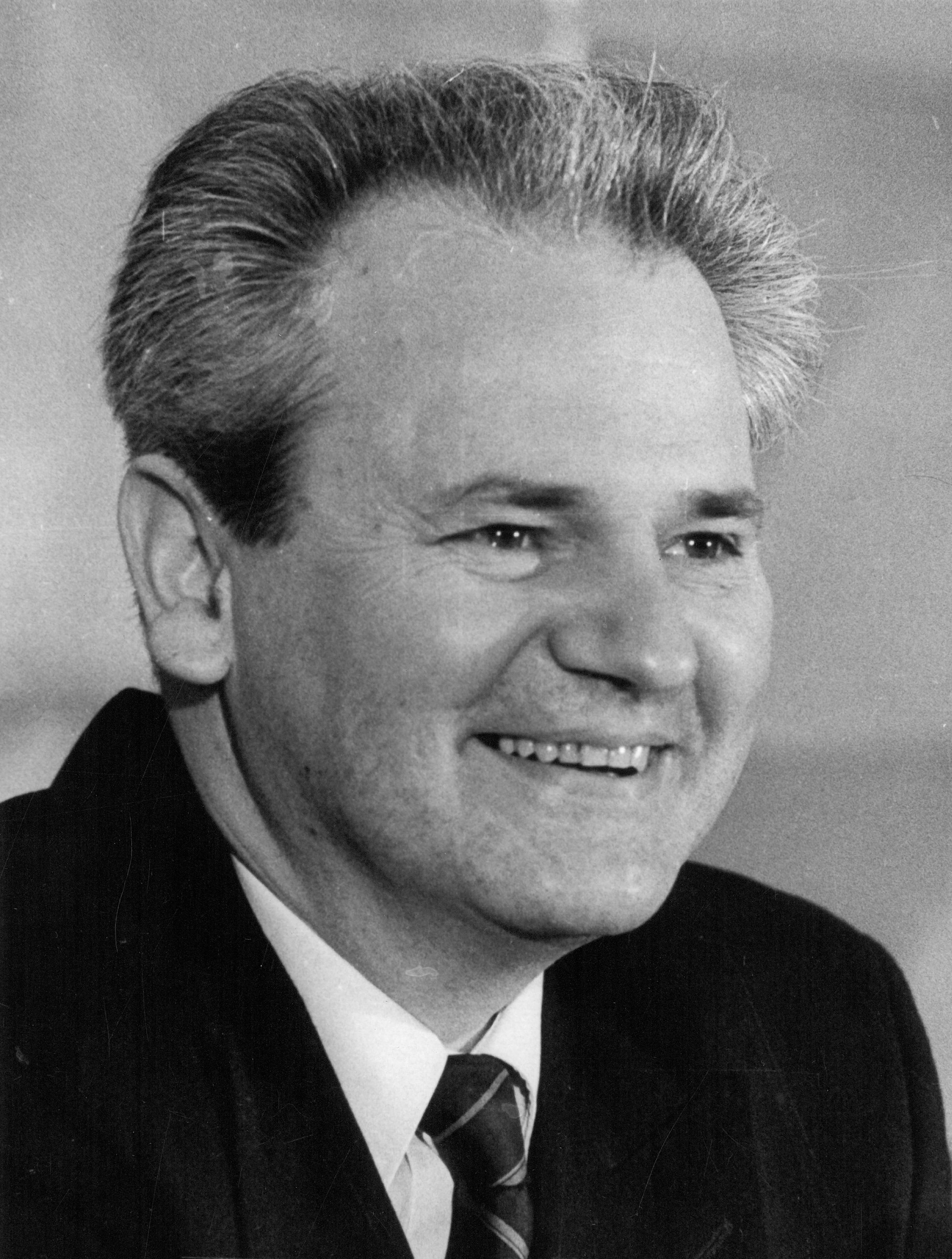
Slobodan Milošević, President of Serbia (1989–1997), President of the Federal Republic of Yugoslavia (1997–2000)

Slobodan Milošević has been regarded as having been influenced by the politics surrounding Ranković. Milošević's close friend Jagoš Đuretić has claimed that Milošević was personally "baffled" by the magnitude of nationalist outpouring at Ranković's private funeral services, as Ranković had been previously assumed amongst Communist officials to have been politically destroyed and discredited by his ouster in 1966. Đuretić says that the observation of Ranković's funeral made a deep impression on Milošević. The rise of Milošević to power in Serbia was regarded in Yugoslavia as "bringing Ranković back in", as Milošević opposed the 1974 Constitution that had decentralized Yugoslavia from its previous centralized nature when Ranković held influence in the Yugoslav government. Milošević declared in his inauguration speech as Serbian President in 1989 that the 1974 Constitution was obsolete, that he opposed its decentralized nature and demanded a new constitution whereby only a small number of issues would require consensus by all the republics, and that a centralized sovereignty should be exercised by the Yugoslav federation as a whole, and not within its individual republics.

Milošević's wife Mira Marković, as well as Milošević's major supporter, the Yugoslav Defense Secretary General Veljko Kadijević, identified Yugoslavia's problems as beginning in the 1962-1966 period, the same time period in which Ranković's influence in the government decreased and finally with his ousting from office in 1966. Mica Sparavelo, who had been a lieutenant to Ranković as UDBA chief, was a key Serb figure in the Kosovo Committee of Serbs and Montenegrins and supported Milošević's rise to power. By rehabilitating Ranković's legacy, Milošević won support amongst many Serbs.
