= Ideological repression =

Forceful activities against competing ideologies and philosophies

Ideological repression refers to forceful activities against competing ideologies and philosophies.

Alan Wolfe defines ideological repression as "the attempt to manipulate people's consciousness so they accept the ruling ideology, and distrust and refuse to be moved by competing ideologies".

In the early days of the Soviet Union and in other countries, ideological repression was carried out by political repression of the carriers of competing ideologies.

Instruments of ideological repression are propaganda and censorship. During the days of "Marxism–Leninism" in the Soviet Union – around the early 1930s – students of this particular school of thought were given textbooks that encouraged one particular way of thinking (the Marxist way) as being paramount and the most scientific and true school of thought.

Through ideological repression and control of output information, the Soviet Union was attempting to keep social revolutions at bay.

== See also ==
- Academic bias
- Ideological repression in the Soviet Union
- Political censorship
- Political correctness
