= Milovan Djilas =

Yugoslav politician (1911–1995)

- Milovan Đilas; Милован Ђилас
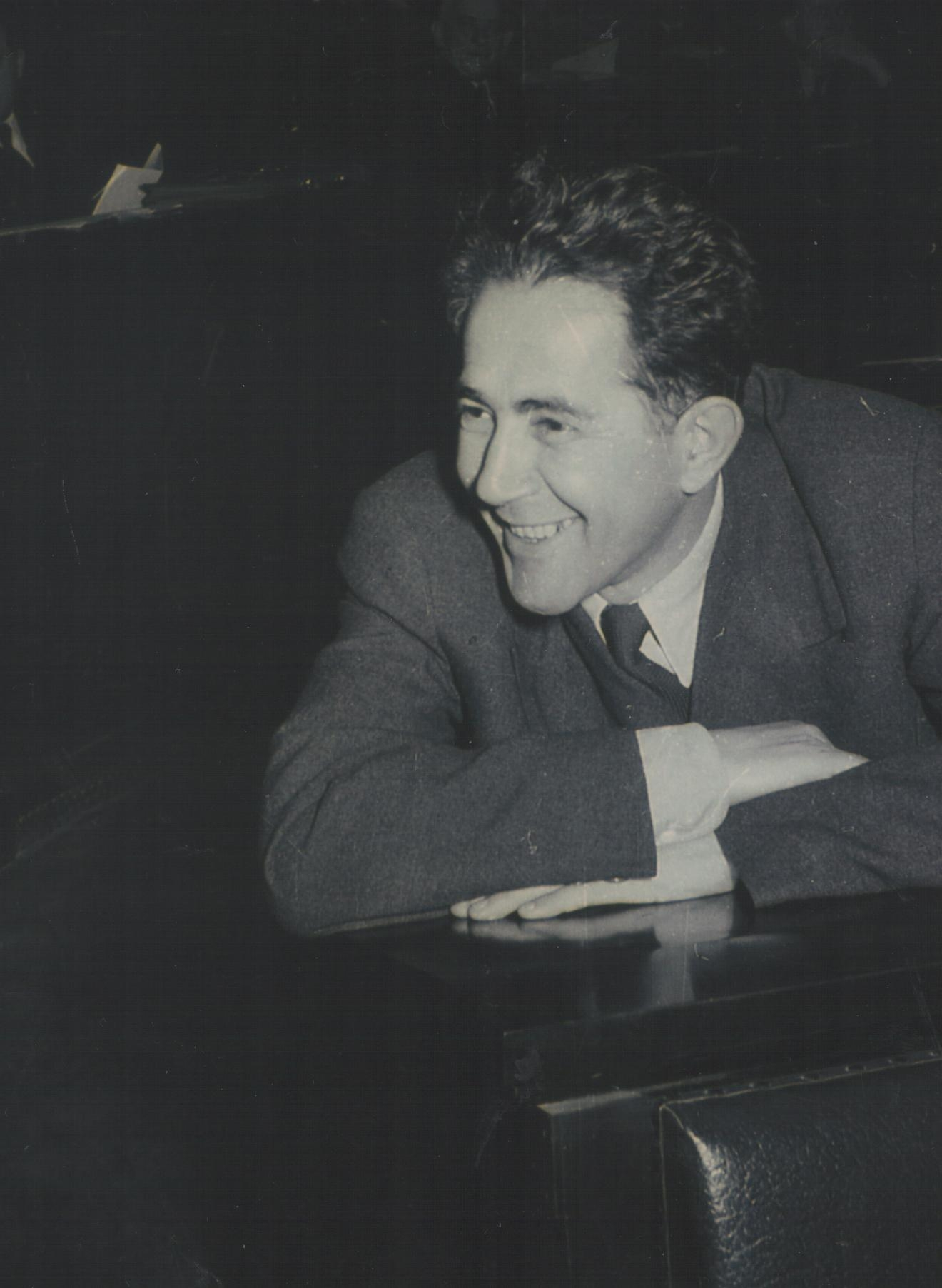
- Djilas in 1950

President of the Federal People's Assembly of Yugoslavia
- In office 25 December 1953 – 28 January 1954
- Preceded by: Vladimir Simić
- Succeeded by: Moša Pijade

Deputy Prime Minister of Yugoslavia
- In office 14 January 1953 – 17 January 1954
- Prime Minister: Josip Broz Tito
- Preceded by: Blagoje Nešković
- Succeeded by: Svetozar Vukmanović

Minister without portfolio of Yugoslavia
- In office 2 February 1946 – 14 January 1953
- Prime Minister: Josip Broz Tito

Minister for Montenegro in the Government of Yugoslavia
- In office 7 March 1945 – 17 April 1945
- Prime Minister: Josip Broz Tito
- Preceded by: Position established
- Succeeded by: Blažo Jovanović (as Prime Minister of Montenegro)

Personal details
- Born: 12 June 1911 Podbišće, Montenegro
- Died: 20 April 1995 (aged 83) Belgrade, FR Yugoslavia
- Resting place: Podbišće, Montenegro
- Party: League of Communists of Yugoslavia (1932–1954)
- Spouses: Mitra Mitrović (m. 1936; div. 1952) Stefanija Barić (m. 1952; died 1993)
- Children: Vukica; Aleksa
- Education: University of Belgrade
- Occupation: Politician; theorist; writer

Military service
- Allegiance: Yugoslavia
- Branch/service: Yugoslav Partisans; Yugoslav People's Army
- Years of service: 1941–1957
- Rank: Colonel general
- Battles/wars: World War II in Yugoslavia
- Awards: Order of National Liberation (1945); Order of the People's Hero (1953)

Philosophical work
- Era: 20th-century philosophy
- Region: Western philosophy Yugoslav philosophy
- School: Marxism; Djilasism
- Main interests: Political philosophy
- Notable ideas: New class

Milovan Djilas (Serbo-Croatian: Milovan Đilas / Милован Ђилас, pronounced [mîlɔʋan dʑîlaːs]; 12 June 1911 – 20 April 1995) was a Yugoslav communist politician, theorist and author. He was a key figure in the Partisan movement during World War II, as well as in the post-war government. A self-identified democratic socialist, Djilas became one of the best-known and most prominent dissidents in Yugoslavia and all of Eastern Europe.

== Early life and revolutionary activities ==
Milovan Djilas was born in Podbišće near Mojkovac in the Kingdom of Montenegro on 12 June 1911, into a peasant family. He was the fourth of nine children. His father Nikola, a recipient of the Obilić Medal for bravery, served in the Montenegrin Army during the Balkan Wars of 1912–1913, then World War I, after which he was awarded the Albanian Commemorative Medal. After that war he commanded the gendarmerie in Kolašin, and opposed the incorporation of Montenegro into the Kingdom of Serbs, Croats and Slovenes. His paternal grandfather, Aleksa, was an anti-Ottoman bandit leader, known as a hajduk, who was apparently assassinated at the direction of the Montenegrin king's father-in-law. Djilas's mother, Novka, was from Siberia in the Russian Empire. During World War II, Djilas's sister Dobrinka was murdered by the Chetniks and his father was killed during a battle with the Balli Kombëtar in Kosovo.

Djilas was educated in Podbišće, Kolašin and Berane. He was exposed to literature during his schooling, and also to the works of Karl Marx and Vladimir Lenin. He commenced studying literature at the University of Belgrade in 1929, by which time he was already a committed communist. In 1929, the name of the country changed to the Kingdom of Yugoslavia. Djilas was a radical student activist and opposed the dictatorship of King Alexander I. This brought him to the attention of the police; in March 1932 he was arrested for taking part in an anti-government demonstration and was jailed for eight days as a warning. Eleven months later, having not changed his ways, Djilas was again arrested, but this time he was tortured then sentenced to three years imprisonment in the Sremska Mitrovica Prison. While in jail he met several senior members of the Communist Party of Yugoslavia (Serbo-Croatian Latin: Komunistička partija Jugoslavije, KPJ), including Moša Pijade and Aleksandar Ranković. He was further radicalised while in jail, becoming a committed Stalinist.

After his release from prison in 1936, Djilas decided to give up his study of literature and concentrate on revolutionary activities with the KPJ. When the leader of the Soviet Union, Josef Stalin, tried to gain greater control of the KPJ, Djilas aligned himself with the general secretary of the KPJ, Josip Broz Tito. Djilas also helped recruit about 1,500 Yugoslav volunteers to fight on the Republican side in the Spanish Civil War, but Tito would not permit him to travel to Spain to take part in the war as he needed him in Yugoslavia. In 1938, Tito appointed him to the Central Committee of the KPJ, and to its politburo the following year.

== World War II ==
=== Uprising in Montenegro ===
In April 1941, Axis powers Nazi Germany, Fascist Italy and the Kingdom of Hungary invaded Yugoslavia and quickly defeated her armed forces. Yugoslavia was partitioned, and as part of this, most of modern Montenegro was subjected to military occupation by the Italians, who installed a civil commissioner. Initially the Italians were lenient towards the Montenegrins, but local people quickly developed grievances against them, relating to expulsions of Montenegrin people from elsewhere in occupied Yugoslavia, an influx of Serb refugees fleeing Ustaše persecution in the neighboring Independent State of Croatia, loss of traditionally Montenegrin territory and financial restrictions imposed on them.

Around 400 former Yugoslav Army officers returned to Montenegro, along with many non-commissioned officers, civil administrators and KPJ members. During the invasion, the Yugoslav Zeta Division, composed mostly of Montenegrins, had briefly counter-attacked into Albania, but had largely returned home with their weapons and equipment following the Yugoslav surrender.

Djilas helped Josip Broz Tito to establish the Yugoslav Partisan resistance and became a guerrilla commander during the war following Germany's attack on the Soviet Union on 22 June 1941 (Operation Barbarossa) when the Communist Party of Yugoslavia's (KPJ) Central Committee decided that conditions had been created for armed struggle.

On 4 July, the KPJ passed the resolution to begin the uprising. Djilas was sent to Montenegro to organize and raise the struggle against the Italian occupying force, which on 12 July 1941 proclaimed the fascist puppet entity Kingdom of Montenegro, to be run by Sekula Drljević and closely controlled by the Italian authority of Alessandro Biroli, Mussolini's confidant. Djilas had an important role in the Uprising in Montenegro which was a national example, spanning ideological lines. Large parts of Montenegro were quickly liberated. Djilas remained in Montenegro until November.

=== Borba ===
In early November 1941, Tito dismissed Djilas from the command of Partisan forces in Montenegro because of his mistakes during the uprising, including what were called his "leftist errors". Tito emphasized that Djilas made mistakes because he organized a frontal struggle of armies against a much stronger enemy, instead of connecting the Partisan struggle with the people's uprising, and adopting the Partisan methods of resistance. Djilas was appointed as editor of the paper Borba, the Party's main propaganda organ.

Djilas left for the communist-controlled town of Užice in Serbia, where he took up his work for Borba. Following the withdrawal of Supreme Commander Tito and other Party leaders to Bosnia, Djilas stayed in Nova Varoš in the Raška (on the border between Serbia and Montenegro). From there he retreated with the units under his command, in the middle of winter and in difficult conditions, to join the Supreme Staff. At this time, the Partisans did not have serious divisions between communists and non-communists.

=== Civil war and state-building ===
In March 1942, Djilas returned to Montenegro, where a civil war between Partisans and Chetniks had broken out. The historian Momčilo Cemović, who has dealt mostly with this period of Djilas's war activities, believed that the CPY Central Committee and the Supreme Staff had sent Djilas to ascertain the actual state of affairs and to dismiss the communist leaders responsible.

In March 1944, he went as part of the military- and party-mission to the Soviet Union. During this time he met with Georgi Dimitrov, Vyacheslav Molotov and Joseph Stalin, among others.

Returning to Yugoslavia, he fought with the Partisans to liberate Belgrade from the Wehrmacht. With the establishment of the Federal People's Republic of Yugoslavia, Djilas became vice-president in Tito's government. Djilas later claimed to have been sent at that time to pressure the Italians to withdraw from Istria.

Djilas was sent to Moscow to meet Stalin again in 1948 to try and bridge the gap between Moscow and Belgrade. He became one of the leading critics of attempts by Stalin to bring Yugoslavia under greater control by Moscow. Later that year, Yugoslavia broke with the Soviet Union and left the Cominform, ushering in the Informbiro period.

Initially the Yugoslav communists, despite the break with Stalin, remained as hard line as before. But they began to pursue a policy of independent socialism that experimented with self-management of workers in state-run enterprises. Djilas was very much part of that, but he began to take things further. Having responsibility for propaganda, he created a platform for new ideas and he launched a new journal, Nova Misao ("New Thought"), in which he published a series of articles that were increasingly freethinking.

== Dissident ==
Djilas was widely regarded as Tito's possible successor and in 1953 he was about to be chosen as President of Yugoslavia. He became President of the Federal People's Assembly of Yugoslavia, but he only held office from 25 December 1953 to 28 January 1954. Between October 1953 and January 1954, he wrote 19 articles (only 18 were published) for Borba, the official newspaper of the League of Communists of Yugoslavia, wherein, encouraged by Tito, he developed the Yugoslav critique of over-bureaucratic Stalinism in the Soviet Union, in favour of a shift away from central planning towards more economic autonomy.

His advocacy of greater democratic input into decision-making led him eventually to argue against the one-party state itself, suggesting a relaxation of party discipline, and the retirement of the state officials he saw as profiteering from their position and blocking the road to further reform. At that point, Tito and other leading Yugoslav communists saw Djilas's arguments as a threat to their leadership. In January 1954, Djilas was expelled from the Central Committee of the party, of which he had been a member since 1937, and dismissed from all political functions for his criticism. He resigned from the League of Communists soon afterwards, in March 1954. On 25 December 1954, he gave an interview to The New York Times in which he characterized the situation in Yugoslavia as "totalitarian", adding that his country was ruled by "undemocratic forces" and "reactionary elements". He also appealed for the formation of "a new democratic Socialist party", and thus for a two-party system. For this "hostile propaganda" he was brought to trial and given an 18-month suspended prison sentence.

On 19 November 1956, Djilas was arrested following his statement to Agence France Presse opposing the Yugoslav abstention in the United Nations vote condemning Soviet intervention in Hungary and his article to The New Leader magazine supporting the Hungarian Revolution. He was sentenced to three years imprisonment. In 1957, Djilas published abroad The New Class: An Analysis of the Communist System, which he had already sent to the American publisher Praeger before he was jailed. In the book he argued that communism in Soviet Union and Eastern Europe was not egalitarian, and that it was establishing a new class of privileged party bureaucracy, who enjoyed material benefits from their positions. The book was a great success and was translated into more than 40 languages. For The New Class, Djilas was sentenced in 1957 to another seven years imprisonment, or ten in all, taking into account his previous term.

In prison, Djilas completed a massive scholarly biography of the great Montenegrin prince-poet-priest Njegoš as well as fictional novels (Montenegro) and short stories. In 1958, he published abroad the first volume of his memoirs, about his youth in Montenegro, entitled Land Without Justice, which he had finished in 1954, but was rejected by Yugoslav publishers. In this book, Djilas described the Šahovići massacre, a massacre of the Muslim population of the Yugoslav village of Šahovići (modern-day Tomaševo in Montenegro) and its neighboring area on 9–10 November 1924 by a mob of 2,000 Orthodox Christian men from Kolašin and Bijelo Polje who sought revenge for the earlier murder of Boško Bošković. The description was based on the testimony of his father Nikola, who participated in the massacre.

Djilas was conditionally released on 20 January 1961, after completing four years and two months in prison. During 1961, Djilas was repeatedly threatened by the Yugoslav government of being sent back to jail for his contacts with foreign journalists and scholars. The Italian magazine Tempo Presente which featured one of his short stories entitled The War was banned in the country. He would be imprisoned again in April 1962 for publishing abroad Conversations with Stalin, which became another international success and which Djilas personally considered his greatest work (see Rise and Fall). Conversations with Stalin was written in 1961 after his release, although it had long been on his mind before (Rise and Fall, p. 396). The manuscript was not smuggled out of prison, as it has been stated, including by David Pryce-Jones in "Remembering Milovan Djilas". For Conversations with Stalin, Djilas was sentenced in August 1962 to another five years – or fifteen, added to the earlier punishments – allegedly for having "revealed state secrets", which he denied. The book's references to Albania and its possible union with Yugoslavia were considered embarrassing by Yugoslav communist leaders. During his internment, Djilas also translated John Milton's Paradise Lost into Serbo-Croatian by utilizing toilet paper. On 31 December 1966, Djilas was granted amnesty and freed unconditionally after four years in jail. He was never to be imprisoned again. He continued as a dissident, living in Belgrade until his death on 20 April 1995.

== Views on the breakup of Yugoslavia and the Soviet Union ==
Djilas opposed the breakup of Yugoslavia and the descent into nationalist conflict in the 1980s and 1990s, but predicted in the 1980s that a breakup would happen. In 1981, he predicted that this would happen on ethnic and bureaucratic nationalist lines due to the loss of Tito:

"Our system was built only for Tito to manage. Now that Tito is gone and our economic situation becomes critical, there will be a natural tendency for greater centralization of power. But this centralization will not succeed because it will run up against the ethnic-political power bases in the republics. This is not classical nationalism but a more dangerous, bureaucratic nationalism built on economic self-interest. This is how the Yugoslav system will begin to collapse."

He was critical of Serbian President Slobodan Milošević in the late 1980s and predicted that his actions would arouse separation of other republics, ethnic war, and the demise of Yugoslavia:

"Milošević still has possibilities.... The liberalization you see has a bad cause. It is the consequence of national competition between Serbia and the other republics. Eventually Yugoslavia might be like the British Commonwealth, a loose confederation of trading nations. But first, I am afraid, there will be national wars and rebellions. There is such strong hate here."

"Milošević's authoritarianism in Serbia is provoking real separation. Remember what Hegel said, that history repeats itself as tragedy and farce. What I mean to say is that when Yugoslavia disintegrates this time around, the outside world will not intervene as it did in 1914.... Yugoslavia is the laboratory of all Communism. Its disintegration will foretell the disintegration in the Soviet Union. We are further along than the Soviets."

In 1987, Djilas was interviewed by the neoconservative magazine Encounter on the subject of Soviet leader Mikhail Gorbachev's economic and political reforms in the Soviet Union. Djilas described Gorbachev's actions as a "strict necessity. They have come to realize what other Communists in Yugoslavia, Poland, Hungary, Czechoslovakia and China realised much earlier—namely that Communism doesn't work. It works neither at the economic level nor at the level of satisfying essential human needs and liberties... Communism is a 19th-century relic and a prescription for disaster."

== Views on Montenegrin nationhood ==
Djilas made great contributions to Montenegrin literature and historiography with his works. Later in life, from the mid-1980s, Djilas referred to himself as "Serb" (as does his Belgrade-born son Aleksa, research associate at the Russian Research Center, Harvard University). After he left the party, Djilas denied there existed a separate Montenegrin ethnicity and national identity, especially in his books Njegoš: Poet-Prince-Bishop and Rise and Fall.

== Cultural references ==
Djilas was a contributor for the 1992 Radio Television of Serbia documentary series entitled Yugoslavia in War 1941–1945. Djilas is mentioned in Saul Bellow's fiction Humboldt's Gift, where he writes about Joseph Stalin's "twelve-course all-night banquets" and the theme of boredom.

== Works ==
- Lenin on relations between socialist states, 1949.
- The New Class: An Analysis of the Communist System, New York: Frederick A. Praeger, Inc., 1957.
- Land without Justice, 1958.
- Conversations with Stalin, London: Rupert Hart-Davis 1962.
- Montenegro, 1963.
- The Leper and Other Stories, 1964.
- Njegoš: Poet-Prince-Bishop, 1966.
- The Unperfect Society: Beyond the New Class, 1969.
- Lost Battles, 1970.
- Under the Colors, 1971.
- The Stone and the Violets, 1972.
- Memoir of a Revolutionary, 1973.
- Parts of a Lifetime, 1975.
- Wartime, 1977.
- Tito: The Story from Inside, 1980.
- Rise and Fall, 1985.
- Of Prisons and Ideas, 1986.

=== Selected essays ===
- "Disintegration of Leninist Totalitarianism", in 1984 Revisited: Tolitarianism in Our Century, New York, Harper and Row, 1983, ed. Irving Howe
- "The Crisis of Communism". Telos 80 (Summer 1989). New York: Telos Press

=== Translations ===
- Milton, John, Paradise Lost (from the original English to Serbo-Croatian), 1969

== See also ==
- Đilasism

=== Literary subjects ===
- Communism
- John Milton
- Petar II Petrović-Njegoš
- Joseph Stalin
- Stalinism
