= Titoism =

Communist ideology

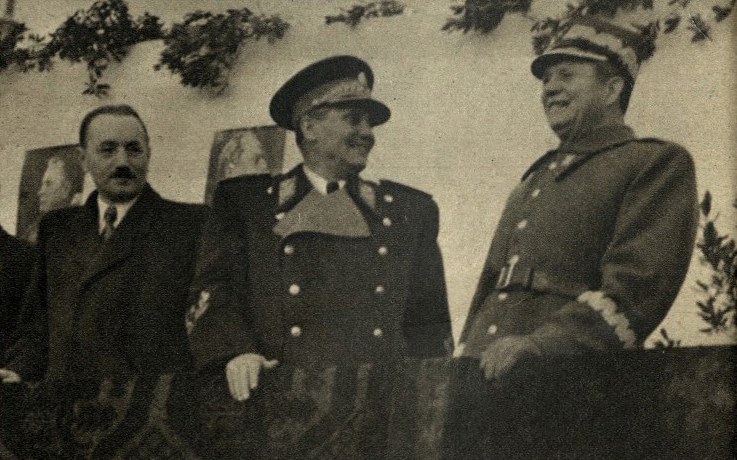
Josip Broz Tito meeting with Bolesław Bierut and Michał Żymierski from the Polish People's Republic in 1946.

Titoism is a socialist political philosophy most closely associated with Josip Broz Tito and refers to the ideology and policies of the League of Communists of Yugoslavia (LCY) during the Cold War. It is characterized by a broad Yugoslav identity, socialist workers' self-management, a political separation from the Soviet Union, and leadership in the Non-Aligned Movement.

Tito led the communist Yugoslav Partisans during World War II in Yugoslavia. After the war, tensions arose between Yugoslavia and the Soviet Union. Although these issues alleviated over time, Yugoslavia still remained largely independent in ideology and policy due to the leadership of Tito, who led Yugoslavia until his death in 1980.

Tito himself claimed he was not a Titoist; "Titoism as a separate ideological line does not exist. [...] Should Titoism become an ideological line, we would become revisionists; we would have renounced Marxism. We are Marxists; I am a Marxist, and therefore I cannot be a Titoist."

== Background ==
Initially a personal favourite of the USSR, Tito led the national liberation movement against the Nazi occupation of Yugoslavia during World War II, where the Yugoslav Partisans liberated Yugoslavia with only limited help from the Red Army. Tito met with the Soviet leadership several times immediately after the war to negotiate the future of Yugoslavia. Initially aligned with Soviet policy, over time, these negotiations became less cordial because Tito had the intention neither of handing over executive power nor of accepting foreign intervention or influence (a position Tito later continued within the Non-Aligned Movement).

The Yugoslav regime first pledged allegiance, from 1945 to 1948, to Stalinism. But according to the Trotskyist (hence anti-Stalinist) historian Jean-Jacques Marie, Stalin had planned to liquidate Tito as early as the end of the 1930s, and again after the Spanish Civil War, during which Tito participated in the recruitment and to the organization of the Dimitrov Battalion, a Balkan unit of the International Brigades, some of whose ex-combatants would be assassinated by the Soviets.

Tito's agreement with Bulgarian leader Georgi Dimitrov on Greater Yugoslavia projects, which meant to merge the two Balkan countries into a Balkan Federation, made Stalin anxious. This led to the 1947 cooperation agreement signed in Bled (Dimitrov also pressured Romania to join such a federation, expressing his beliefs during a visit to Bucharest in early 1948). The Bled agreement, also referred to as the "Tito–Dimitrov treaty", was signed 1 August 1947 in Bled, Slovenia. It foresaw also unification between Vardar Macedonia and Pirin Macedonia and return of Western Outlands to Bulgaria. The integrationist policies resulting from the agreement were terminated after the Tito–Stalin split in June 1948, when Bulgaria was being subordinated to the interests of the Soviet Union and took a stance against Yugoslavia.

The policy of regional blocs had been the norm in Comintern policies, displaying Soviet resentment of the nation states in Eastern Europe and of the consequences of Paris Peace Conference. With the 1943 dissolution of the Comintern and the subsequent advent of the Cominform came Stalin's dismissal of the previous ideology, an adaptation to the conditions created for Soviet hegemony during the Cold War.

== Tito–Stalin split ==
Moreover, Stalin did not have free rein in Yugoslavia as he did in other countries of the Fourth Moscow Conference on the partition of Europe; the USSR had not obtained preponderance there, as it was agreed in the Percentages agreement that he would retain only 50% influence over Yugoslavia. Tito therefore benefited from a margin of maneuver far greater than that of the other Southeast European leaders.

When the rest of Eastern Europe became satellite states of the Soviet Union, Yugoslavia refused to accept the 1948 Resolution of the Cominform which condemned the leaders of the League of Communists of Yugoslavia for allegedly abandoning Marxism-Leninism, and any communists who sympathised with Yugoslavia. The period from 1948 to 1955, known as the Informbiro, was marked by severe repression of opponents and many others accused of pro-Stalin attitudes being sent to the penal camp on Goli Otok in Yugoslavia. Likewise, real and accused Titoists or 'Titoites' were met with similar treatment in Eastern Bloc countries, which furthermore served to publicize the dangers of challenging subservience to Moscow, as well as to purge 'unwanted' individuals from their Communist parties.

== Ideology ==
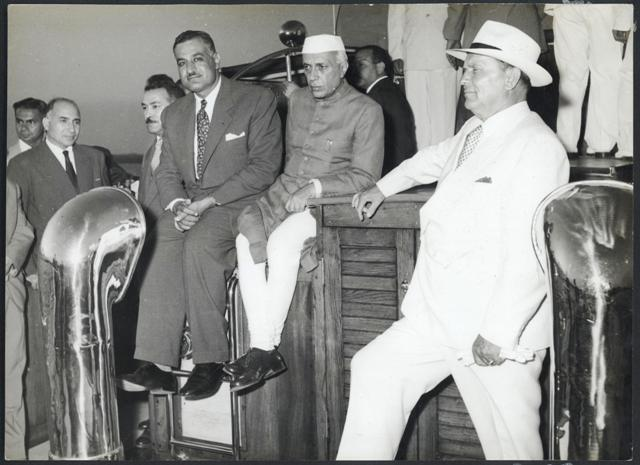
Tito, Nehru and Nasser in 1961, three of the five founders of the Non-Aligned Movement.

Elements of Titoism are characterized by policies and practices based on the principle that in each country the means of attaining ultimate communist goals must be dictated by the conditions of that particular country, rather than by a pattern set in another country. During Josip Broz Tito's era, this specifically meant that the communist goal should be pursued independently of and often in opposition to the policies of the Soviet Union.

In contrast to Joseph Stalin's policy of "socialism in one country", Tito advocated cooperation between developing nations in the world through the Non-Aligned Movement while at the same time pursuing socialism in whatever ways best suited particular nations. During Tito's era, his ideas specifically meant that the communist goal should be pursued independently of (and often in opposition to) what he referred to as the Stalinist and imperialist policies of the Soviet Union. Through this split and subsequent policies some commentators have grouped Titoism with Eurocommunism or reformist socialism. It was also meant to demonstrate the viability of a third way between the capitalist United States and the socialist Soviet Union.

In fact, on the economic level, Tito simply took note of the inability of the Stalinist-type centralized bureaucratic economy to meet human needs and expanded the number and power of cooperatives and workers' councils, several years before the Liberman reform and Mikhail Gorbachev in the USSR, before Imre Nagy and János Kádár in Hungary, Alexander Dubček in Czechoslovakia, and Deng Xiaoping in China.

Throughout his time in office, Tito prided himself on Yugoslavia's independence from the Soviet Union, with Yugoslavia never accepting full membership in Comecon and Tito's open rejection of many aspects of Stalinism as the most obvious manifestations of this. The Soviets and their satellite states often accused Yugoslavia of Trotskyism and social democracy, charges loosely based on Tito's socialist self-management, attempts at greater democratization in the workplace, and the theory of associated labor (profit sharing policies and worker-owned industries initiated by him, Milovan Đilas and Edvard Kardelj in 1950). It was in these things that the Soviet leadership accused of harboring the seeds of council communism or even corporatism. Despite Tito's numerous disagreements with the USSR, Yugoslavia restored relations with the USSR in 1956 with the Belgrade declaration and it became an associated member of the Comecon in 1964. Therefore, Yugoslavia once again strengthened its economic and political ties with the USSR.

Additionally, Yugoslavia joined the US-sponsored Balkan Pact in July 1953, a military alliance with two NATO member states — Greece and Turkey. The pact had been signed a few days before Stalin died, and the new Soviet government failed to develop any response. However, it was continually met with opposition by Albanian leader Enver Hoxha, who accused Tito and Yugoslavia for being agents of American imperialism. Tito signed this pact to bolster the defense of Yugoslavia against a potential Soviet military invasion. It also made the option of Yugoslavia's NATO membership more plausible at its time. Under this pact, any potential Soviet invasion of Yugoslavia could also lead to NATO intervention to help defend Yugoslavia due to the NATO memberships of Greece and Turkey. However, the foreign policy disagreements between the three countries in the pact eventually crippled the alliance itself, thus ending the possibility of Yugoslavia's NATO membership.

Some Trotskyists considered Tito to be an 'unconscious Trotskyist' because of the split with Stalin. However, other Trotskyists claimed that there were no fundamental differences in principles between Stalin and Tito, despite significant evidence suggesting the contrary. Most notably, Trotskyist writer Ted Grant published several articles criticizing both leaders in the British Trotskyist newspaper, of which he was the editor.

The "Titoist" regime adopted a policy of economic "self-management", generalized from 1950, wishing to put the means of production under social ownership of direct producers, thus excluding the formation of a bureaucracy as was the case in other communist regimes.

The propaganda attacks centered on the caricature of "Tito the Butcher" of the working class, aimed to pinpoint him as a covert agent of Western imperialism, pointing to Tito's partial cooperation with western and imperialist nations. Tito and Yugoslavia were seen by Western powers as a strategic ally with the possibility to "[drive] a wedge into the Communist monolith".

== History ==
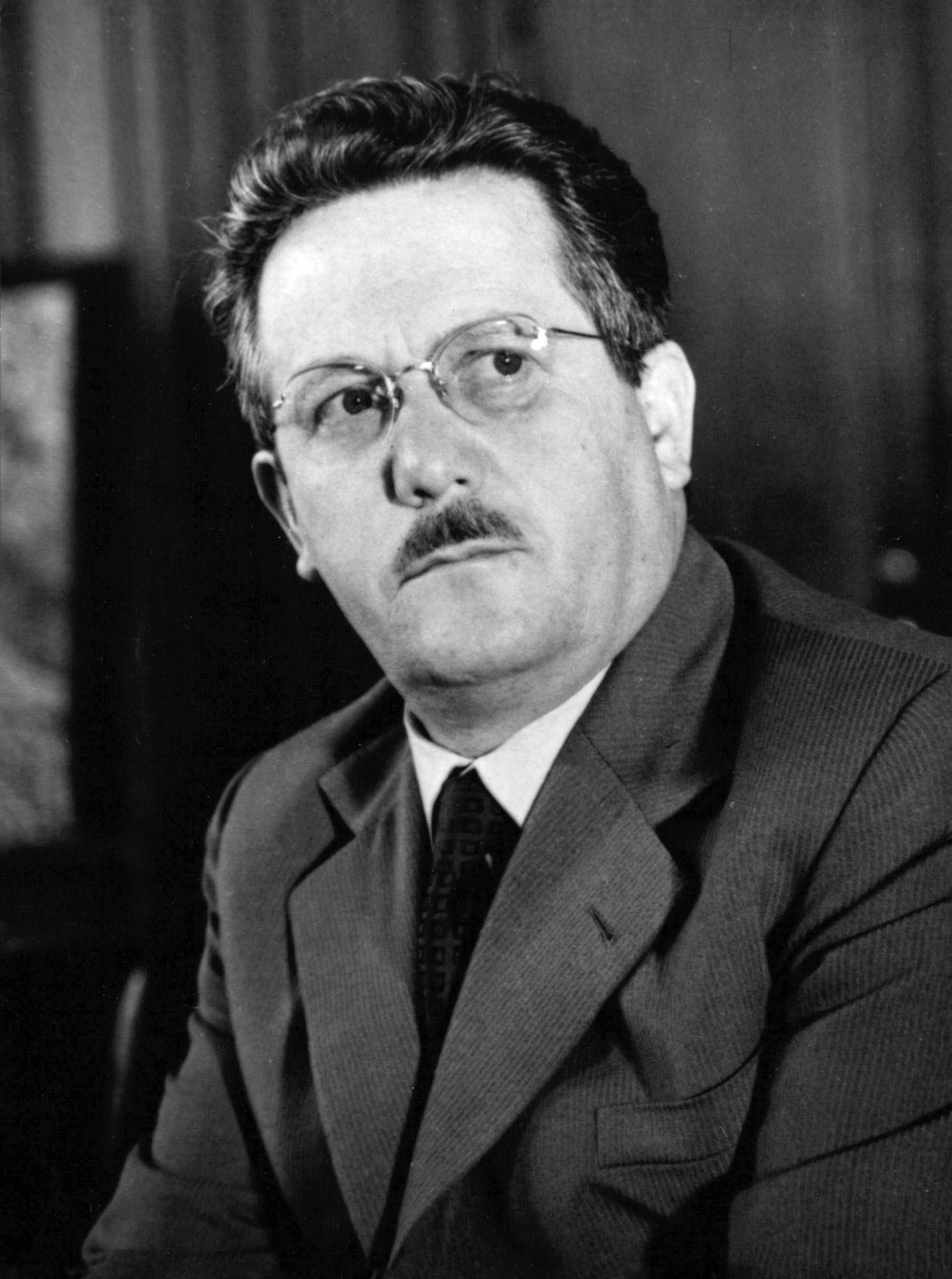
Edvard Kardelj

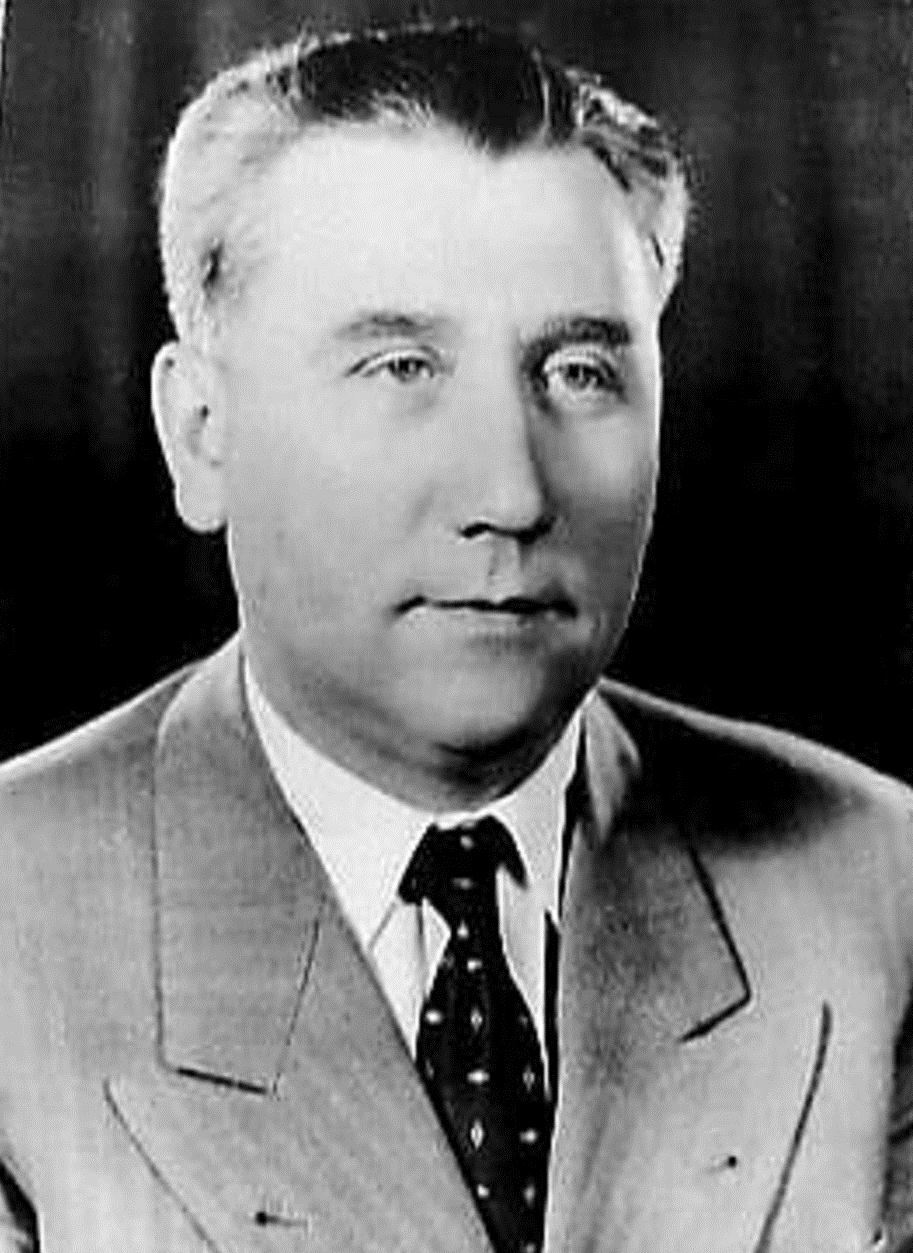
Aleksandar Ranković

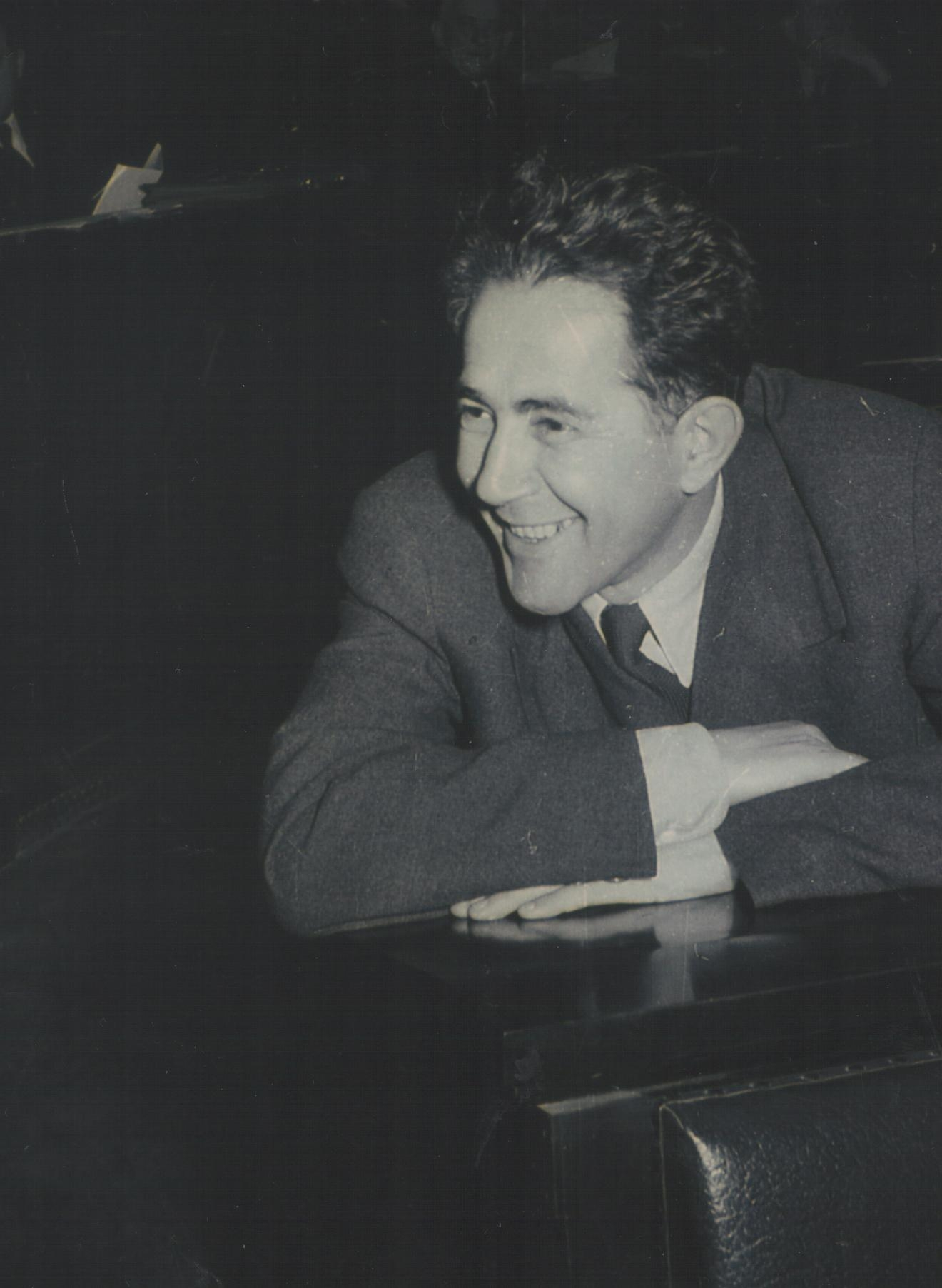
Milovan Đilas

From 1949 the central government began to cede power to communal local governments, seeking to decentralise the government and work towards a withering away of the state. In the system of local self-government, higher-level bodies could supervise compliance with the law by lower-level bodies, but could not issue orders to them. Edvard Kardelj declared in the Assembly of Yugoslavia "that no perfect bureaucratic apparatus, however brilliant the people at the top, can build socialism. Socialism can grow only from the initiatives of the masses of the people." Rankovićism disagreed with this decentralisation, viewing it as a threat to the stability of Yugoslavia. Other socialist states also criticised this move for deviating from Marxism-Leninism with declarations that it "is an outright denial of the teachings of Marxism-Leninism and the universal laws on the construction of socialism."

The League of Communists of Yugoslavia retained solid power; the legislature did little more than rubber stamp decisions already made by the LCY's Politburo. The secret police, the State Security Administration (UDBA), while operating with considerably more restraint than its counterparts in the rest of Eastern Europe, was nonetheless a feared tool of government control. UDBA was particularly notorious for assassinating suspected "enemies of the state" who lived in exile overseas. The media remained under restrictions that were onerous by Western standards, but still had more latitude than their counterparts in other Communist countries. Nationalist groups were a particular target of the authorities, with numerous arrests and prison sentences handed down over the years for separatist activities. Although the Soviets revised their attitudes under Nikita Khrushchev during the process of de-Stalinization and sought to normalize relations with the Yugoslavs while obtaining influence in the Non-Aligned Movement, the answer they got was never enthusiastic and the Soviet Union never gained a proper outlet to the Mediterranean Sea. At the same time, the Non-Aligned states failed to form a third Bloc, especially after the split at the outcome of the 1973 oil crisis.

Industry was nationalized, agriculture forcibly collectivized, and a rigid industrialization program based on the Soviet model was adopted. Yugoslav and Soviet companies signed contracts for numerous joint ventures. According to the American historian Adam Ulam, in no other country in the Eastern Bloc was Sovietization "as rapid and as ruthless as in Yugoslavia".

Despite the initial thaw between the USSR and the Yugoslavian authorities following the signing of the Belgrade declaration, relations became tense again between the two countries after Yugoslavia sheltered Imre Nagy following the invasion of Hungary. Tito initially approved the Soviet military intervention in his letter to Khrushchev due to fears of Hungarian Revolution provoking a similar anti-communist and nationalist movement in Yugoslavia. Still, Tito later sheltered Nagy to prove Yugoslavia's sovereign status and non-aligned foreign policy to gain sympathy from the international community. The abduction and the execution of Nagy by the Hungarian government under János Kádár cooled the bilateral relationship between Yugoslavia and Hungary, despite Tito's initial support and recommendations of Kadar as the successor of Mátyás Rákosi and Nagy.

Yugoslavia backed Czechoslovakia's leader Alexander Dubček during the 1968 Prague Spring and then cultivated a special (albeit incidental) relation with the maverick Romanian President Nicolae Ceaușescu. Titoism was similar to Dubček's socialism with a human face, while Ceaușescu attracted sympathies for his refusal to condone (and take part in) the Soviet invasion of Czechoslovakia, which briefly seemed to constitute a casus belli between Romania and the Soviets.

After a significant expansion of the private sector in the 1950s and 1960s and a shift towards a more market-oriented economy, the Yugoslavian leadership did put a halt to overt capitalist attempts (such as Stjepan Mesić's experiment with privatization in Orahovica) and crushed the dissidence of liberal or democratic socialist thinkers such as the former leader Milovan Đilas, while it also clamped down on centrifugal attempts, promoting Yugoslav patriotism. Although still claimed as official policies, nearly all aspects of Titoism went into rapid decline after Tito's death in 1980, being replaced by the rival policies of constituent republics. During the late 1980s, nationalism was again on the rise one decade after the Croatian Spring, and inter-republic ethnic tensions escalated.

== Reception ==
Victims of show trials for alleged Titoism

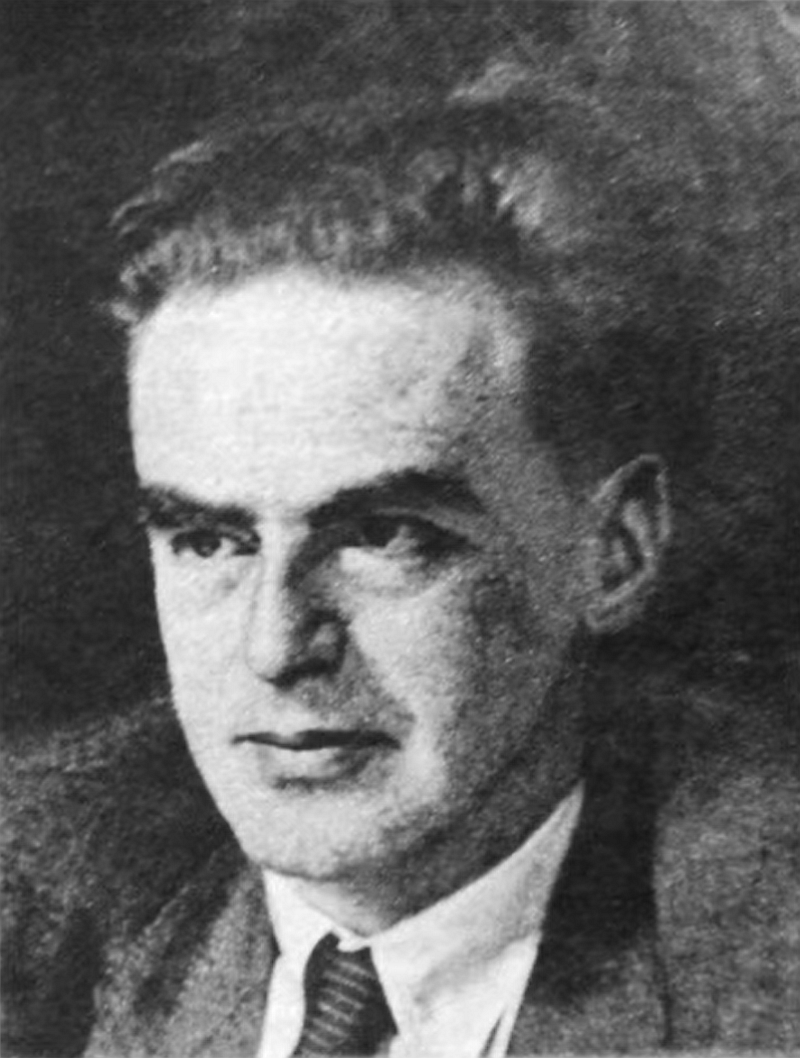
Rudolf Slánský of Czechoslovakia

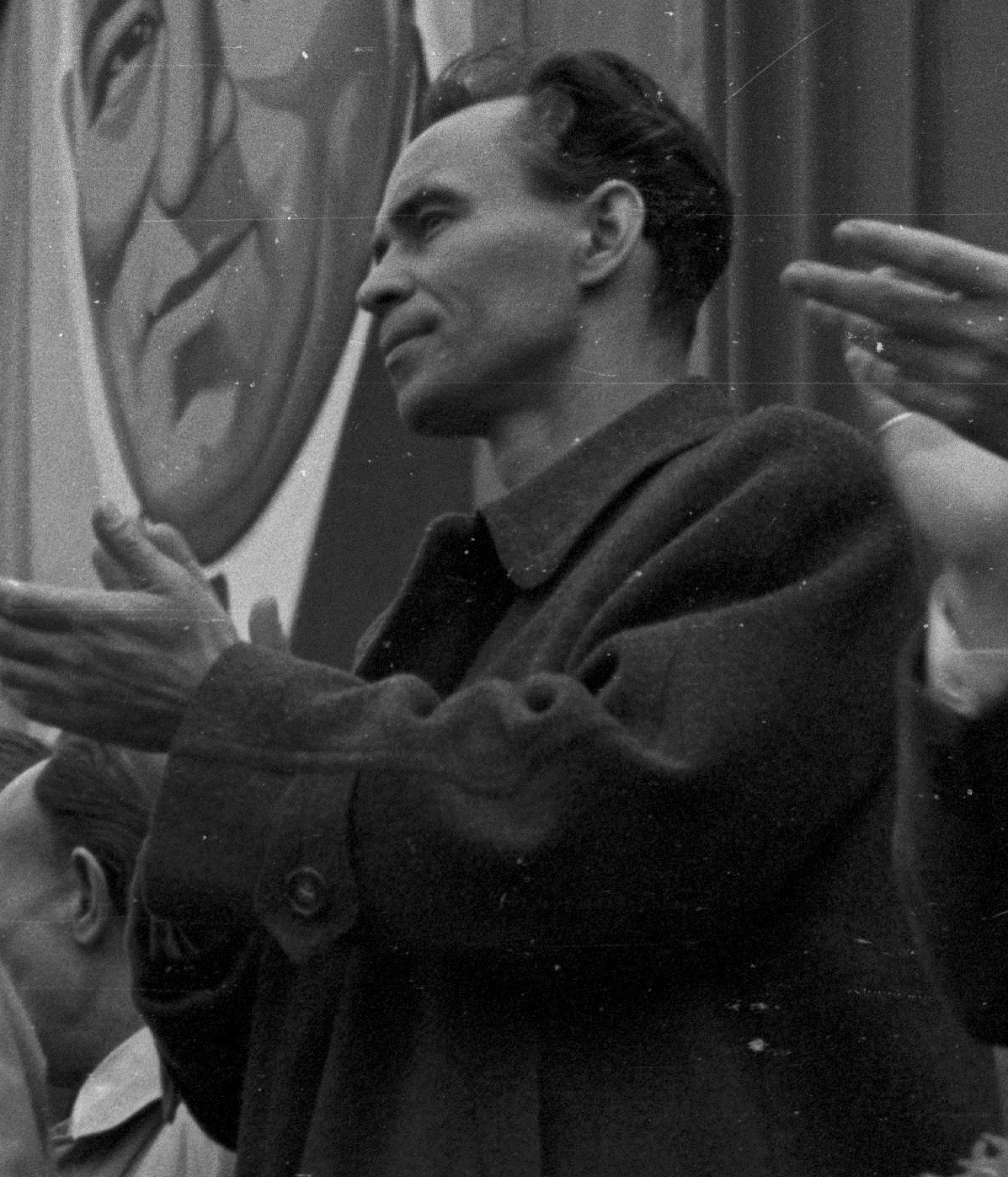
László Rajk of Hungary

Titoism has been perceived very differently by international figures. During Stalin's lifetime, the Soviet Union and Eastern Bloc countries reacted against Titoism with aggressive hostility. Participants in alleged Titoist conspiracies, such as the GDR historian Walter Markov, were subjected to reprisals, and some were put through staged show trials that ended with death sentences, such as the Rajk trial in Budapest in 1949 or the Slánský trial in Prague in 1952. About forty important trials against "Titoists" took place during the Informbiro period, in addition to persecution, arrest and deportation of thousands of less prominent individuals who were presumed to hold pro-Yugoslav sympathies. In France, the Cominform ordered the central committee of the French Communist Party to condemn "Titoism" in 1948 With prominent members such as Marcel Servin writing of the need to hunt down "Titoist spies" within the party. After Stalin's death, the Soviet conspiracy theories around Titoism subsided but continued. In the mid-1950s, Yugoslavia and the Soviet Union temporarily reconciled. Nevertheless, Titoism was generally condemned as revisionism in the Eastern bloc.

In Marxist circles in the West, Titoism was considered a form of Western socialism alongside Eurocommunism, which was appreciated by left-wing intellectuals who were breaking away from the Soviet line in the 1960s. In the 1960s, political scientists understood Titoist state narrative as a form of socialist patriotism. Historian Adam Ulam was more critical of Titoism and writes that Titoism has always "retained its (albeit mild) totalitarian one-party character".

Muammar Gaddafi's Third International Theory, outlined in his Green Book which informed Libyan national policy from its formation in 1975 until Gaddafi's downfall in 2011, was heavily inspired by and shared many similarities with Titoism and Yugoslav workers' self-management.

Titoism gained influence in the communist parties in the 1940s, including Poland (Władysław Gomułka), Hungary (László Rajk, Imre Nagy), Bulgaria (Traicho Kostov), Czechoslovakia (Vladimír Clementis), and Romania (Lucrețiu Pătrășcanu). All of whom, except for Nagy, were accused, charged and convicted in show trials for "Titoism", and except for Gomułka, were executed.

=== National communism or proletarian internationalism ===
Titoism has sometimes been referred to as a form of "national communism", an attempt to reconcile nationalism with communism, traditionally considered incompatible by Marxist social philosophers. Walker Connor posits that Titoism is more akin to "state communism", and that Tito advocated patriotism rather than nationalism, as the loyalty is to a state comprising multiple nations. Nationalism was, therefore a threat to Titoism. Tito and the Yugoslav leadership firmly rejected existence of 'national communism', describing the accusations as "attempts to stigmatise recognition of the diversity of forms in socialist processes" and asserted that Yugoslav communists too are proletarian internationalists, stating that:

... internationalism does not start where autonomy and independence end. Real revolutionary unity and socialist solidarity must be based on such a community of interests and views as arises from the full independence and responsibility of each party. Today, more than ever before, the international workers' movement needs such unity as does not conceal differences; but, on the contrary, recognized them. After all, total unity in the international workers' movement has never existed.

— Josip Broz Tito, (1965)

Yugoslav interpretation of proletarian internationalism was outlined in "The Programme of the League of Yugoslav Communists": "Proletarian internationalism demands correct relationships, and support of and solidarity with every socialist country and every socialist movement genuinely fighting for socialism, peace, and active peaceful coexistence between peoples." This posture was contrasted to Stalin's conception of proletarian internationalism "which required unity within the Communist Camp under the leadership of one party which was committed to the interest of one country, the Soviet Union."

== See also ==
- Balkan Pact
- Arab socialism
- Ba'athism
- Economy of the former Yugoslavia
- Goulash Communism
- New Economic Policy
- Market socialism
- Praxis School
- Non-Aligned Movement
- Soviet Union–Yugoslavia relations
- United States–Yugoslavia relations
- Total National Defense (Yugoslavia)
- Worker cooperative
- Yugoslavism
- Yugo-nostalgia
- Yugoslavs

=== Similar ideologies ===
- Chavismo
- Fidelismo
- Hoxhaism
- Kemalism
- Lulism
- Marhaenism
- Nasserism
