= President (government title) =

Title of the head of state in various governments

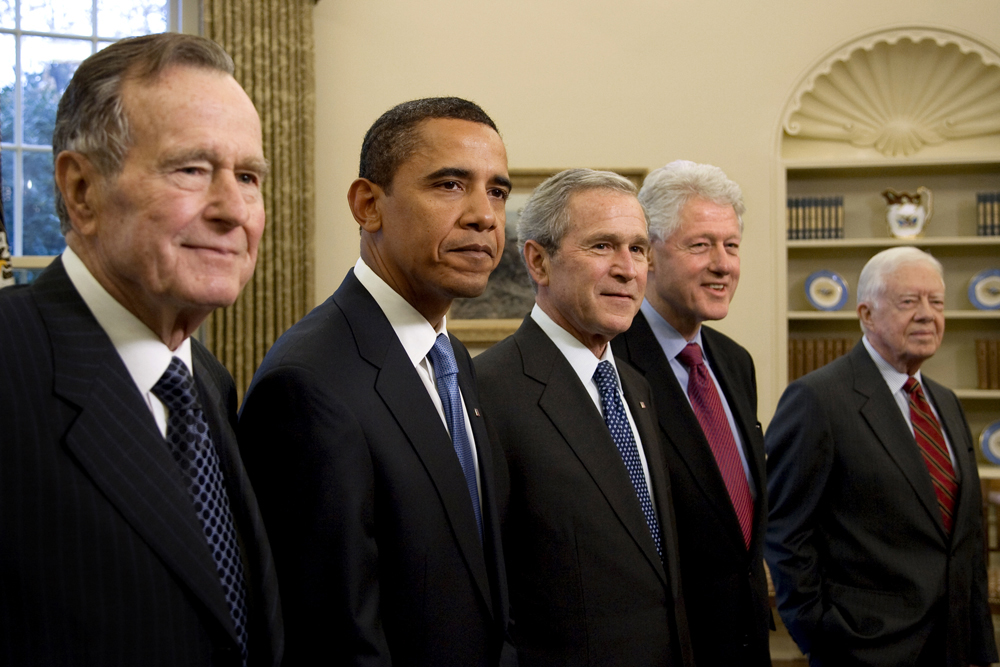
Five American presidents in the White House in 2009 (Left to right: George H. W. Bush, Barack Obama, George W. Bush, Bill Clinton, and Jimmy Carter)

President is a common title for the head of state in most republics. The role of a president can vary depending on the country, with some serving as the head of government, a ceremonial figurehead, or some other distinction.

The functions exercised by a president vary according to the form of government. In parliamentary republics, they are usually, but not always, limited to those of the head of state and are a largely ceremonial role. An exception to this would be presidential-parliamentary republics (e.g. Botswana and South Africa), where the role of the president is more prominent and encompasses more of the functions of a head of government. The president of a semi-presidential republic has some discretionary powers, such as involvement in foreign affairs or the appointment of the head of government agencies, but they are not themselves the head of government. A leader of a one-party state may also hold the position of president for ceremonial purposes or to maintain an official state position.

Styles such as "Mr. President" or "Madam President" may apply to a person holding the title of president or presiding over certain other governmental bodies. "Mr. President" has subsequently been used by governments to refer to their heads of state. It is the conventional translation of non-English styles such as Monsieur le Président for the president of the French Republic. It also has a long history of usage as the title of the presiding officers of legislative and judicial bodies. The speaker of the House of Commons of Canada is addressed as président(e) de la Chambre des communes in French and as Mr. Speaker or Madam Speaker in English.

== History ==
The title president is derived from the Latin prae- "before" + sedere "to sit". The word "president" is also used throughout the original Latinate Douay–Rheims Bible, most notably to translate the title for Pontius Pilate in Matthew 27, and the plural "presidents" is used in the King James Bible at Daniel 6:2 to translate the Aramaic term סָרְכִ֣ין (sā·rə·ḵîn), a word of likely Persian origin, meaning "officials", "commissioners", "overseers" or "chiefs". As such, it originally designated the officer who presides over or "sits before" a gathering and ensures that debate is conducted according to the rules of order (see also chairman and speaker), but today it most commonly refers to an executive official in any social organization. Early examples are from the universities of Oxford and Cambridge (from 1464) and the founding president of the Royal Society, William Brouncker, in 1660. This usage survives today in the title of such offices as "President of the Board of Trade" and "Lord President of the Council" in the United Kingdom, as well as "President of the Senate" in the United States (one of the roles constitutionally assigned to the vice president). The officiating priest at certain Anglican religious services, too, is sometimes called the "president" in this sense.

The most common modern usage is as the title of a head of state in a republic. The first usage of the word president to denote the highest official in a government was during the Commonwealth of England.

=== Commonwealth ===
Thomas Hungerford, first recorded speaker of the English House of Commons in the rolls of the Parliament of England in 1376/7,, used the title, "Mr. Speaker", a precedent followed by subsequent speakers of the House of Commons.

After the abolition of the monarchy, the English Council of State, whose members were elected by the House of Commons, became the executive government of the Commonwealth. The Council of State was the successor of the Privy Council, which had previously been headed by the lord president; its successor the Council of State was also headed by a lord president, the first of which was John Bradshaw. However, the lord president alone was not head of state, because that office was vested in the council as a whole.

The speaker of the House of Commons of Canada, established in 1867, is also addressed as "Monsieur le Président" or "Madame la Présidente" in French.

=== France ===
In pre-revolutionary France, the president of a Parlement evolved into a powerful magistrate, a member of the so-called noblesse de robe ("nobility of the gown"), with considerable judicial as well as administrative authority. The name referred to his primary role of presiding over trials and other hearings. In the 17th and 18th centuries, seats in the Parlements, including presidencies, became effectively hereditary, since the holder of the office could ensure that it would pass to an heir by paying the crown a special tax known as the paulette. The post of "first president" (premier président), however, could be held by only the King's nominees. The Parlements were abolished by the French Revolution. In modern France the chief judge of a court is known as its president (président de la cour).

By the 18th century, the president of a French parlement was addressed as "Monsieur le Président". In Pierre Choderlos de Laclos's 1782 novel Les Liaisons dangereuses ("Dangerous Liaisons"), the wife of a magistrate in a parlement is referred to as Madame la Présidente de Tourvel ("Madam President of Tourvel"). The fictional name Tourvel refers not to the parlement in which the magistrate sits, but rather, in imitation of an aristocratic title, to his private estate. This influenced parliamentary usage in France. When the Second French Republic was established in 1848, "Monsieur le Président" became the title of the president of the French Republic.

=== United States ===
The modern usage of the term president to designate a single person who is the head of state of a republic can be traced directly to the United States Constitution of 1787, which created the office of president of the United States. Previous American governments had included "presidents" (such as the president of the Continental Congress or the president of the Massachusetts Provincial Congress), but these were presiding officers in the older sense, with no executive authority. It has been suggested that the executive use of the term was borrowed from early American colleges and universities, which were usually headed by a president. British universities were headed by an official called the "Chancellor" (typically a ceremonial position) while the chief administrator held the title of "Vice-Chancellor". But America's first institutions of higher learning (such as Harvard University and Yale University) did not resemble a full-sized university so much as one of its constituent colleges. A number of colleges at Cambridge University featured an official called the "president". The head, for instance, of Magdalene College, Cambridge was called the master and his second the president. The first president of Harvard, Henry Dunster, had been educated at Magdalene. Some have speculated that he borrowed the term out of a sense of humility, considering himself only a temporary placeholder. The presiding official of Yale College, originally a "rector" (after the usage of continental European universities), became "president" in 1745.

A common style of address for presidents, "Mr/Mrs. President", is borrowed from British Parliamentary tradition, in which the presiding Speaker of the House of Commons is referred to as "Mr/Mrs. Speaker". Coincidentally, this usage resembles the older French custom of referring to the president of a parlement as "Monsieur/Madame le Président", a form of address that in modern France applies to both the president of the Republic and to chief judges. In the United States, the title "Mr. President" is used in a number of formal instances as well: for example anyone presiding over the United States Senate is addressed as "Mr./Madam President", especially the vice president, who is the president of the Senate. Other uses of the title include presidents of state and local legislatures; however, only the president of the United States uses the title outside of formal sessions.

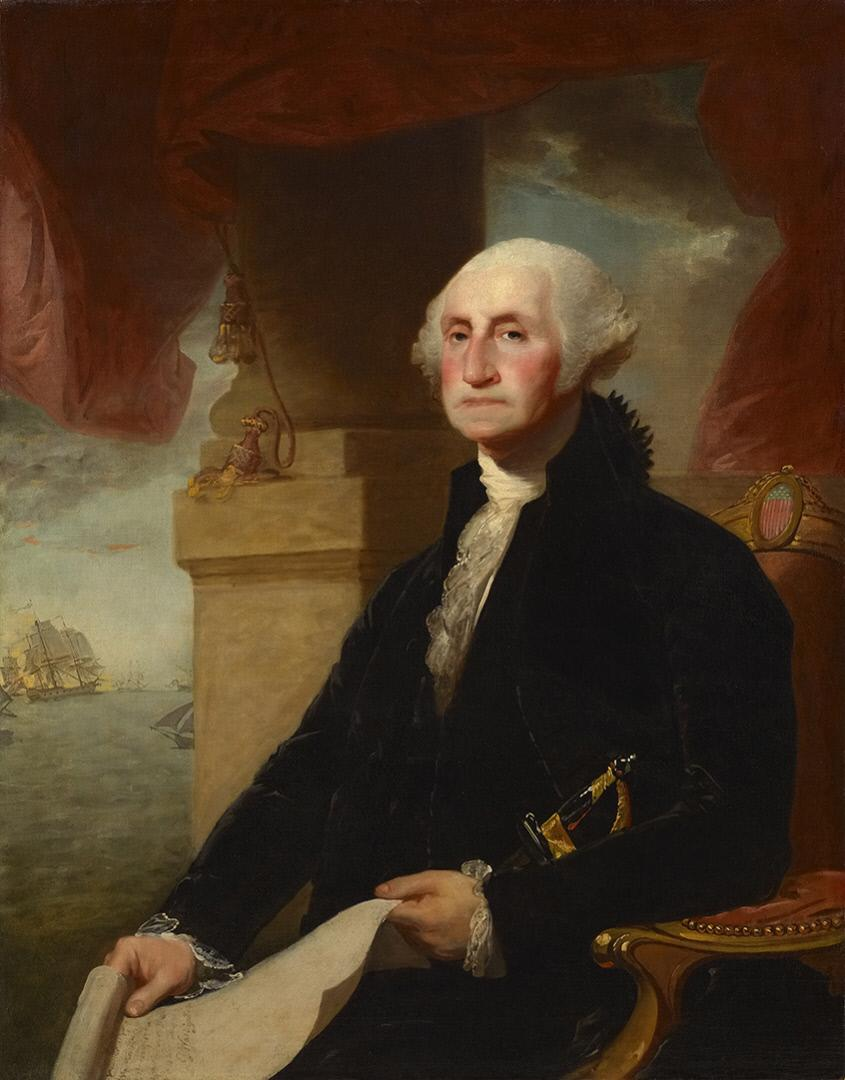
George Washington, the first president of the United States

The 1787 Constitution of the United States did not specify the manner of address for the president. When George Washington was sworn in as the first president of the United States on April 30, 1789, however, the administering of the oath of office ended with the proclamation: "Long live George Washington, President of the United States." No title other than the name of the office of the executive was officially used at the inauguration. The question of a presidential title was being debated in Congress at the time, however, having become official legislative business with Richard Henry Lee's motion of April 23, 1789. Lee's motion asked Congress to consider "what titles it will be proper to annex to the offices of President and Vice President of the United States – if any other than those given in the Constitution". Vice President John Adams, in his role as President of the United States Senate, organized a congressional committee. There Adams agitated for the adoption of the style of Highness (as well as the title of Protector of Their [the United States'] Liberties) for the president. Adams and Lee were among the most outspoken proponents of an exalted presidential title.

Others favoured the variant of Electoral Highness or the lesser Excellency, the latter of which was vociferously opposed by Adams, who contended that it was far beneath the presidential dignity, as the executives of the states, some of which were also titled "President" (e.g. the president of Pennsylvania), at that time often enjoyed the style of Excellency; Adams said the president "would be leveled with colonial governors or with functionaries from German princedoms" if he were to use the style of Excellency. Adams and Richard Henry Lee both feared that cabals of powerful senators would unduly influence a weak executive, and saw an exalted title as a way of strengthening the presidency. On further consideration, Adams deemed even Highness insufficient and instead proposed that the executive, both the president and the vice president (i.e., himself), be styled Majesty to prevent the "great danger" of an executive with insufficient dignity. Adams' efforts were met with widespread derision; Thomas Jefferson called them "the most superlatively ridiculous thing I ever heard of", while Benjamin Franklin considered it "absolutely mad".

Washington consented to the demands of James Madison and the United States House of Representatives that the title be altered to "Mr. President". Nonetheless, later "The Honorable" became the standard title of the president in formal address, and "His/Her Excellency" became the title of the president when addressed formally internationally.

Historically, the title was reserved for the incumbent president only, and was not to be used for former presidents, holding that it was not proper to use the title as a courtesy title when addressing a former president. According to the official website of the United States of America, the correct way to address a letter is to use "The Honorable John Doe" and the correct salutation is "Mr. Doe".

Once the United States adopted the title of "president" for its head of state, many other nations followed suit.

=== Other countries ===
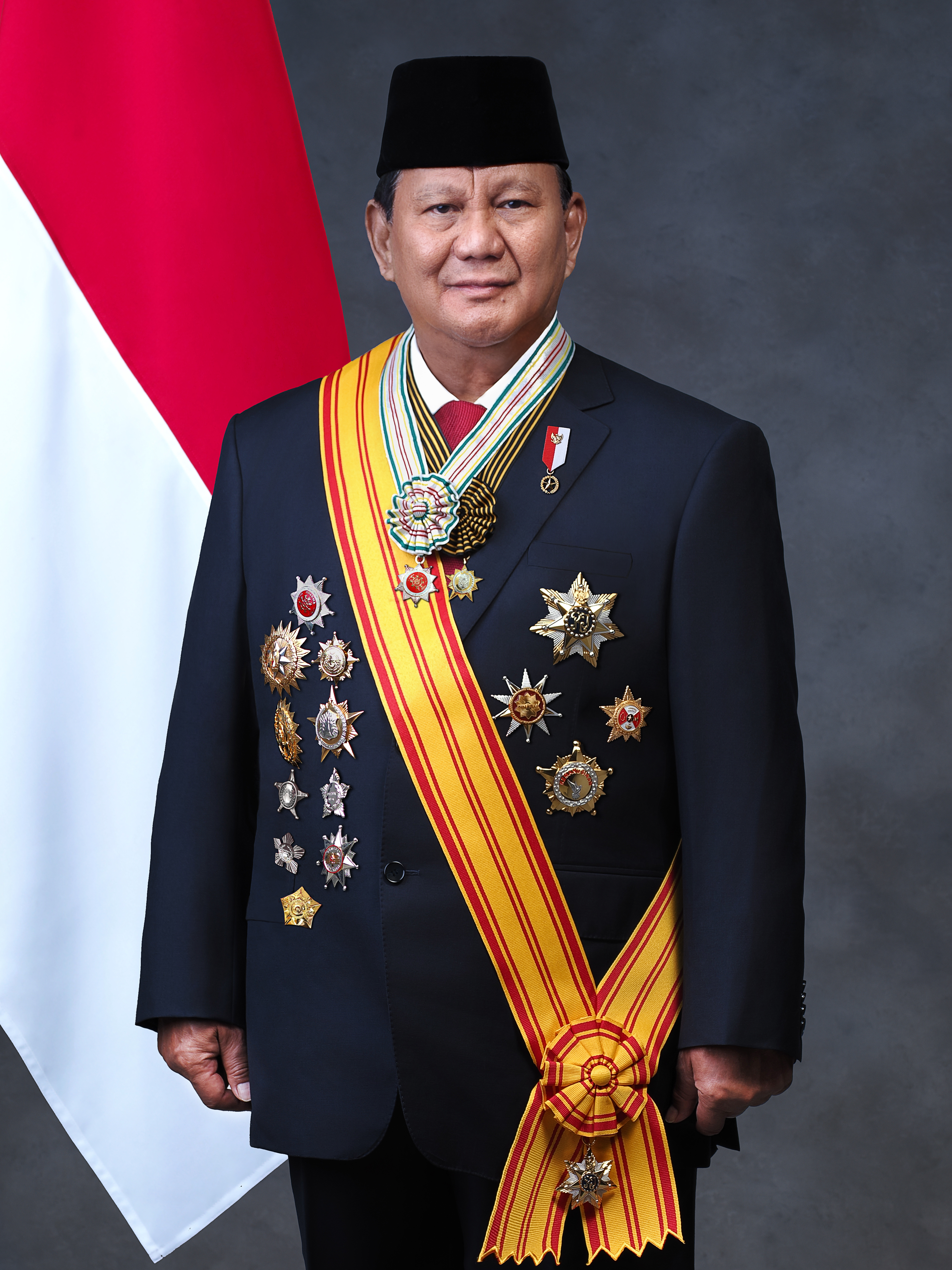
Prabowo Subianto, the eighth president of Indonesia, is the democratically elected president with the largest popular vote in the world.

Haiti became the first presidential republic in the Caribbean when Henri Christophe assumed the title in 1807. Almost all the Pan-American nations that became independent from Spain in the early 1810s and 1820s chose a US-style president as their chief executive. The first European president was the president of the Italian Republic of 1802, a client state of revolutionary France, in the person of Napoleon Bonaparte. The first African president was the president of Liberia (1848), while the first Asian president was the president of the Philippines (1899).

== Description ==
In the twentieth and twenty-first centuries, the powers of presidencies have varied from country to country. The spectrum of power has included presidents-for-life and hereditary presidencies to ceremonial heads of state.

Presidents in the countries with a democratic or representative form of government are usually elected for a specified period of time and in some cases may be re-elected by the same process by which they are appointed, i.e. in many nations, periodic popular elections. The powers vested in such presidents vary considerably. Some presidencies, such as that of Ireland, are largely ceremonial, whereas other systems vest the president with substantive powers such as the appointment and dismissal of prime ministers or cabinets, the power to declare war, and powers of veto on legislation. In many nations the president is also the commander-in-chief of the nation's armed forces, though this varies significantly around the world.

The roles of the president, regardless of the government system, are fundamentally defined by the tension between two distinct constitutional and political functions: the Head of State and the Head of Government. The way a nation’s constitution delegates or separates these two roles determines the institutional power, stability, and political dynamics of the executive branch.

=== Presidential systems ===
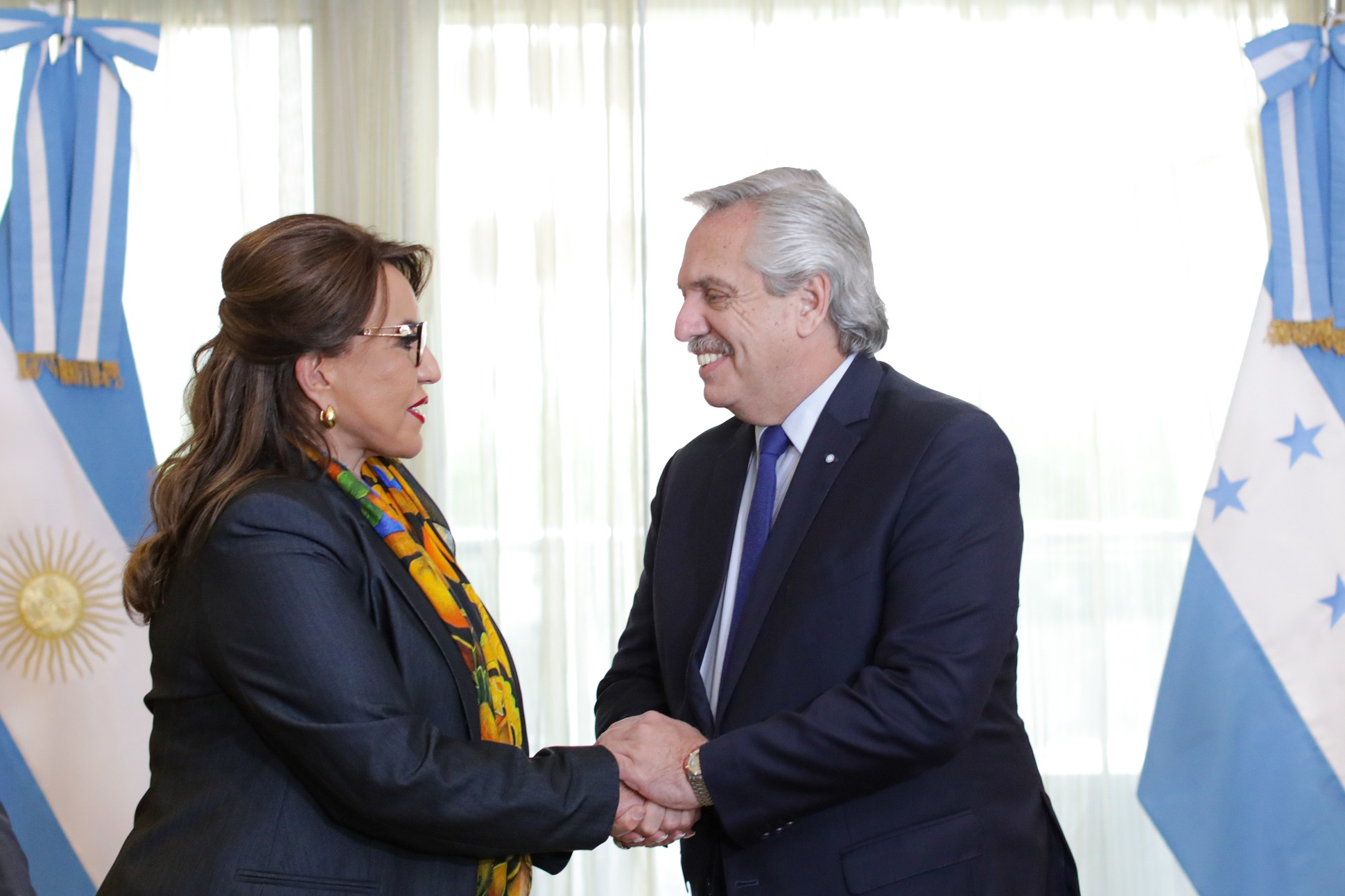
Presidents Xiomara Castro (left) of Honduras and Alberto Fernández (right) of Argentina

In almost all states with a presidential system of government, the president exercises the functions of head of state and head of government, i.e. the president directs the executive branch of government. When a president is not only head of state, but also head of government, this is known in Europe as a President of the Council (from the French Président du Conseil), used 1871–1940 and 1944–1958 in the Third and Fourth French Republics. In the United States the president has always been both Head of State and Head of Government and has always had the title of President.

In pure presidential systems, such as the United States, the president simultaneously holds both the ceremonial role of the head of state and the political role of the head of government. This unified presidency provides strong, decisive leadership but is prone to inherent tension and structural conflict.

Presidents in this system are either directly elected by popular vote or indirectly elected by an electoral college or some other democratically elected body.

In the United States, the president is indirectly elected by the Electoral College made up of electors chosen by voters in the presidential election. In most states of the United States, each elector is committed to voting for a specified candidate determined by the popular vote in each state, so that the people, in voting for each elector, are in effect voting for the candidate. However, for various reasons the numbers of electors in favour of each candidate are unlikely to be proportional to the popular vote. Thus, in five close United States elections (1824, 1876, 1888, 2000, and 2016), the candidate with the most popular votes still lost the election.

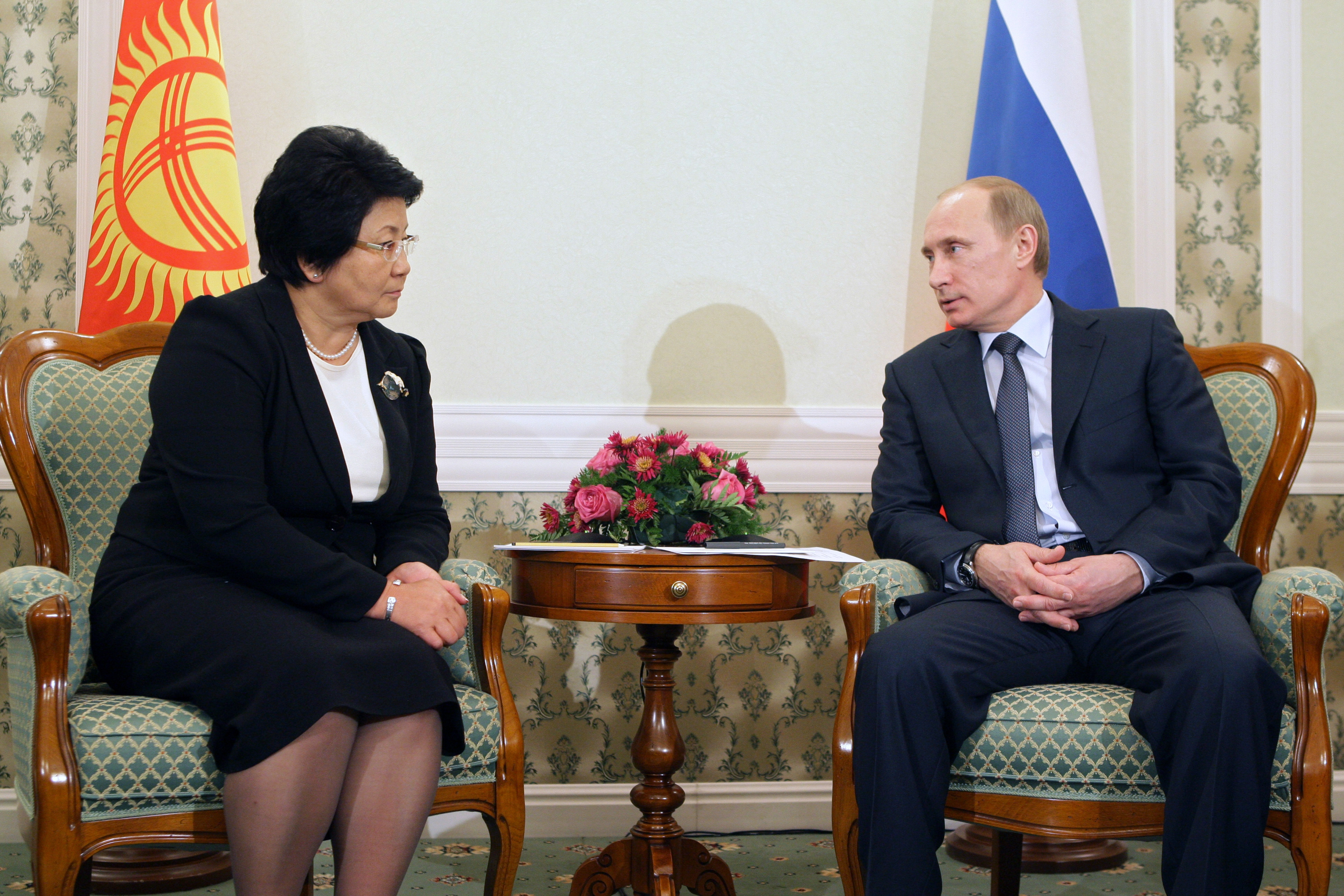
Presidents Otunbayeva (left) and Putin (right) of Kyrgyzstan and Russia

In Mexico, the president is directly elected for a six-year term by popular vote. The candidate who wins the most votes is elected president even without an absolute majority. The president is allowed to serve only one term.

In Brazil, the president is directly elected for a four-year term by popular vote. A candidate has to have more than 50% of the valid votes. If no candidates achieve a majority of the votes, there is a runoff election between the two candidates with most votes. Again, a candidate needs a majority of the vote to be elected. In Brazil, a president cannot be elected to more than two consecutive terms, but there is no limit on the number of terms a president can serve.

Many South American, Central American, African and some Asian nations follow the presidential model.

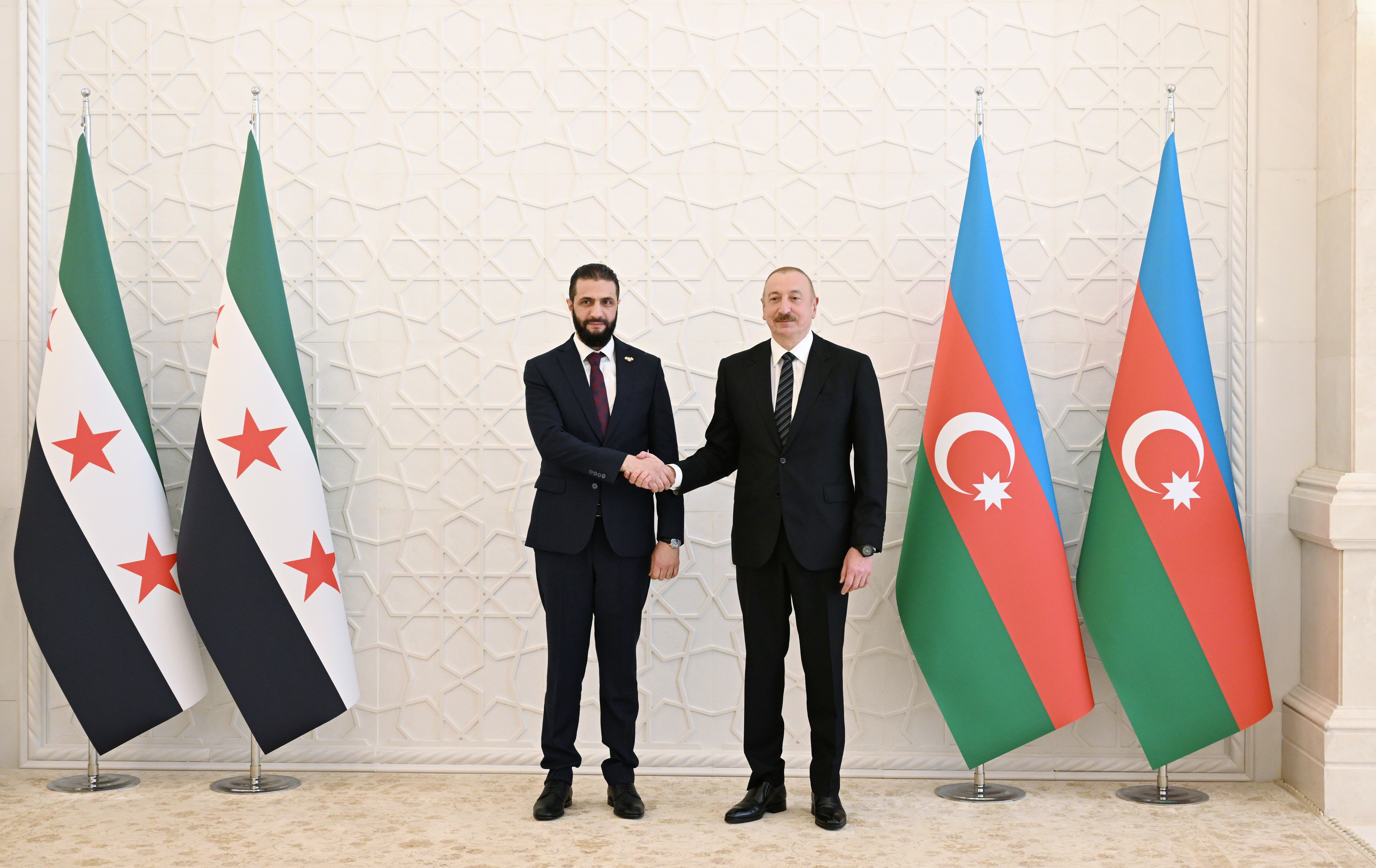
Presidents al-Sharaa (left) of Syria and Alyev (right) of Azerbaijan.

The core challenge of the unified presidency is that the president must act as a partisan political leader to achieve their policy goals (head of government), yet simultaneously serve as a unifying, supra-partisan national symbol (head of state).

When a U.S. president champions controversial legislation or vetoes bills, they fulfill their duty as the head of government. However, these partisan actions inevitably alienate the opposition, making it extremely difficult to retain the moral and symbolic authority needed for the head of state role. This role conflict often fuels political polarization, forcing the president to choose between being an effective political leader and a respected national symbol.

The use of executive orders illustrates this tension perfectly. These are unilateral powers used by the head of government to manage the administrative state. When a president uses them to enact sweeping policy changes that bypass the legislature, opponents frequently accuse them of abusing their political power, thereby undermining the president's perceived legitimacy as the impartial head of state who upholds constitutional norms.

Linz's Dual Legitimacy: This institutional design also connects to Juan Linz's theory of Dual Legitimacy. The conflict between the president (head of government with a popular mandate) and the Congress (head of state with a popular mandate) in a divided government (like South Korea's ‘Divided Government' situation) is a direct manifestation of this structural tension, where the fixed term rigidity prevents easy resolution of the conflict between the two branches claiming equal democratic legitimacy. For example, In South Korea, president Yoon has vetoed 18 times in 2024 year alone and 25 times since taking office. This is the second record in history after former president Seungman Lee.

=== Semi-presidential systems ===
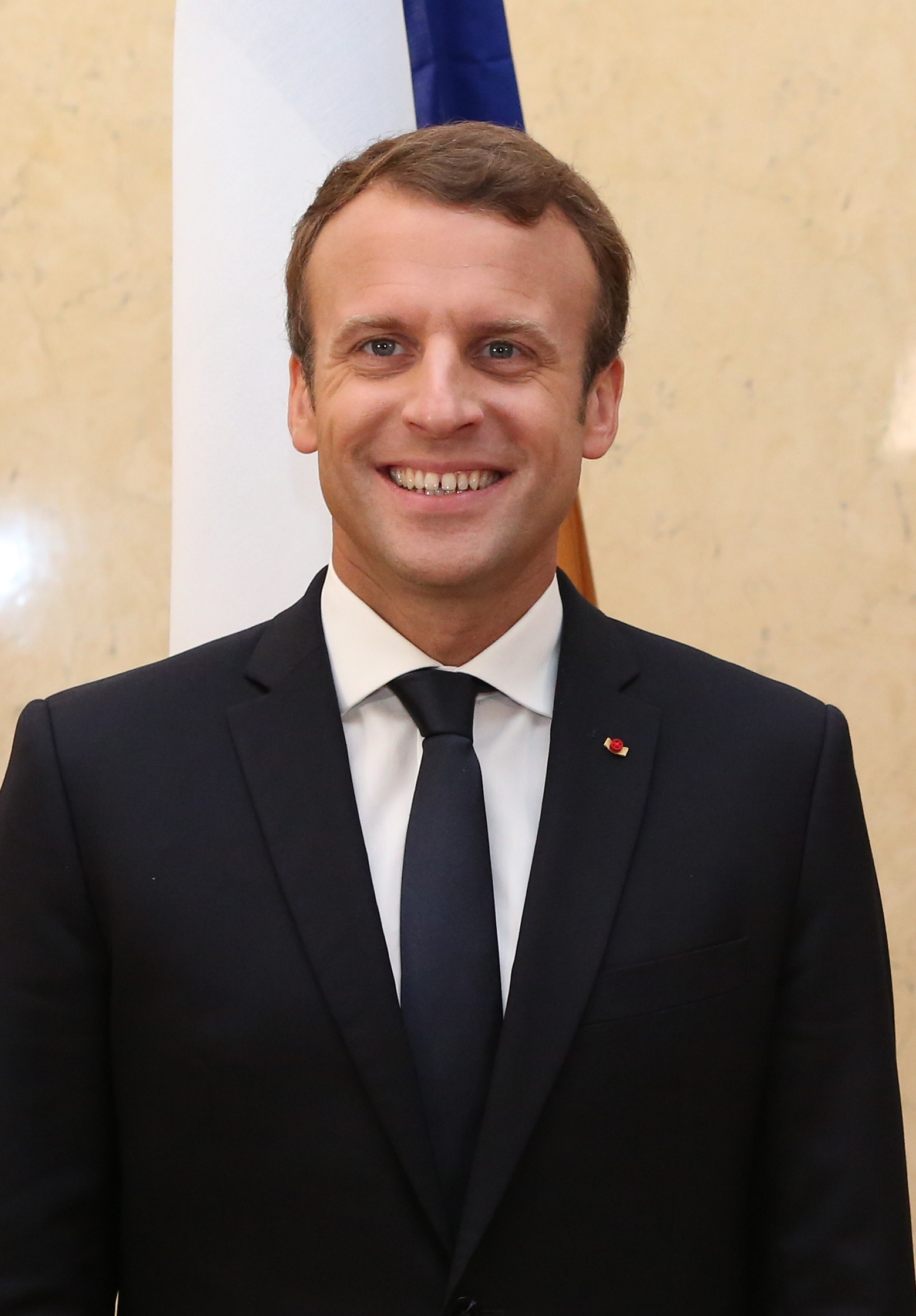
Emmanuel Macron, President of France

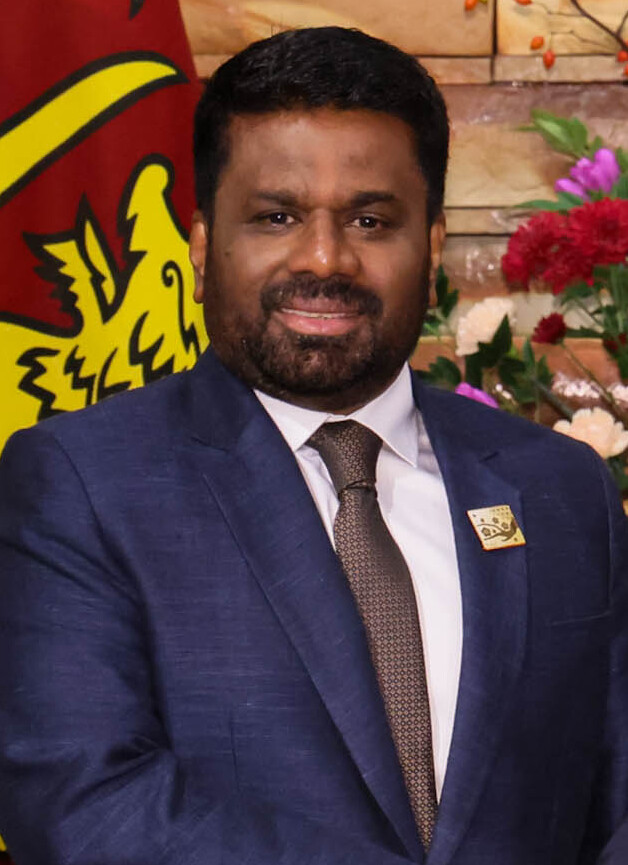
Anura Kumara Dissanayake, President of Sri Lanka

A second system is the semi-presidential system, also known as the French model. In this system, as in the parliamentary system, there are both a president and a prime minister; but unlike the parliamentary system, the president may have significant day-to-day power. For example, in France, when their party controls the majority of seats in the National Assembly, the president can operate closely with the parliament and prime minister, and work towards a common agenda. When the National Assembly is controlled by their opponents, however, the president can find themselves marginalized with the opposition party prime minister exercising most of the power. Though the prime minister remains an appointee of the president, the president must obey the rules of parliament, and select a leader from the house's majority holding party. Thus, sometimes the president and prime minister can be allies, sometimes rivals; the latter situation is known in France as cohabitation. Variants of the French semi-presidential system, developed at the beginning of the Fifth Republic by Charles de Gaulle, are used in France, Portugal, Romania, Sri Lanka and several post-colonial countries which have emulated the French model. In Finland, although the 2000 constitution moved towards a ceremonial presidency, the system is still formally semi-presidential, with the president of Finland retaining e.g. foreign policy and appointment powers. Sri Lanka, formerly the Dominion of Ceylon, declared itself a republic in 1972. It introduced a Westminster style Parliamentary system, with William Gopallawa as the nominal head of state, styled as the president. In 1978, J. R. Jayawardene Introduced the 2nd Republican Constitution with a Semi-Presidential System.

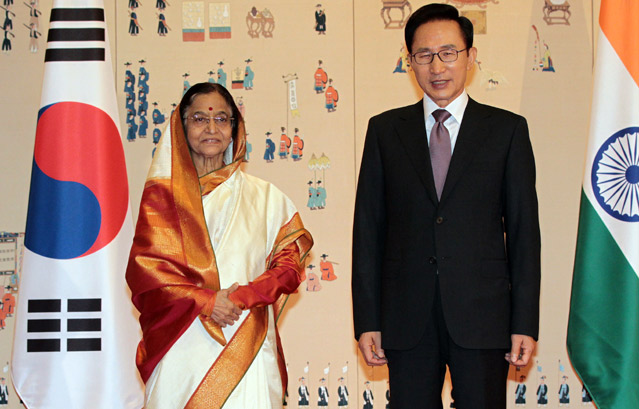
Presidents Pratibha Patil (left) of India and Lee Myung-bak (right) of South Korea

The semi-presidential system (Dual-Executive or Premier-Presidential system), most famously established in the French Fifth Republic, offers a model where the dual roles are not fully separated, but rather institutionally shared between two positions: the president and the prime minister. This system explicitly formalizes the dual-executive structure.

The president, popularly elected, serves as the primary head of state but retains significant head of government powers, particularly over foreign policy and national defense (the domaine réservé). The prime minister, who must command the confidence of the National Assembly, focuses on domestic policy and administration, serving as the functional head of government. The political function of the dual roles becomes most evident during "cohabitation." This occurs when the president and the parliamentary majority belong to different political parties. In this scenario:

The president (head of state) is forced to appoint a prime minister from the opposition party. The head of government power effectively shifts to the prime minister, who controls the domestic policy agenda. The president is largely relegated to the core head of state and foreign policy roles, creating a temporary, functional separation of powers within the executive branch.

The first time a French president and prime minister were from different political parties was called cohabitation, happening from 1986 to 1988. The Socialist President, François Mitterrand, had to pick a conservative, Jacques Chirac, as his prime minister because conservatives won the most seats in parliament. Chirac took full control of domestic policy, like selling off state-owned companies (privatization). This showed he was in charge of the head of government role. Mitterrand mainly focused on being the head of state, keeping control over foreign policy and the military. This situation proved that even with a strong president, the system could shift power based on election results, making the president share his executive duties.

=== Parliamentary republics ===
The parliamentary republic, is a parliamentary system in which the presidency is largely ceremonial with either de facto or no significant executive authority (such as the president of Austria) or de jure no significant executive power (such as the president of Ireland), and the executive powers rests with the prime minister who automatically assumes the post as head of a majority party or coalition, but takes oath of office administered by the president. However, the president is head of the civil service, commander in chief of the armed forces and in some cases can dissolve parliament. Countries using this system include Austria, Armenia, Albania, Bangladesh, Czech Republic, Germany, Greece, Hungary, Iceland, India, Ireland, Israel, Italy, Malta, Pakistan, and Singapore.

A variation of the parliamentary republic is a system with an executive president in which the president is the head of state and the government but unlike a presidential system, is elected by and accountable to a parliament, and referred to as president. Countries using this system include Botswana, Nauru and South Africa.

In many parliamentary republics, the dual roles are completely and constitutionally separated, leaving the president with only the head of state functions.

In countries like Germany or India, the president is purposefully stripped of meaningful head of government authority. Their function is strictly ceremonial and symbolic. They serve as the head of state, the final signature on legislation, and the formal nominator of the prime minister chosen by the parliamentary majority.

This radical separation ensures that the president can fulfill the unifying, supra-partisan role of the head of state without interference from the day-to-day political conflicts of the government. By eliminating the political component of the executive role, the office avoids the internal conflicts faced by the unified presidency.

In these systems, the prime minister (or Chancellor) is the undisputed and sole head of government. Their power is entirely political, derived from and accountable to the legislature through a continuous mechanism of confidence (or no-confidence). The German president is a purely ceremonial head of state, lacking the head of government authority held by the Chancellor. This was clear in 2017 when coalition talks collapsed. President Frank-Walter Steinmeier did not impose policy or force a solution. Instead, he used his impartial authority and constitutional duty to facilitate dialogue among party leaders. His role was strictly limited to safeguarding the constitutional order and enabling the political process to form the new government, demonstrating the power of a non-partisan symbol.

=== Dictatorships ===
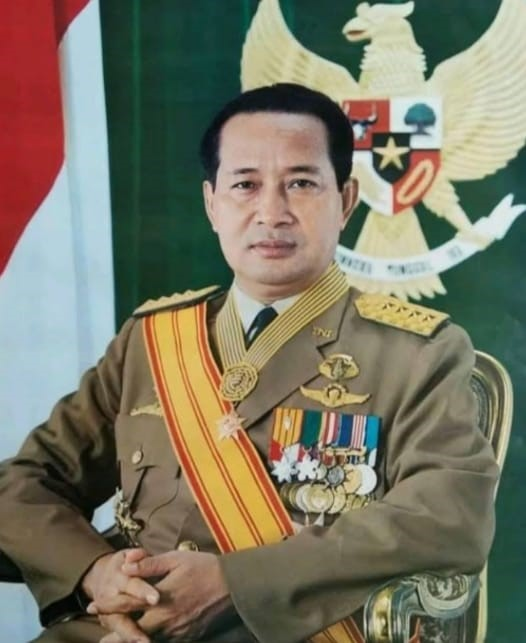
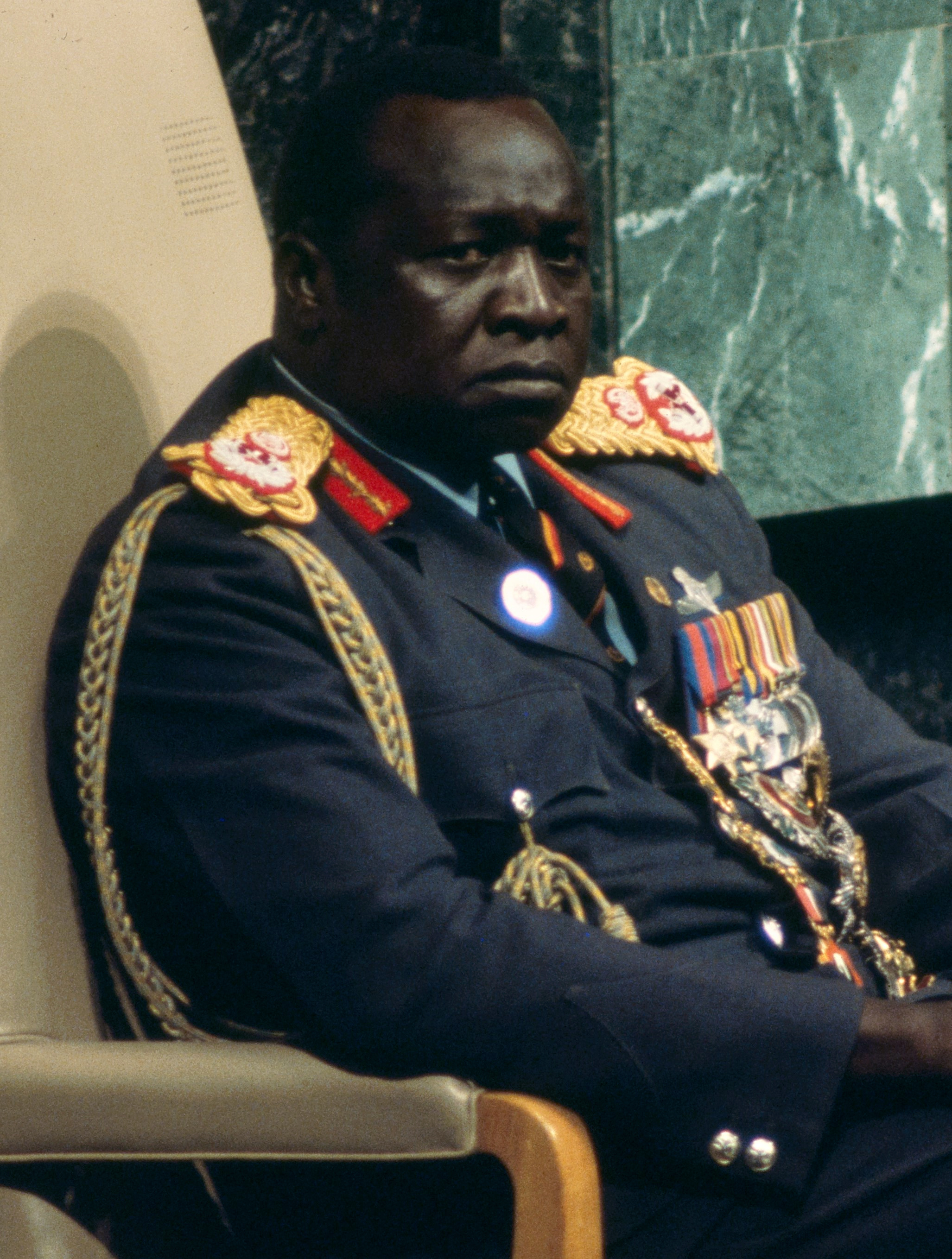
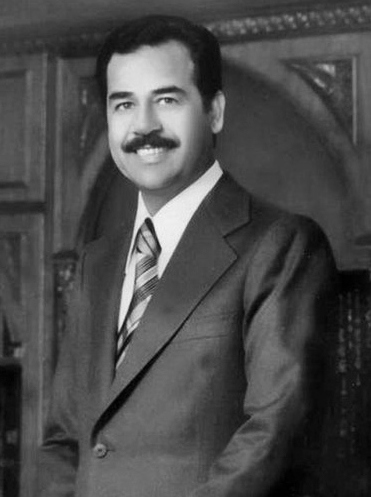
Suharto (left), Idi Amin (center), and Saddam Hussein (right) are examples of dictatorial leaders who used the title "President".

In dictatorships, the title of president is frequently taken by self-appointed or military-backed leaders. Such is the case in many states: Idi Amin in Uganda, Mobutu Sese Seko in Zaire, Ferdinand Marcos in the Philippines, Suharto in Indonesia, and Saddam Hussein in Iraq are some examples. Other presidents in authoritarian states have wielded only symbolic or no power such as Craveiro Lopes in Portugal and Joaquín Balaguer under the "Trujillo era" of the Dominican Republic.

President for life is a title assumed by some dictators to try to ensure their authority or legitimacy is never questioned. Presidents like Alexandre Pétion, Rafael Carrera, Josip Broz Tito, and François Duvalier died in office. Kim Il Sung was named Eternal leader of the Republic after his death.

=== Collective presidency ===
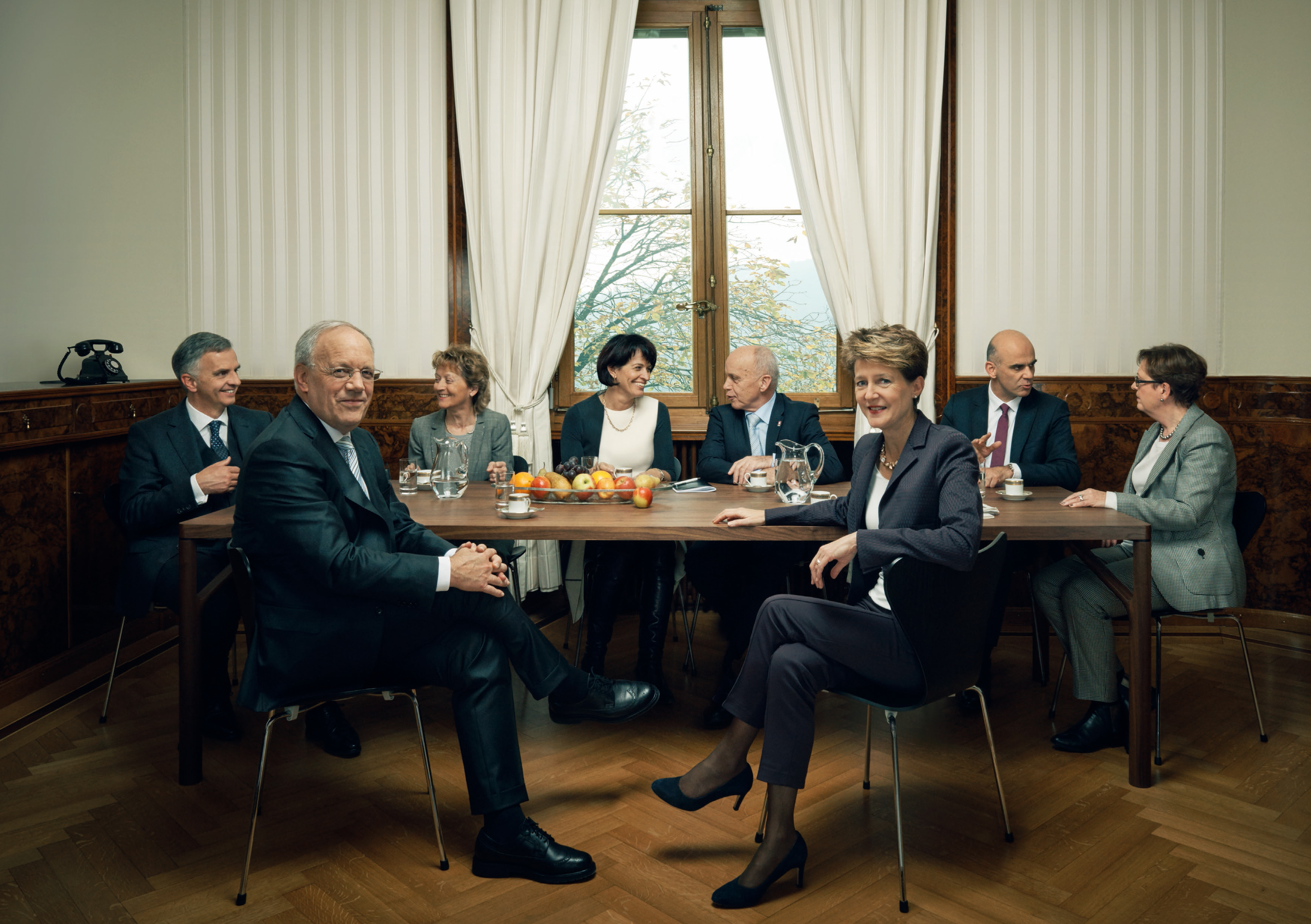
The seven-member Swiss Federal Council serves as collective head of government and state of Switzerland.

Only a tiny minority of modern republics do not have a single head of state. Some examples of this are:

- Switzerland, where the headship of state is collectively vested in the seven-member Swiss Federal Council, although there is also a president of the Confederation, who is a member of the Federal Council elected by the Federal Assembly (the Swiss parliament) for a year (constitutional convention mandates that the post rotates every New Year's Day).
- The Captains Regent of San Marino elected by the Grand and General Council.
- The Co-presidency of Nicaragua, since 2025 the headship of state and government is shared between two co-presidents with equal powers, by constitution a male and a female.
- In the former Soviet Union from 1922 until 1938 there existed an office of collective head of state known as the Central Executive Committee of the Soviet Union that consisted of four and later seven chairmen representing the central executive committees of all union republics from Russia, Belarus, Ukraine, Trans-Caucasusia and from 1925 Uzbekistan, Turkmenistan, Tajikistan. From 1927 until 1989 however, real power was exercised by the General Secretary of the Soviet Communist Party. After 1938, the Presidium of the Supreme Soviet executed powers of a collective head of state, and its chairman was often called "president" in the West, though a singular head of state named "president" was later established in 1990.
- Yugoslavia after the death of Josip Broz Tito, where a presidency consisting of members from each federal unit ruled the country until its breakup.
- Ukraine, in 1918–1920 there existed Directorate composed of seven leaders of parliamentary factions and served as a collective head of state.
- The three-member Presidency of Bosnia and Herzegovina contains a member from each of the country's largest ethnic groups and serves as the collective head of state of Bosnia and Herzegovina
- National Council of Government in Uruguay from 1952 until 1967
- Junta of National Reconstruction in Nicaragua from 1979 until 1985

== One-party states ==
=== People's Republic of China ===
Xi Jinping, the President of China

The president of China is the state representative of the People's Republic of China. While the office has many of the characteristics of a nominal head of state, the Constitution of China does not define it as such. Under the country's constitution, the presidency is a largely ceremonial office with no real power. However, since 1993, as a matter of convention, the presidency has been held simultaneously by the General Secretary of the Chinese Communist Party, the top leader in the single-party system.

Between 1982 and 2019, the Chinese constitution stipulated that the president could not serve more than two consecutive terms. Before the Cultural Revolution, as well as since March 2018, there were no term limits attached to this office. Under Xi Jinping's administration, the term limits of the presidency were abolished, but its powers and ceremonial role remained unchanged. In March 2023, Xi secured an unprecedented third term as president.

The title of the office (Chinese: 国家主席; pinyin: Guójiā Zhǔxí), which literally translates to "state chairman", was unchanged in the Chinese text, but a new English translation of "President of the People's Republic of China" has been adopted since the restoration in 1982. In 2025, the U.S. government partially resume using the term "State Chairman" instead of the president of China.

=== Lao People's Democratic Republic ===
In Laos, which is a one-party state similar to that of China, the president is elected by the Laotian National Assembly, and is considered to be the head of state. Since 1998, however, presidential officeholders in Laos often occupy their position as General Secretary of the Lao People's Revolutionary Party concurrently, and thus exercise political power via that role. In accordance with the current Laotian Constitution (rev. in 2015), the president may not serve more than 2 consecutive terms, and elections are to take place every 5 years.

The president of Laos is the de jure commander-in-chief of the Lao People's Armed Forces. They also possess the authority (with the consent of the national assembly) to appoint the prime minister and vice president, as well as other roles. The current president of Laos, elected in March 2021, is Thongloun Sisoulith.

=== Republic of Cuba ===
In Cuba, officially the Republic of Cuba, the president, recognized officially as the president of the Republic, is considered to be the head of state. It is the second highest office in Cuba, but still ranks below the First Secretary of the Communist Party of Cuba. The current president, Miguel Díaz-Canel, however, has held both titles concurrently since April 2021, having been granted the rank of First Secretary by the National Assembly of People's Power following the resignation and retirement of Raúl Castro.

The president is elected by representatives within Cuba's parliament, the National Assembly of People's Power, and in accordance with the Cuban Constitution, which was rewritten in February 2019 following a national referendum, is limited to two consecutive five-year terms. The president is also considered to be responsible for the National Assembly. The current president was elected by the National Assembly in December 2019 with an almost unanimous vote, and was re-elected in a similar fashion in April 2023.

== Presidential symbols ==
As the country's head of state, in most countries the president is entitled to certain perquisites, and may have a prestigious residence, often a lavish mansion or palace, sometimes more than one (e.g. summer and winter residences, or a country retreat) Customary symbols of office may include an official uniform, decorations, a presidential seal, coat of arms, flag and other visible accessories, as well as military honours such as gun salutes, ruffles and flourishes, and a presidential guard. A common presidential symbol is the presidential sash worn most often by presidents in Latin America and Africa as a symbol of the continuity of the office.

== Presidential chronologies ==
United Nations member countries in columns, other entities at the beginning:

- European Commission
- List of presidents of European Union institutions
- List of presidents of the Soviet Union (Leaders)
- List of longest-serving presidents

== Titles for non-heads of state ==
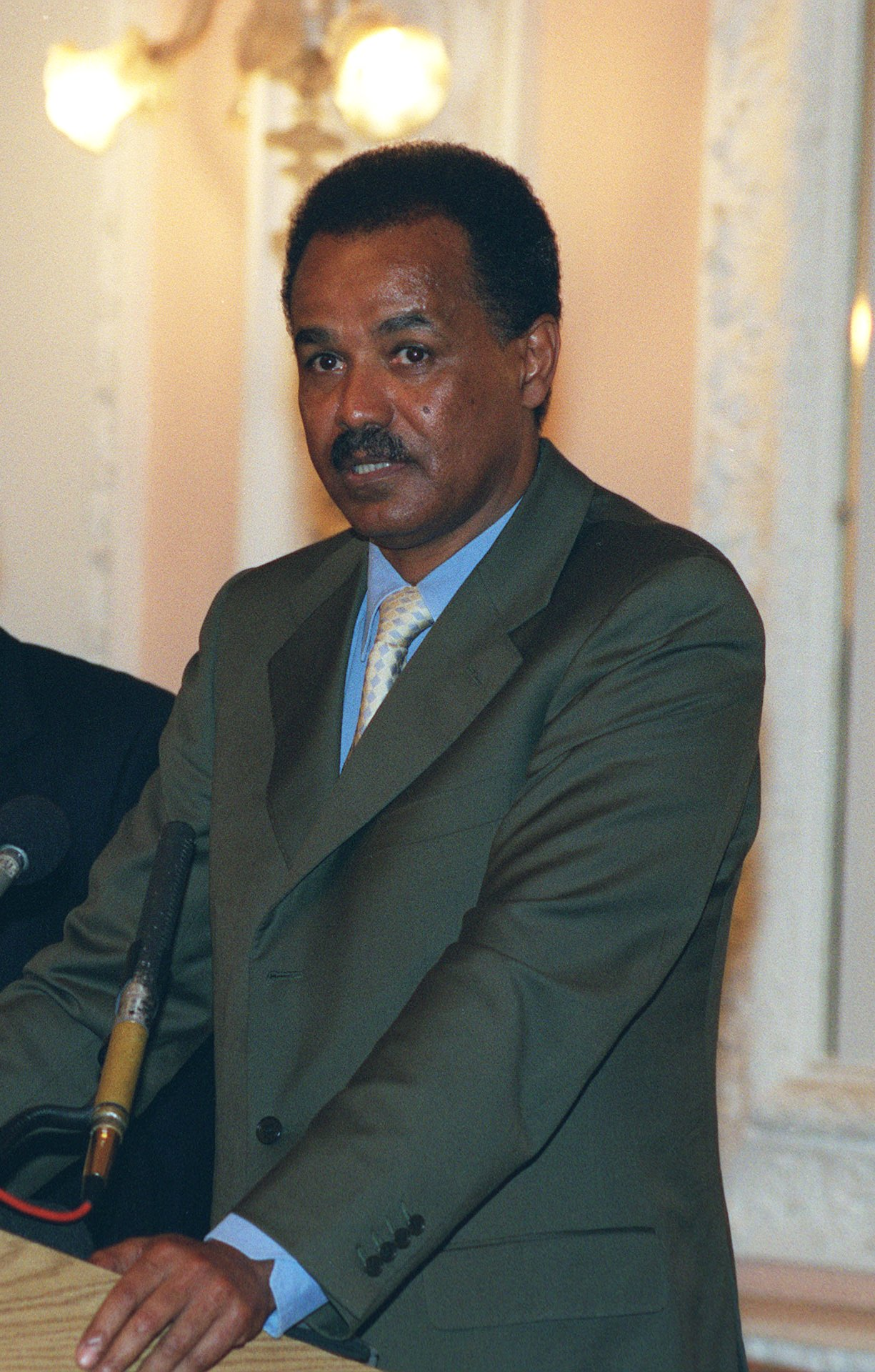
President Isaias Afwerki of the State of Eritrea giving a press briefing in the capital Asmara, 2002

=== As head of government ===
Some countries with parliamentary systems use a term meaning/translating as "president" (in some languages indistinguishable from chairman) for the head of parliamentary government, often as President of the Government, President of the Council of Ministers or President of the Executive Council.

However, such an official is explicitly not the president of the country. These officials are called "president" using an older sense of the word, to denote the fact that the official heads the cabinet. A separate head of state generally exists in their country who instead serves as the president or monarch of the country.

Thus, such officials are really premiers, and to avoid confusion are often described simply as 'prime minister' when being mentioned internationally.

There are several examples for this kind of presidency:

- The prime minister of Spain is officially referred to as the president of the Government of Spain, and informally known as the "president". Spain is also a kingdom with a reigning king.
- The official title of the Italian prime minister is President of the Council of Ministers (Italian Presidente del Consiglio dei Ministri)
- Under the French Third and the Fourth Republics, the "President of the Council" (of ministers – a prime minister) was the head of government, with the president of the Republic a largely symbolic figurehead.
- From 1963 until 1992, the head of government of the Socialist Federal Republic of Yugoslavia was the president of the Federal Executive Council after the 1963 Constitution abolished the office of Prime Minister of Yugoslavia and transferred its functions to the president of the Federal Executive Council. Despite this, foreign media sources continued to refer to individuals holding the office of President of the Federal Executive Council as being the "Prime Minister of Yugoslavia".
- The prime minister of the Irish Free State from 1922 to 1937 was titled President of the Executive Council of the Irish Free State. At the same time, the Irish Free State was a constitutional monarchy with a reigning monarch, the king of Ireland, as well as a resident governor-general carrying out many head of state functions.
- Under the constitutional monarchies of Brazil and Portugal, the president of the Council of Ministers (Portuguese Presidente do Conselho de Ministros) was the head of government, with the Monarch being the head of State. Under the Portuguese First and Second Republics, the head of government was the president of the Ministry (Portuguese Presidente do Ministério) and then the president of the Council of Ministers, with the president of the Republic as the head of State.
- The official title of the Croatian prime minister is President of the Government of the Republic of Croatia (Croatian: Predsjednik Vlade Republike Hrvatske).
- The official title of the Polish prime minister is President of the Council of Ministers (Polish Prezes Rady Ministrów).
- In British constitutional practice, the chairman of an Executive Council, acting in such a capacity, is known as a president of the Executive Council. Usually this person is the Governor and it always stays like that.
- Between 1918 and 1934, Estonia had no separate head of state. Both prime ministers (1918–1920) and state elders (1920–1934) often translated as "presidents") were elected by the parliament.
- The head of government of Iran is styled as the "president". The Iranian head of state is the supreme leader, to whom the president is subordinate.

=== Other executive positions ===
==== Judicial title ====
In Finland, the heads of ordinary Appeals Courts, the Supreme Court and Supreme Administrative Court are titled presidentti. To disambiguate, full titles are used, e.g. korkeimman oikeuden presidentti "President of the Supreme Court", vs. korkeimman hallinto-oikeuden presidentti "President of the Supreme Administrative Court", vs. tasavallan presidentti "President of the Republic".

==== Sub-national ====
President can also be the title of the chief executive at a lower administrative level, such as the parish presidents of the parishes of the U.S. state of Louisiana, the presiding member of city council for villages in the U.S. state of Illinois, or the municipal presidents of Mexico's municipalities. Perhaps the best known sub-national presidents are the borough presidents of the five boroughs of New York City.

===== Poland =====
In Poland, the president of the city (Polish: Prezydent miasta) is the executive authority of the municipality elected in direct elections, the equivalent of the mayor. The Office of the President (Mayor) is also found in Germany and Switzerland.

===== Russia =====
Governors of ethnic republics in the Russian Federation used to have the title of President, occasionally alongside other, secondary titles such as Chairman of the Government (also used by Prime Minister of Russia). This likely reflects the origin of Russian republics as homelands for various ethnic groups: while all federal subjects of Russia are currently de jure equal, their predecessors, the ASSRs, used to enjoy more privileges than the ordinary krais and oblasts of the RSFSR (such as greater representation in the Soviet of Nationalities). Thus, the ASSRs and their eventual successors would have more in common with nation-states than with ordinary administrative divisions, at least in spirit, and would choose titles accordingly.

Over the course of the 2010s the presidents of Russian republics would progressively change their title to that of Head (Russian: глава), a proposition suggested by the president of Chechnya Ramzan Kadyrov and later made law by the Parliament of Russia and President Dmitriy Medvedev in 2010. Despite this, however, presidents of Tatarstan resisted the move, before 2023, where it was switched to the Head or Rais, the latter of which could be translated from Tatar as "President".

===== United Kingdom =====
The lord president of the Council is one of the Great Officers of State in the United Kingdom who presides over meetings of British Privy Council; the Cabinet headed by the prime minister is technically a committee of the council, and all decisions of the Cabinet are formally approved through Orders in Council. Although the lord president is a member of the Cabinet, the position is largely a ceremonial one and is traditionally given to either the leader of the House of Commons or the leader of the House of Lords.

Historically the president of the Board of Trade was a cabinet member.

====== British dependencies ======
In Alderney, the elected head of government is called the president of the States of Alderney.

In the Isle of Man, there is a president of Tynwald.

===== Spain =====
In Spain, the executive leaders of the autonomous communities (regions) are called presidents. In each community, they can be called Presidente de la Comunidad or Presidente del Consejo among others. They are elected by their respective regional assemblies and have similar powers to a state president or governor.

==== Deputies ====
Below a president, there can be a number of or "vice presidents" (or occasionally "deputy presidents") and sometimes several "assistant presidents" or "assistant vice presidents", depending on the organisation and its size. These posts do not hold the same power but more of a subordinate position to the president. However, power can be transferred in special circumstances to the deputy or vice president. Normally vice presidents hold some power and special responsibilities below that of the president. The difference between vice/deputy presidents and assistant/associate vice presidents is the former are legally allowed to run an organisation, exercising the same powers (as well as being second in command) whereas the latter are not.

=== Legislatures ===
In some countries the speaker of their unicameral legislatures, or of one or both houses of bicameral legislatures, the speakers have the title of president of "the body", as in the case of Spain, where the speaker of the Congress is the president of the Congress of Deputies and the Speaker of the Senate is the president of the Senate.

=== Judiciary ===
The term 'President' is usually used in judiciary as chief justice of constitutional courts.

==== France ====
In French legal terminology, the president of a court consisting of multiple judges is the foremost judge; he chairs the meeting of the court and directs the debates (and is thus addressed as "Mrs President", "Madame la Présidente", "Mr President", or "Monsieur le Président"). In general, a court comprises several chambers, each with its own president; thus the most senior of these is called the "first president" (as in: "the First President of the Court of Cassation is the most senior judge in France"). Similarly in English legal practice the most senior judge in each division uses this title (e.g. President of the Family Division, President of the Court of Appeal).

==== Spain ====
In the Spanish Judiciary, the leader of a court of multiples judges is called president of the court. The same happens with the different bodies of the Spanish judicial system, where we can find a president of the Supreme Court, a president of the National Court and presidents in the Regional High Courts of Justice and in the Provincial Courts. The body that rules over the Judiciary in Spain is the General Council of the Judiciary, and its president is the president of the Supreme Court, which is normally called President of the Supreme Court and of the GCJ.

The Constitutional Court is not part of the Judiciary, but the leader of it is called President of the Constitutional Court.

==== United Kingdom ====
In the recently established Supreme Court of the United Kingdom, the most senior judge is called the President of the Supreme Court. The lady/lord president of the Court of Session is head of the judiciary in Scotland, and presiding judge (and Senator) of the College of Justice and Court of Session, as well as being Lady/Lord Justice General of Scotland and head of the High Court of Justiciary, the offices having been combined in 1784.

== Spousal titles ==
Titles for a president's spouse, if female, have ranged from "Marquise" to "Lady" to simply "Mrs." (or "Ms."). If male the title of the president's spouse may be "Marquis", "Lord", or merely "Mr.".

=== United States ===
President George Washington's wife, Martha Washington, was often called "Lady Washington". By the 1850s in the United States, the term "lady" had changed from a title of nobility to a term of address for a respected and well-mannered woman. The use of "First Lady" to refer to the wife of the president of the United States was popularized about the time of the US Civil War. Dolley Madison, the wife of President James Madison, was remembered after her death in 1849 by President Zachary Taylor as "truly our First Lady for a half a century". First ladies are usually referred to simply as "Mrs. [last name]".

== See also ==
- Eternal leaders of North Korea
- Presidential system
- Presidents Day
- Requirements for becoming a president
- Vice president
- First Lady

=== Head of state ===
- Governor-General
- Head of state
- List of state leaders
- Monarch
- Supreme Leader (disambiguation)

=== Other head of government ===
- Minister-President (a head of government, not of state)
- Prime minister

== Sources ==
- Lee, Sidney, ed. (1891). "Hungerford, Thomas" . Dictionary of National Biography. Vol. 28. London: Smith, Elder & Co.
