= Natural-born-citizen clause =

Natural born citizen clause for executive office

A natural-born-citizen clause is a provision in some constitutions that certain officers, usually the head of state, must be "natural-born" citizens of that state, but there is no universally accepted meaning for the term natural-born. The constitutions of a number of countries contain such a clause but may define or interpret the term natural-born citizen differently. Many countries specify citizenship since birth as a requirement to hold certain offices. This is often described using the natural born phraseology and sometimes further qualified as requiring physical birth within the country's territory (jus soli) and/or requiring that one or both natural parents be a citizen of the country at the time of birth (jus sanguinis).

== Nations that have the requirement ==
=== Africa ===
==== Angola ====
Article 110 of the 2010 Constitution provides that "Natural born Angolan citizens of over 35 years of age, living in the country for the last 10 years, and enjoying full civil and political rights shall be eligible to the post of President of the Republic."

==== Ghana ====
According to Chapter 8, Article 62 of the 1992 Constitution of Ghana, a person shall not be qualified for election as the president of Ghana unless that person is a citizen of Ghana by birth.

==== Kenya ====
The person to be elected as president should be a Kenyan citizen by birth.

==== Liberia ====
To be eligible for office under the Liberia Constitution, a presidential candidate must:

- be a natural born citizen of Liberia" (per Art, 27)(b) of the Constitution; citizenship is limited to "persons who are Negroes or of Negro descent".

==== Nigeria ====
Chapter VI, Part I, Section 131 of the constitution states that a person may be qualified for election of the office of the president if they are a citizen of Nigeria by birth.

==== Uganda ====
Qualifications of the President according to Constitution of Uganda. (Article 102) A person to qualify for election as president must be— (a) a citizen of Uganda by birth; (b) not less than thirty-five and not more than seventy-five years of age; and (c) qualified to be a member of Parliament.

=== Asia ===
==== Indonesia ====
According to the Article 6 of the 1945 Indonesia constitution, presidential and vice presidential candidates must have been citizens since birth who have never voluntarily acquired another citizenship.

==== Philippines ====
Article VII, Section 3 of the 1987 Constitution provides that no person may be elected president unless "he or she is a natural-born citizen of the Philippines".

==== Syria ====
A new constitution was approved in February 2012. Article 84 of Syria's 2012 constitution requires that candidates for the presidency must:

1. Be Syrian by birth, of parents who are Syrians by birth

==== Turkmenistan ====
Requirements for candidates for president of Turkmenistan include the following:

- Must have been born in Turkmenistan
- Must be fluent in the Turkmen language
- Must have resided in Turkmenistan for the past 15 consecutive years

=== Europe ===
==== Albania ====
As of Article 89 of the Albanian Constitution sets the following qualifications for holding the presidency, to be a natural-born citizen of the Albanian Republic, to be at least forty years old and to be a resident in the Republic of Albania for at least ten years.

==== Belarus ====
In order to be able to run for office, a candidate must be a Belarusian citizen by birth that is over thirty-five years old. The candidate must also have resided within the republic for ten years and able to cast a ballot legally. The provisions are set down in Article 80 of the Constitution.

==== Bulgaria ====
According to Section 2 of Article 93 of the Bulgarian Constitution only a natural-born Bulgarian citizen - meaning a Bulgarian citizen by birth - is eligible to be elected President.

==== Finland ====
According to the first paragraph of Section 54 of the Finnish Constitution, "The President shall be a native-born Finnish citizen."

=== North America ===
==== Costa Rica ====
According to Article 131 of the Constitution, the president and vice presidents of the Republic must be Costa Rican by birth and citizens in exercise.

==== Dominican Republic ====
The Dominican Constitution in its Article 123 provides the President of the Republic must be a Dominican by origin or birth.

==== Honduras ====
To be eligible to run for president in Honduras, the candidate is required to be a natural-born Honduran.

==== Mexico ====
The constitution of Mexico requires the candidate to be natural-born citizen of Mexico with at least one parent who is a natural-born citizen of Mexico. The person should be at least 35 years of age and should have resided in Mexico for at least 20 years in his entire lifetime and for the entire year before the election. The person should not be a secretary or under-secretary of state, attorney general, or governor of a state at least 6 months prior to the election.

==== United States ====
The president and vice president must be a natural-born citizen of the United States, at least 35 years old, and have been a resident of the United States of America for at least 14 years.

=== South America ===
==== Argentina ====
Article 89 of the Argentine Constitution establishes the requirements for becoming president. The President must be a natural-born citizen of the country.

==== Brazil ====
Article 14, paragraph 3 of the Constitution requires a candidate to be:

- Born in Brazil, or a native citizen.
- Eligible to vote.
- Registered to vote.
- Living in electoral district.
- Member of a political party.
- Minimum age of 35.

==== Chile ====
The Constitution of 1980 and its 2005 amendment establishes the requirements for becoming president. The president must be a natural-born citizen of the country, or else born overseas when one of his or her parents or grandparents is a Chilean national. The president must also be at least 35 years old.

==== Colombia ====
Colombian Constitution of 1991 Article 191: states that the president must be a natural born citizen of Colombia and at least 30 years of age.

==== Ecuador ====
The Ecuadorian constitution of 2008 states in Art. 142.- The President of the Republic must be Ecuadorian by birth, have reached thirty-five years of age on the date of registration of his candidacy, be in enjoyment of political rights and not be subject to any of the disabilities or prohibitions established in the Constitution.

==== Uruguay ====
The Constitution amendment establishes the requirements for becoming president. Article 151 establishes that the President must be a natural-born citizen of the country, or have been born to an Uruguayan citizen if born abroad. The President must also be at least 35 years old and be registered in the National Civic Registry.

==== Venezuela ====
According to articles 227 and 229 of the Constitution of Venezuela, adopted in 1999, the following requirements must be met in order to become President of Venezuela:

- Being a Venezuelan citizen from birth and possessing no other nationality.

== See also ==
- Jus sanguinis
- List of presidential qualifications by country
