= Executive council (Commonwealth countries) =

Constitutional organ in Commonwealth countries

An executive council is a constitutional organ found in a number of Commonwealth countries, where it exercises executive power and (notionally) advises the governor, governor-general, or lieutenant governor, and will typically enact decisions through an Order in Council. In several Commonwealth countries, the executive council is usually referred to as the cabinet. However, the use of the word cabinet as a synonym for the executive council is not universally practised throughout the Commonwealth of Nations, with some Commonwealth countries using the term cabinet to refer to a distinct group of high-ranking officials.

Executive councillors are informally called "ministers". Some executive councils, especially in Australia and the provinces and territories of Canada, are chaired by a President or a Vice-President. In other Commonwealth countries there is no formal president of the executive council, although meetings are held in the presence of the governor-general, governor or president (except in rare cases) and decisions require his or her assent.

These councils have almost the same functions as the privy councils in Canada and the United Kingdom, and decisions of the cabinet gain legal effect by being formally adopted by the executive council, if the cabinet itself is not also the executive council. (Note: In addition to the monarch of Canada, the Privy Council of Canada also advises the Governor General of Canada in their role as the monarch's viceregal representative.)

== Current executive councils ==
=== Australia ===
- Australia: Federal Executive Council, the formal body holding executive authority under the Australian constitution.
  - New South Wales: Executive Council of New South Wales, the body which exercises the supreme executive authority in New South Wales.
  - Queensland: Executive Council of Queensland
  - Tasmania: Executive Council of Tasmania
  - South Australia: Executive Council of South Australia
  - Western Australia: Executive Council of Western Australia
  - Victoria: Executive Council of Victoria

=== Other Commonwealth Countries ===
- Canada: Executive councils in Canada (more commonly known as cabinets) are constitutional organs of the provinces; they are headed by the provincial lieutenant governor. Territories also have executive councils, which are headed by the territorial commissioner. At the federal level, the Cabinet is a subcommittee of the King's Privy Council for Canada.
- Isle of Man: The Council of Ministers of the Isle of Man is the executive body of the Isle of Man, formerly known as the Executive Council of the Isle of Man from 1949 to 1990.
- Nigeria: Federal Executive Council of Nigeria, an alternative name to the Cabinet of Nigeria.
  - State executive councils in Nigeria, name for the cabinets of Nigerian states.
- New Zealand: Executive Council of New Zealand, the body which serves the functions of the Cabinet in New Zealand.
- Papua New Guinea: National Executive Council of Papua New Guinea, an alternative name to the Cabinet of Papua New Guinea.
- Falkland Islands: Executive Council of the Falkland Islands, the policy making body of the Government of the Falkland Islands.

== Former executive councils ==
- : Executive Council of Ceylon (1804–1947) - replaced by the Cabinet of Sri Lanka following independence
- British North America
  - Lower Canada: Executive Council of Lower Canada (1791–1841)
  - Upper Canada: Executive Council of Upper Canada (1791–1841)
  - Province of Canada: Executive Council of the Province of Canada (1841–1867), replaced the executive councils for Upper Canada and Lower Canada; and was later replaced by the Privy Council for Canada
  - Colony of British Columbia: Executive Council of the Colony of British Columbia (1858–1871)
  - Colony of Vancouver Island: Executive Council of Vancouver Island, absorbed by the Executive Council of the Colony of British Columbia in 1866.
- British Honduras: Executive Council of British Honduras (1840–1961)
- Fiji: Executive Council, a form of government in Fiji.
- Straits Settlements: Executive Council of the Straits Settlements (1867–1946)
- Singapore: Executive Council of Singapore (1946–1959)
- Ireland: Executive Council of the Irish Free State (1922–1937)

== Other executive councils ==
- : Executive Council of Hong Kong is a body that holds executive authority in Hong Kong. Hong Kong was a colony/British Dependent Territory of the United Kingdom from 1841 to 1997, when the territory was transferred to China. Although it is no longer a member of the Commonwealth of Nations, the Executive Council still functions. In accordance with the Oaths and Declarations Ordinance, the members of the Executive Council should take the Oath of Fidelity after his/her appointment and promise not to reveal any matters being discussed in the council. The aim of this principle was to ensure that the members could speak freely without any fears and pressure, so as to facilitate the Chief Executive to receive prompt and objective advices in the policy making process.

== See also ==
- Council of Ministers
- Legislative council
- Privy Council of the United Kingdom
- King's Privy Council for Canada
