= President of the Executive Council =

President of the Executive Council may refer to:

- The President of the Federal Executive Council of Yugoslavia, the full title of the head of the central government of Yugoslavia from 1963 to 1992
- The President of the Executive Council of the Irish Free State, Head of government of the Irish Free State (1922–37), in fact the prime minister of the Irish Free State
- A premier of a Canadian province (see Premier (Canada))

== See also ==
- President of the Government
- President of the Council of Ministers
- Vice-President of the Executive Council
