= List of presidential qualifications by country =

This is a list of qualifications that potential candidates must possess in order to stand for election as president of a country.

== Afghanistan ==
Article 62 of the Constitution of Afghanistan of 2004 states that a candidate for the office of President:

- be a Muslim citizen of Afghanistan, born of Afghan parents;
- not be a citizen of another country;
- be at least 40 years old when declaring candidacy;
- not have been convicted of crimes against humanity, a criminal act or deprived of civil rights by court;
- not have previously served more than two terms as president.

== Albania ==
The 1998 Constitution, Article 86, Section 2 "Only an Albanian citizen by birth who has been a resident in Albania for not less than the past 10 years and who has reached the age of 40 may be elected President."

== Algeria ==
Article 73, section 1 of the Constitution, 1996, provides that "To be eligible to the Presidency of the Republic, the candidate should:

- have, solely, the Algerian nationality by origin;
- be a Muslim;
- be more than forty (40) years-old the day of the election;
- enjoy full civil and political rights;
- prove the Algerian nationality of the spouse;
- (if born before July 1942) justify his participation in the 1st of November 1954 Revolution;
- and if born after July 1942, "justify the non-involvement of the parents of the candidate in actions hostile to the 1st of November 1954 Revolution";
- submit a public declaration of his personal and real estate existing either within Algeria or abroad.

Section 2 provides that "Other conditions are prescribed by the law."

== Angola ==
Article 110 of the 2010 Constitution provides that "Natural born Angolan citizens of over 35 years of age, living in the country for the last 10 years, and enjoying full civil and political rights shall be eligible to the post of President of the Republic."

== Argentina ==
Article 89 of the Argentine Constitution provides that "To be elected President or Vice-President of the Nation it is necessary to have been born in the Argentine territory, or to be the son of a native born citizen if born in a foreign country; and to have the other qualifications required to be elected senator. Section 55 requires that to be elected Senator, one must "have attained to the age of 30 years"; "been six years a citizen of the Nation" and "have an annual income of two thousand strong pesos or similar revenues".

== Armenia ==
Article 124, Chapter 5 of the 1995 Constitution amended June 12, 2015: "Everyone having attained the age of forty, having held citizenship of only the Republic of Armenia for the preceding six years, having been permanently residing in the Republic of Armenia for the preceding six years, having the right of suffrage and having command of the Armenian language may be elected as President of the Republic."

== Austria ==
Article 60, section (3) of the 1983 Constitution provides: "Only a person who has House of Representatives franchise and was thirty five years old before the first of January of the year in which the election is held can be elected Federal President." Members of reigning houses or of formerly regnant families were excluded from eligibility until 2011.

== Azerbaijan ==
Article 100 of the Constitution states that The President of the Republic of Azerbaijan must be a citizen, must have resided in the territory without interruption for more than 10 years, must enjoy the right to vote, must never have been tried for a major crime, must have no commitments towards other States, must have benefited from higher education and must not have dual citizenship.

== Bangladesh ==
Article 48, section 4 of the Constitution provides three factors which disqualify one for the presidency:

- being less than 35 years old;
- not being qualified to be elected to parliament,
- and having previously been impeached under the current Constitution.

Article 66 of the constitution provides factors which disqualify one from being elected to Parliament:

- having been declared by a competent court to be of unsound mind;
- being an undischarged insolvent;
- acquires the citizenship of, or affirms or acknowledges allegiance to, a foreign state;
- has been, on conviction for a criminal offence involving moral turpitude, sentenced to imprisonment for a term of not less than two years, unless a period of five years has elapsed since his release;
- has been convicted of any offence under the Bangladesh Collaborators (Special Tribunals) Order, 1972;
- holds any office of profit in the service of the Republic other than an office which is declared by law not to be disqualified its holder;
- or is disqualified for such election by or under any law.

== Belarus ==
The qualifications for election to parliament are that one be a citizen and be at least 25 years old (which is superseded by the presidential requirement of 35 years). Further, one can be states that any citizen of Belarus who is 35 years old, eligible to vote, and has resided in Belarus for 10 years may be elected president.

== Brazil ==
Article 14, Section III (3) of the Constitution requires a candidate to be:

- Must be born in Brazil, or a native citizen.
- Eligible to vote.
- Registered to vote.
- Living in electoral district.
- Member of a political party.
- Minimum age of 35.

== Bulgaria ==
Article 93, Section 2 of the Constitution requires a candidate to be, at the time of election:

- a natural-born citizen;
- at least 40 years of age;
- not a citizen of another country;
- not serving a sentence of imprisonment;
- not under judicial interdiction;
- a resident of Bulgaria for at least five years.

== Colombia ==
Article 191 of the Colombian Constitution requires that to be president one must be Colombian by birth ("colombiano por nacimiento"), have full citizenship ("ciudadano en ejercicio") and older than 30. ("mayor de treinta años").

== China ==
Article 79 of the Constitution of China provides that citizens who have the right to vote and stand for election and who have reached the age of 45 are eligible for election as president or vice president.

== Czech Republic ==
A candidate for an election must be a citizen, has attained the age of 40 years and has active right to vote.

== Estonia ==
An Estonian citizen by birth who has attained forty years of age may be nominated as a candidate for President of the Republic. A person who is serving as President of the Republic for a second consecutive term shall not be nominated as a candidate for President of the Republic. A person in active service in the Defence Forces shall not be nominated as a candidate for President of the Republic.

== Finland ==
Under the Constitution of Finland, executive power is vested in the Finnish Government and the president, with the latter possessing only residual powers. The president is directly elected by universal suffrage for a term of six years. Since 1994, no president may be elected for more than two consecutive terms. The president must be a native-born Finnish citizen. The presidential office was established in the Constitution Act of 1919.

== France ==
The required personal qualifications for a candidate for the presidential elections are the same as those for any other official election, as set forth in the French Electoral code (Code électoral). A candidate for an election must be:

- a French citizen;
- have attained the age of 18 years;
- be qualified to vote;
- not be ineligible by reason of criminal conviction or judicial decision;
- and have a bank account.

Law No. 62-1292 of 6 November 1962 on the election of the President by universal suffrage (Loi n°62-1292 du 6 novembre 1962 relative à l'élection du Président de la République au suffrage universel) further requires presidential candidates to be nominated by at least five hundred qualified elected officials, such as members of Parliament and mayors.

In 1974, the French Electoral code was modified (Code électoral) to decrease to 18 years the minimum age of a candidate, which had previously been 21.

== Germany ==
Article 54, section 1, of the German constitution states that "Any German who is entitled to vote in Bundestag elections and has attained the age of forty may be elected". Article 116, section 1, defines "German" as "a person who possesses German citizenship or who has been admitted to the territory of the German Reich within the boundaries of December 31, 1937 as a refugee or expellee of German ethnic origin or as the spouse or descendant of such person."

== Iceland ==
Articles 4 and 5 of the constitution set the following qualifications for holding the presidency:

- meet the qualifications specified for parliamentarians;
- be at least 35 years old;
- have at least 1,500 commendations

== India ==
Article 58 of the constitution sets the principle qualifications one must meet to be eligible to the office of the president. A President must be:

- a citizen of India;
- of 35 years of age or above;
- qualified to become a member of the Lok Sabha.

A person shall not be eligible for election as president if he holds any office of profit under the Government of India or the government of any state or under any local government or other authority subject to the control of any of the said governments. Certain office-holders, however, are permitted to stand as presidential candidates. These are:

- The current Vice President.
- The Governor of any State.
- A minister of the union or of any state (Including Prime Minister and Chief Ministers).

In the event that the vice president, a state governor or a minister is elected president, they are considered to have vacated their previous office on the date they begin serving as president.

== Indonesia ==
The 1945 Constitution of Indonesia requires that the candidate for president and candidate for vice president must be an Indonesian citizen from birth and have never accepted another citizenship of his own free will, have never betrayed the state, and be physically and mentally capable of carrying out his duties and obligations as president and vice president. Further conditions are regulated by law. According to the Law No. 7 of 2017, the requirements for presidential and vice presidential candidates must:

1. fear God Almighty;
2. Indonesian citizen since his birth and has never received another citizenship of his own free will;
3. the husband or wife of the candidate for President and the husband or wife of the candidate for Vice President are Indonesian citizens;
4. have never betrayed the state and have never committed a crime of corruption and other serious crimes;
5. able spiritually and physically to carry out the duties and obligations as President and Vice President and free from narcotics abuse;
6. residing in the territory of the Unitary State of the Republic of Indonesia;
7. has reported his wealth to the agency authorized to examine the wealth report of state administrators;
8. not currently having debt obligations individually and/or as a legal entity which is their responsibility which is detrimental to state finances;
9. not being declared bankrupt based on a court decision;
10. never commit a disgraceful act;
11. not being nominated as a member of the DPR, DPD, or DPRD;
12. registered as a voter;
13. has a taxpayer identification number and has carried out the obligation to pay taxes for the last 5 (five) years as evidenced by an annual income tax return for individual taxpayers;
14. have never served as President or Vice President for 2 (two) terms in the same office;
15. loyal to Pancasila, the 1945 Constitution of the Republic of Indonesia, the Unitary State of the Republic of Indonesia, and Bhinneka Tunggal Ika;
16. has never been sentenced to imprisonment based on a court decision that has obtained permanent legal force for committing a crime punishable by imprisonment of 5 (five) years or more;
17. at least 40 (forty) years old;
18. with a minimum education of high school graduation, madrasah aliyah, vocational high school, vocational madrasah aliyah, or other equivalent school;
19. not a former member of the banned Indonesian Communist Party, including its mass organizations, or not a person directly involved in the G.30.S/PKI; and
20. has a vision, mission, and program in implementing the government of the Republic of Indonesia.

== Mexico ==
The constitution of Mexico requires the candidate to be natural-born citizen of Mexico with at least one parent who is a natural-born citizen of Mexico. The person should be at least 35 years of age and should have resided in Mexico for at least 20 years. The person should not be a secretary or under-secretary of state, attorney general, or governor of a state at least 6 months prior to the election.

== Maldives ==
The Constitution of the Maldives requires the following for a president: be a Maldivian citizen born to parents who are Maldivian citizens, and who is not also a citizen of a foreign country; be a Muslim, and be a follower of a Sunni school of Islam.

== North Macedonia ==
The Constitution of North Macedonia requires that the president must be a citizen of the Republic of North Macedonia, be over 40 years of age and have lived in North Macedonia for at least ten of the previous fifteen years.

== Pakistan ==
The Constitution of Pakistan sets the principle qualifications that the candidate must meet to be eligible to the office of the president. A President has to be:

- A citizen of Pakistan.
- A Muslim.
- At least 45 years of age.
- Qualified to be elected as member of the National Assembly.

== Philippines ==
Article VII, Section 2 of the 1987 Constitution provides that no person may be elected president unless:

- he or she is a natural-born citizen of the Philippines,
- a registered voter,
- able to read and write,
- at least 40 years of age on the day of the election,
- and a resident of the Philippines for at least 10 years immediately preceding such election.

Natural-born Filipinos are citizens of the Philippines from birth without having to perform any act to acquire or perfect their Philippine citizenship. Those whose fathers or mothers are citizens of the Philippines at the time of their birth and those born before 17 January 1973, of Filipino mothers, who elect Philippine citizenship upon reaching the age of majority are considered natural-born Filipinos. The President of the Philippines (Filipino: Pangulo ng Pilipinas; Spanish: Presidente) is both head of state and head of government of the republic, is leader of the executive branch, and is commander-in-chief of the Armed Forces of the Philippines.

== Poland ==
The Article 127 of the Polish constitution states that only a Polish citizen who, no later than the day of the elections, has attained 35 years of age and has a full electoral rights in elections to the Sejm, may be elected President of the Republic”.

== Portugal ==
Voting citizens of Portuguese origin over 35 years old are eligible for the Presidency of the Republic.

== Romania ==
A candidate for the office must be a Romanian citizen who is at least 35 years old when the elections take place, has the Romanian citizenship and officially lives in Romania.

== Russia ==
Article 81 of the Constitution of Russia states that the candidate must be a citizen of the Russian Federation who is at least 35 years old and has 'permanently resided' in Russia for at least 10 years, and also who does not or did not have a permanent residence permit in another country.

== Republic of Korea ==
Article 67 of the Constitution of the Republic of Korea requires the candidate to be citizen of South Korea at least 40 years of age by the time he or she would assume the position and eligible for election to the National Assembly. Additionally Article 16 of the Public Official Election Act requires the candidate to have resided in South Korea for 5 years.

== Taiwan ==
Article 45 of the Constitution of the Republic of China stipulates that any citizen of the Republic of China who has attained the age of 40 years may be elected President or Vice President.

Article 20 of the Presidential and Vice Presidential Election and Recall Act states that an elector who has lived in the free area of the Republic of China for not less than 6 consecutive months, has set his or her domicile in the Republic of China for not less than 15 years, and has completed his or her fortieth year of age may apply for being registered as the candidate for President or Vice President. Anyone who restores the nationality of the Republic of China or acquires the nationality of the Republic of China by naturalization or the People in Mainland China or the residents in Hong Kong and Macao who are permitted to enter Taiwan may not be registered as the candidate for President or Vice President.

== Turkey ==
Article 101 of the Constitution of Turkey specifies that the President of Turkey shall have completed higher education, be at least forty years of age, and be a member of the Turkish Grand National Assembly or a Turkish citizen eligible to be a deputy. The requirements for the latter are given by Article 76, and exclude, among others, persons who have failed to perform compulsory military service, and those who have been convicted for dishonourable offences. Judges, civil servants, and members of the Armed Forces are not eligible unless they resign from office.

== United States ==
The person must be a natural-born citizen of the United States and must have been a permanent resident of the United States of America for at least 14 years. A candidate must be at least 35 years of age.

No person can be elected as president of the United States more than twice, and a person who has served as president for more than two years of a term to which another person was elected president (i.e. due to the elected president's death, resignation, or removal by impeachment) cannot be elected president more than once in that person's own right.
