= President of the Council of Ministers =

Most senior member of the cabinet in the executive branch of some countries' governments

The president of the Council of Ministers (sometimes titled chairman of the Council of Ministers) is the most senior member of the cabinet in the executive branch of government in some countries. Some presidents of the Council of Ministers are the heads of government, and thus are informally referred to as a prime minister or premier.

== Countries currently using the title ==
- Chairman of the Council of Ministers of Bosnia and Herzegovina
- President of the Council of Ministers of Italy
- President of the Council of Ministers of Peru
- President of the Council of Ministers of Poland
- President of the Council of Ministers of Togo

== In supranational organisation ==
- Chairman of the Council of Ministers of the Union State of Russia and Belarus

== Countries that previously used the title ==
- President of the Council of Ministers (Empire of Brazil) (1847–1889)
- President of the Council of Ministers (United States of Brazil) (1961–1963)
- Chairmen of the Council of Ministers (Bulgaria) (1879–1991)
- President of the Council of Ministers of Cambodia (1947–1970)
- (East Germany) Chairman of the Council of Ministers of the German Democratic Republic (1949–1990)
- (Kingdom of France) President of the Council of Ministers (France) (Bourbon Restoration, July Monarchy, 2nd, 3rd and 4th Republic)
- (Hungary) Chairman of the Council of Ministers of the Hungarian People's Republic (1949–1989)
- Chairman of the Council of Ministers (Netherlands) (1848-1945) (Note: The title of Prime Minister has been used more after 1945.)
- President of the Council of Ministers (Kingdom of Portugal) (1834–1910)
- (Portugal) President of the Council of Ministers (Portuguese Republic) (1932–1974)
- President of the Council of Ministers (Romania) (1862-1989)
- President of the Council of Ministers (Spain) (1834–1939)
- Chairman of the Council of Ministers of the Soviet Union (1922–1991)
- Chairman of the Council of Ministers (Vietnam) (1980–1992)
- President of the Council of Ministers (Kingdom of Yugoslavia) (1918–1941)
- President of the Council of Ministers of Cuba (1976–2019)

== See also ==
- Council of Ministers
