= Trams in Europe =

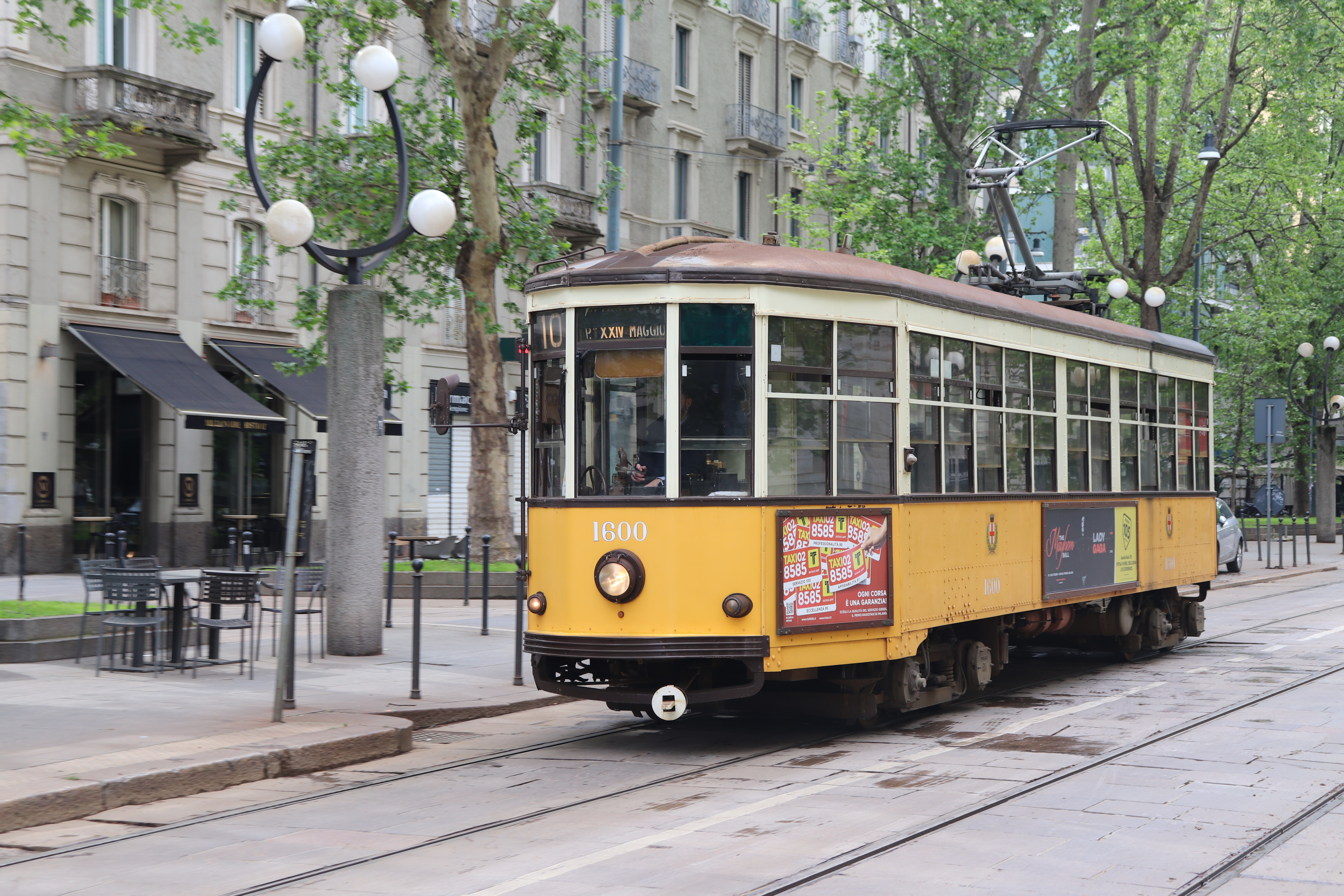
Peter Witt tram in Milan: this type is also used in San Francisco.

Tram number 572 of Lisbon, Portugal.

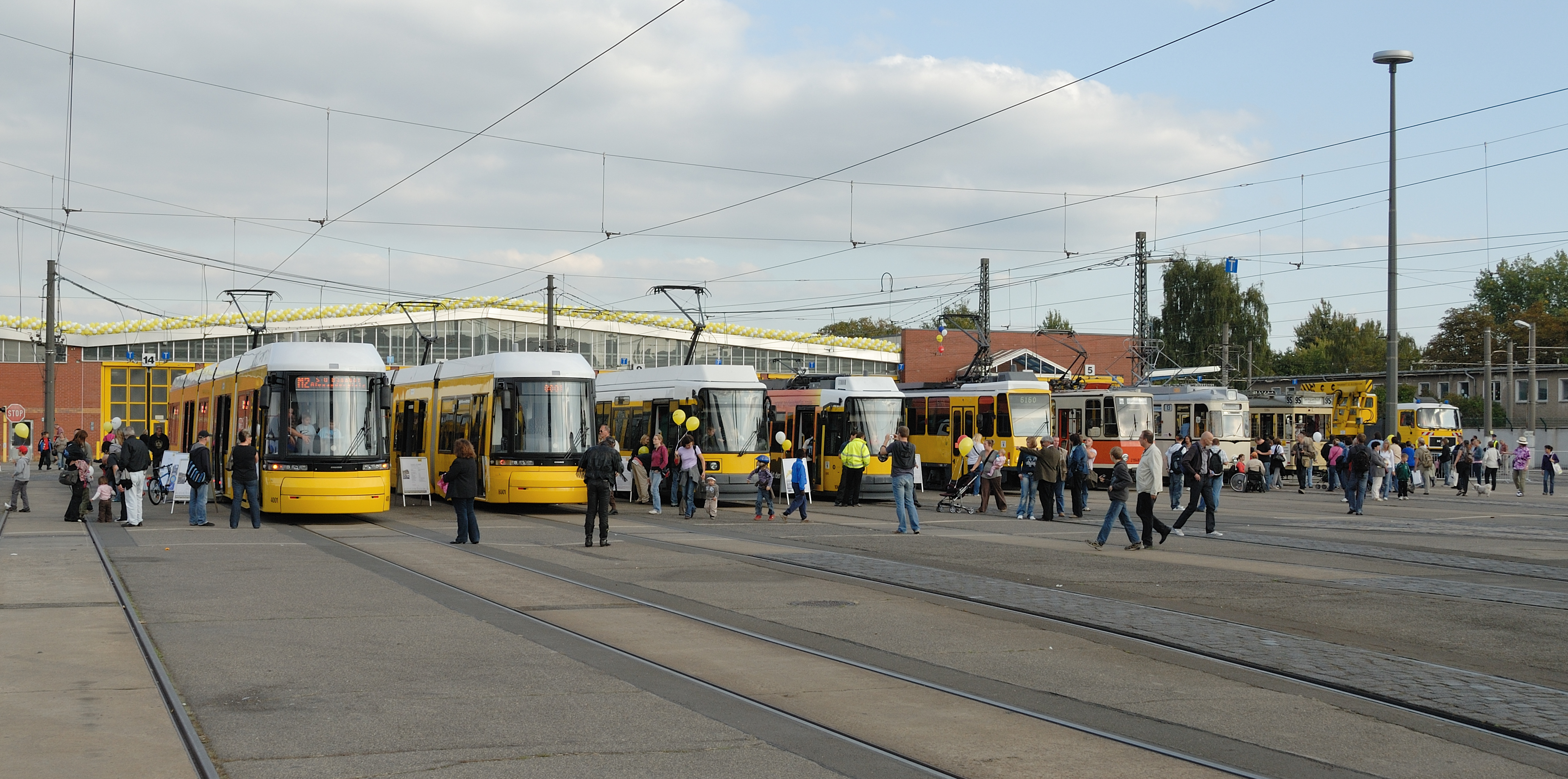
Five generations of trams in Berlin, Germany.

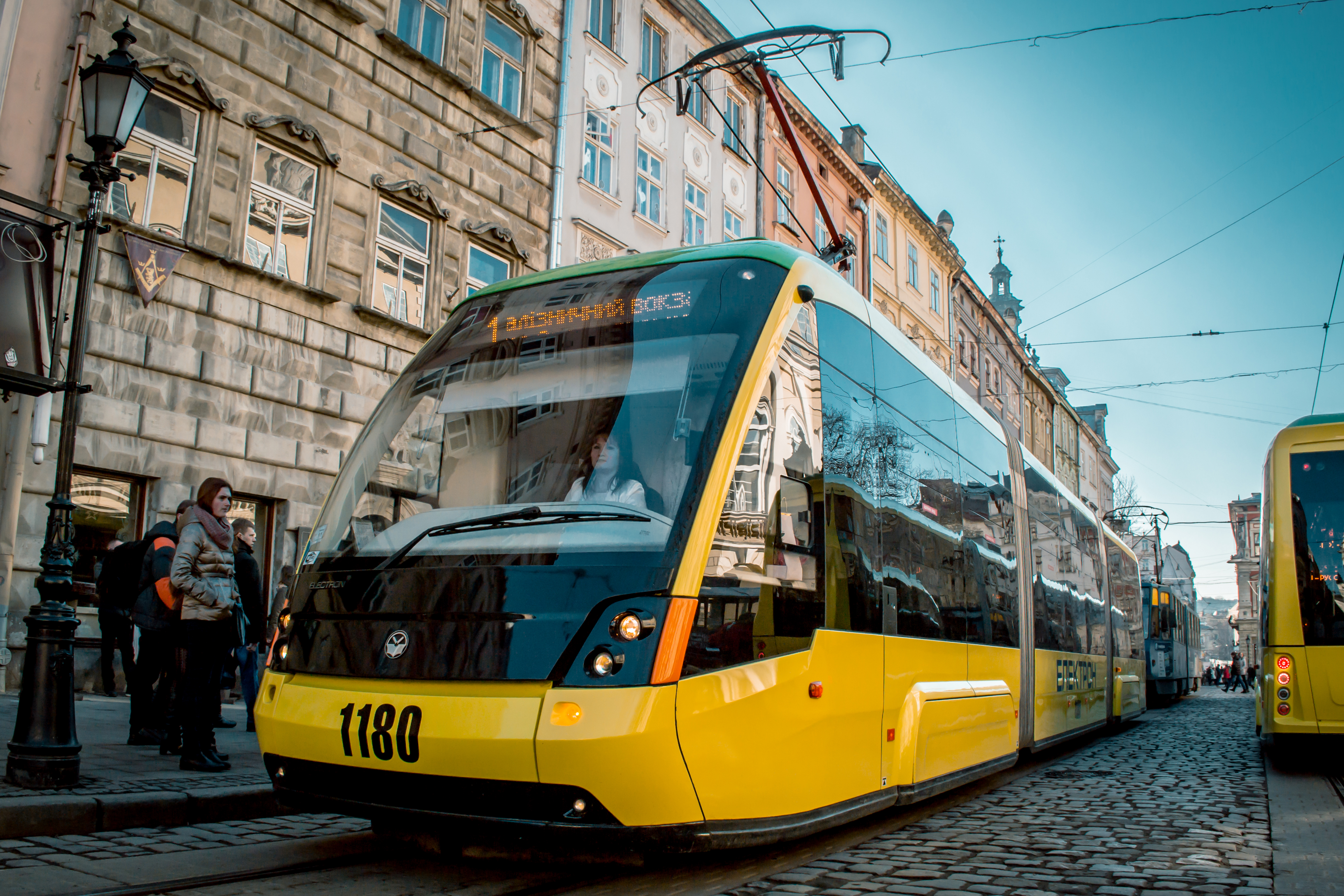
Electron T3L44 in Lviv, Ukraine

Europe has an extensive number of tramway networks. Some of these networks have been upgraded to light rail standards, called Stadtbahn in Germany, premetros in Belgium, sneltram in the Netherlands, metro ligeiro in Portugal and fast trams in some other countries.

== Overview ==
The introduction of trams in all the major cities of the late 19th century forced users and non-users alike to adjust to this new form of transportation. Many early trams were horse-drawn, but electric trams followed. By the mid-1910s, the urban population were fully accustomed to trams as a mode of transport for work and leisure, and as a very positive and visual sign of the prosperity and prestige of the city. Visitors from the farms, villages and small towns sometimes made a trip on the tram a high priority when they came to the big city. A number of cities have retained - but also expanded - their original 19th century tram network, notably The Hague (1864), Berlin and Vienna (1865), Warsaw (1866), Brussels (1868), Lisbon (1872), Prague (1875), Gothenburg (1879), Budapest (1887), Helsinki (1891), Kyiv (1892), Milan (1893), Rome, Bucharest and Belgrade (1894), Porto and Gdańsk (1895).

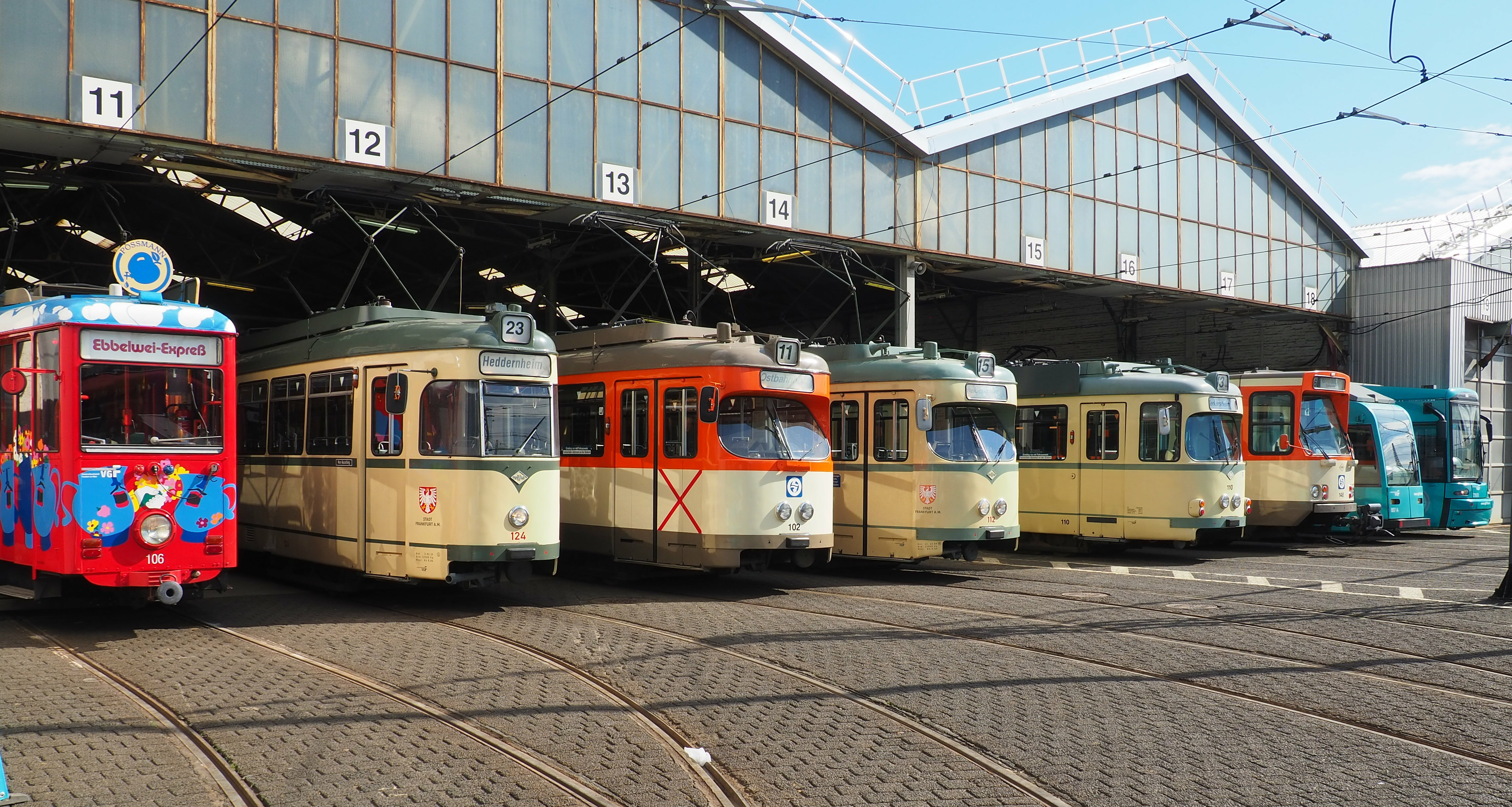
Historic trams in Frankfurt am Main, Germany

After World War 2, trams were seen as advantageous in many countries because, unlike buses, they did not use scarce petrol resources. Still many tramways closed in the mid 20th century, as they were seen as less effective in terms of costs and use of the roadway than other forms of street transport. However, in recent decades tram networks in many countries in Europe have grown considerably. In 2018, Europe had 204 networks, more than half of the total amount in the world.

The Netherlands, which already makes extensive use of trams, has plans to expand tram services to two additional cities.

In Germany, many cities retain their original tram networks. In some places, tram networks have been added or expanded through the introduction of hybrid tram-train or stadtbahn systems which may combine standard railway, on-street and underground operations. Notable examples are the systems in Cologne and Karlsruhe. In Frankfurt-am-Main, many tram lines were transferred to U-Bahn operation.

In the United Kingdom, investment in public transport in the late 1980s turned to light rail as an alternative to more costly underground railway solutions, with the opening of the Tyne & Wear Metro in Newcastle (1980) and the Docklands Light Railway in London (1987) systems. However, the first British city to reintroduce on-street trams was Manchester, with the opening of its Metrolink network in 1992. Several other UK cities followed with their own modern tram systems, including Sheffield (Supertram, opened 1994), Birmingham and Wolverhampton (West Midlands Metro, opened 1999), London (Tramlink, opened 2000, albeit in a small part of Greater London), Nottingham (Nottingham Express Transit, opened 2004) and Edinburgh (Edinburgh Trams, opened 2014). Cardiff is currently building a system of 4 Light Rail Lines due to open in 2024. Many of these cities are planning or building network extensions.

Paris reintroduced trams with line T1 in 1992, and many French cities have seen a similar revival, for example the Tramway de Grenoble and the Montpellier trams.

The Czech capital Prague had planned one new line and the extension of eight others between 2007 and 2016, with an official of the Prague Public Transport Company stating that "In Europe in the past 10 years, tram transportation is the preferred way of transit; we can say that tram transportation is going through its renaissance period".

In Luxembourg City, Luxembourg, trams were reintroduced in December 2017, after being replaced by buses in 1964.

All the former communist countries of Central and Eastern Europe, excluding Albania, Lithuania, North Macedonia, Montenegro, Moldova and Slovenia, have extensive tram infrastructure. Industrial freight use of city tram lines was a widespread practice until the 1960s, but has since mostly disappeared. Another factor is an increasing replacement of trams with trolleybuses as cities face a rapid increase in traffic, and such replacement often allows more of the roadway to be used by cars. One of the exceptions is Warsaw, Poland, where the last trolleybus line was closed in the year 1995 due to high maintenance costs, and replaced with buses. Czech ČKD Tatra and the Hungarian Ganz factories were notable manufacturers of trams.

=== Austria ===
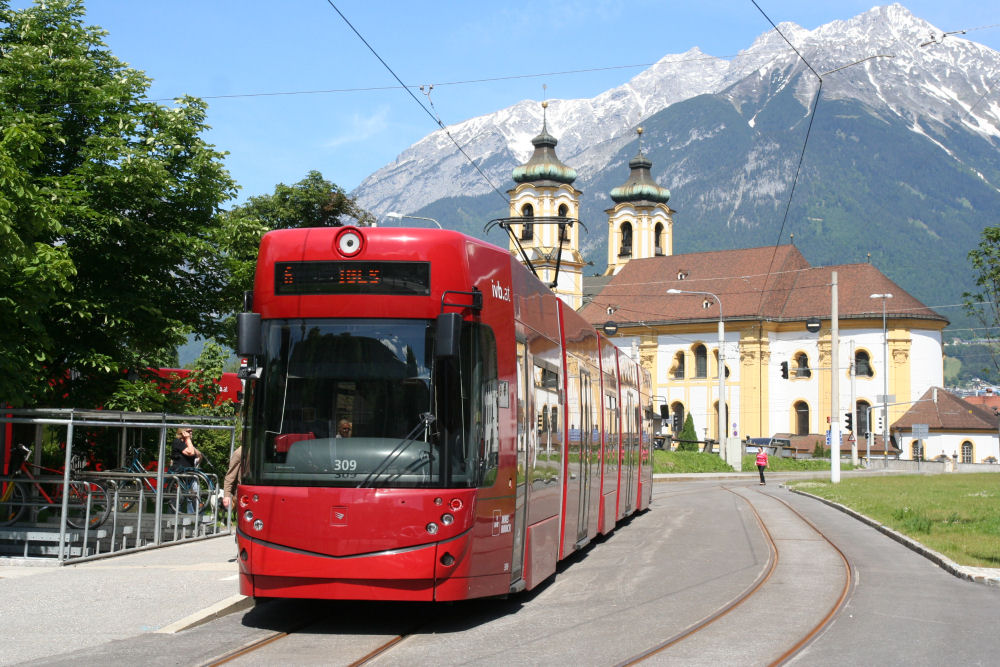
A tram in Innsbruck

In Austria, Gmunden, Graz, Innsbruck, Linz and Vienna all have tramway systems. With 173.4 km of track, Vienna's network is one of the largest in the world. The cars have been constantly modernised over the years and many are now ultra low-floored. Many of the Austrian tramlines have been in constant operation since they were first opened. Vienna started with horse trams in 1865 and electrification followed in 1897. Graz had horse trams in 1878 and electric cars in 1898 while Linz goes back to 1880 with electrification in 1897. The Gmunden Tramway, only 2.3 km long, is currently one of the shortest in the world, and with gradients of up to 9.6%, it is also one of the steepest and has become a popular tourist attraction. Innsbruck, which traditionally used second-hand trams from other cities, replaced its whole fleet with 32 Bombardier low-floor cars in Summer 2009. The Pöstlingbergbahn, in Linz, an unusual "mountain tramway", has a gradient of 10.6%, which makes it one of the world's steepest gradients on a surviving adhesion-only railway. The tramway now reaches the city centre via the tracks of the urban tram system.

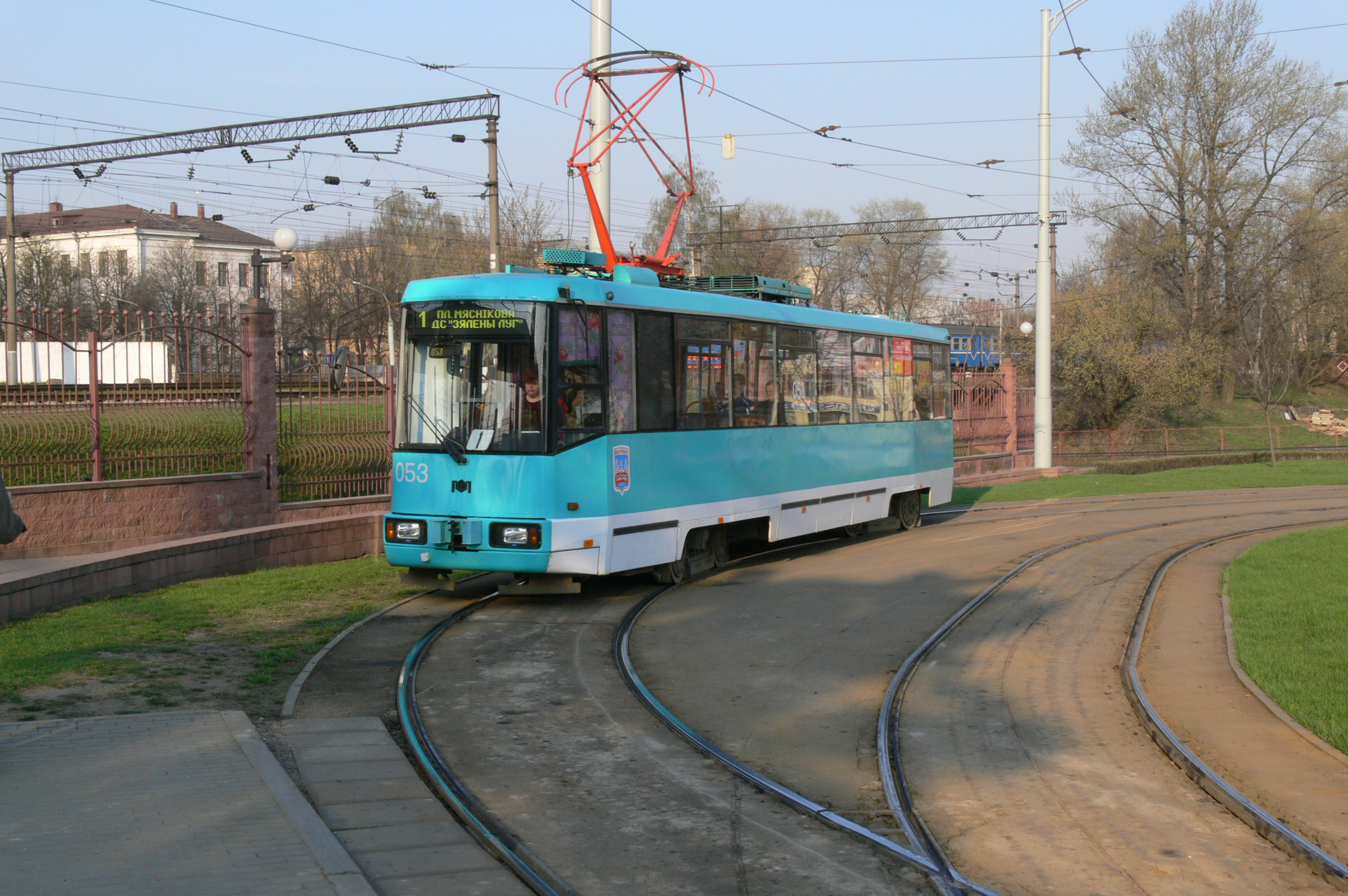
A Minsk tram

=== Belarus ===
There are four tram systems in Belarus currently: Minsk, Mazyr, Novopolotsk and Vitebsk. All networks have a gauge of 1524 mm. The first line in Minsk opened in 1892, the newest system is that of Mazyr, which opened in 1988. Belarus has its own tramcar-manufacturer: Belkommunmash, which produces low-floor trams as well.

=== Belgium ===
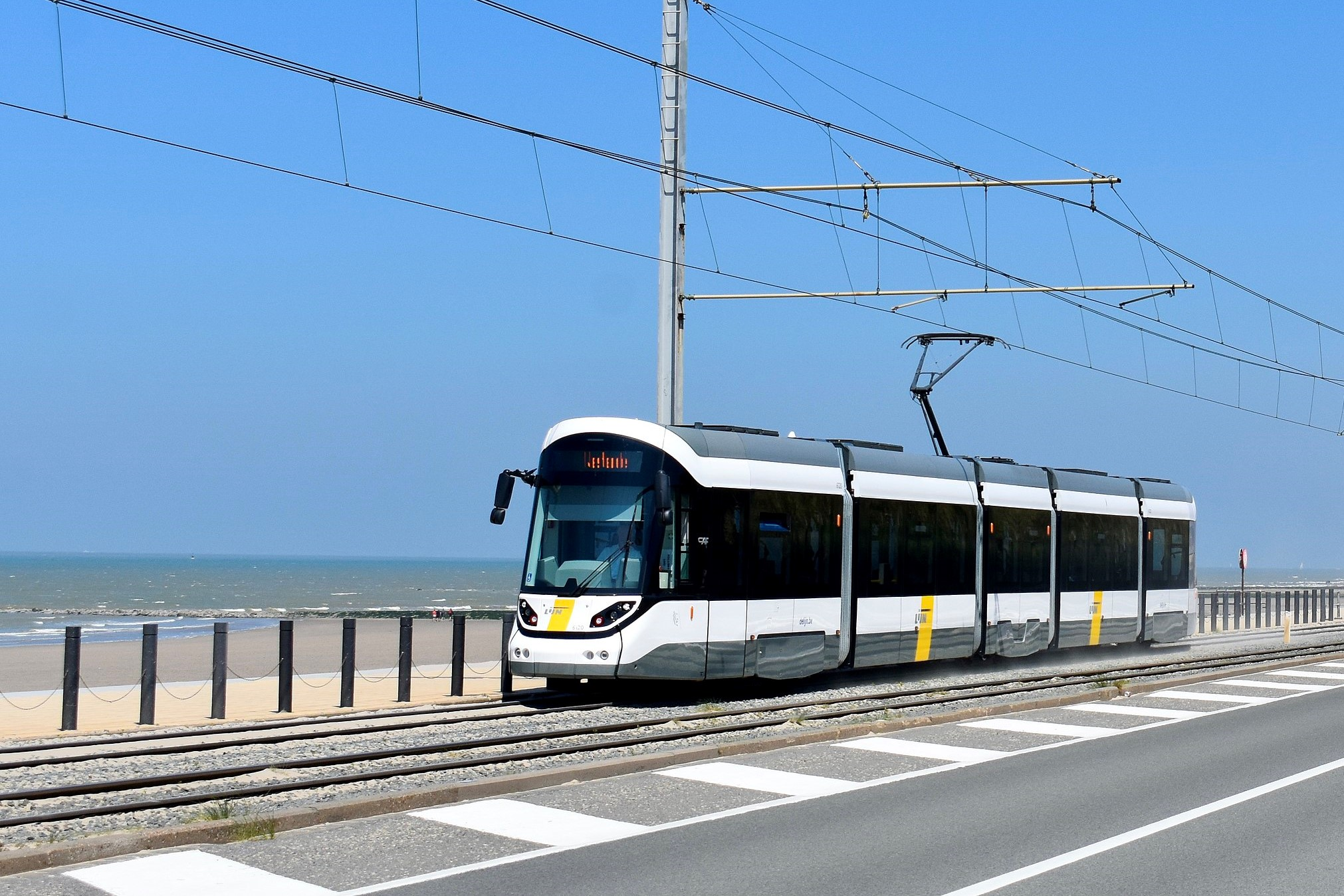
The Belgian Coast Tram.

In Belgium an extensive prewar system of tram-like local railways called Vicinal or Buurtspoorweg lines used to exist, which had a greater total route kilometre length than the main-line railway system. The only survivors of the Vicinal system are the Kusttram, the longest tram line in the world, which almost reaches France at one end of the line and the Netherlands at the other, and two sections that form part of the Métro Léger de Charleroi.

Urban tram networks exist in Antwerp, Ghent and Brussels, and are gradually being extended. In Liège after closure of its first network in 1967, the second network opened in 2025.

=== Bosnia and Herzegovina ===
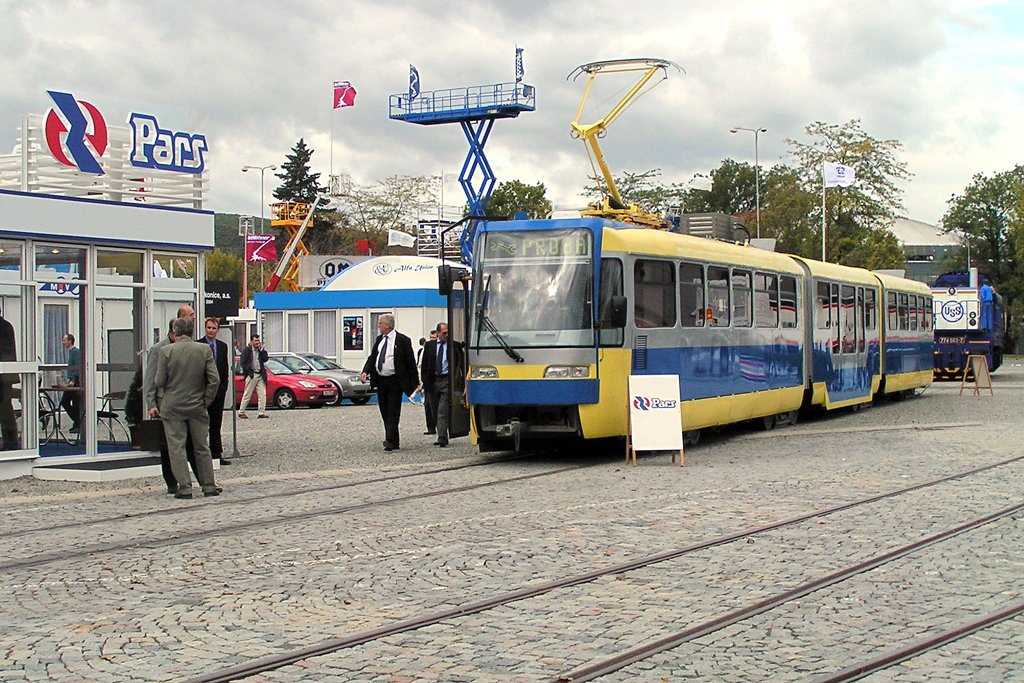
A Sarajevo tram

The electric tram started in Sarajevo in 1895.

Several trams were badly damaged during the Bosnian war. Several European countries donated out of use trams to Sarajevo in the years after the war.

Since 2024, more modern Stadler Tango trams have arrived to upgrade and expand the fleet.

=== Bulgaria ===
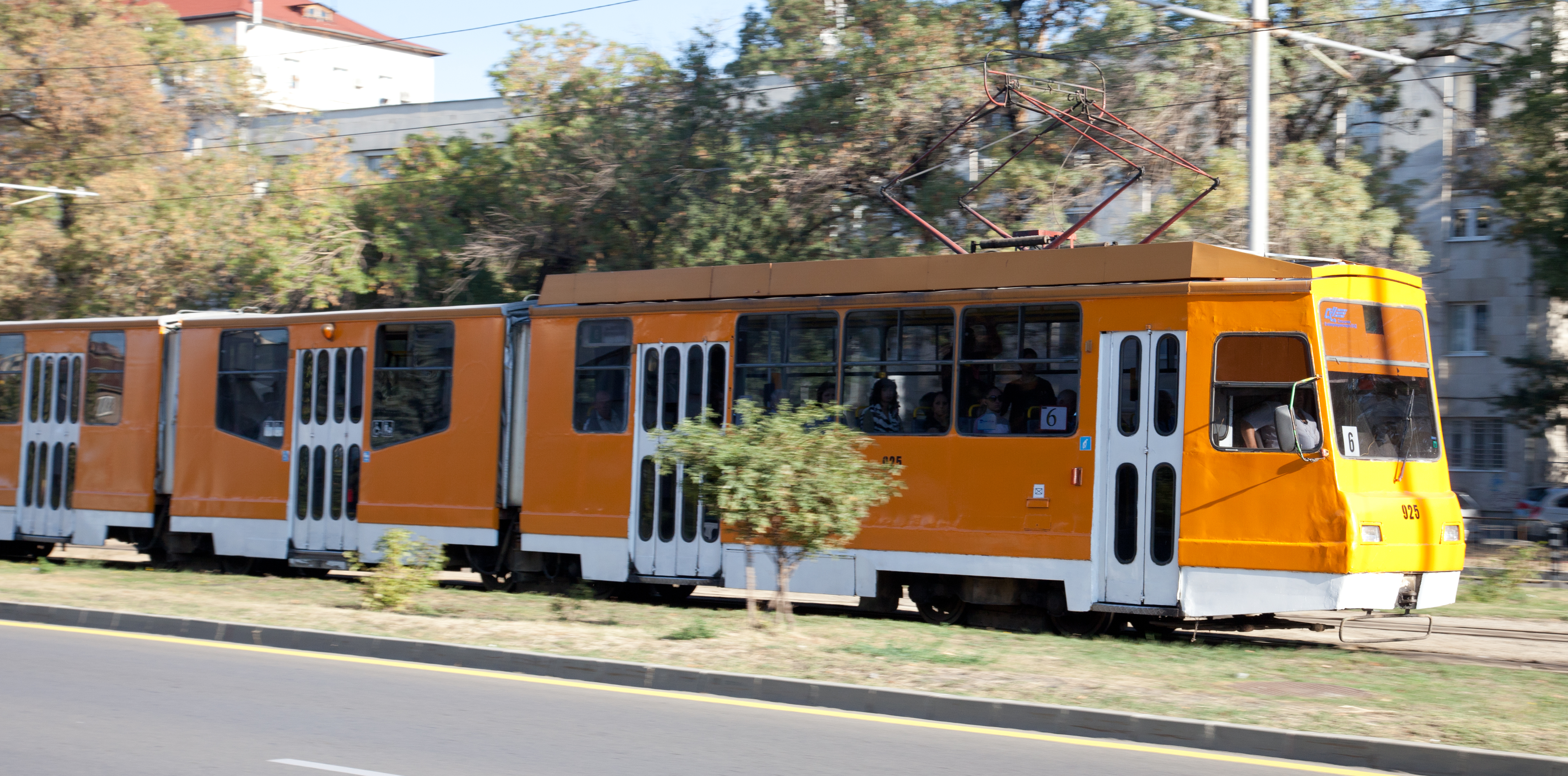
The T6M-700m trams are 30% low-floor.

Sofia is the only city that currently has a tram system. It had its first horse-drawn tram in operation in 1898. On 1 January 1901 the electric tram system was inaugurated and had 25 cars and 10 carriages and the total length of the lines was 25 km. Currently Sofia's extensive tram network consists of 15 routes, 3 of which are operated on the standard gauge of 1435mm, while the others use a narrow gauge of 1009mm. Due to the construction of the Sofia Metro there were some closures and retracing, but the system continues to be one of the largest in Europe. According to the official website, as of 2006 there are 308 km of track, with 190 trams in service on any given weekday.

=== Croatia ===
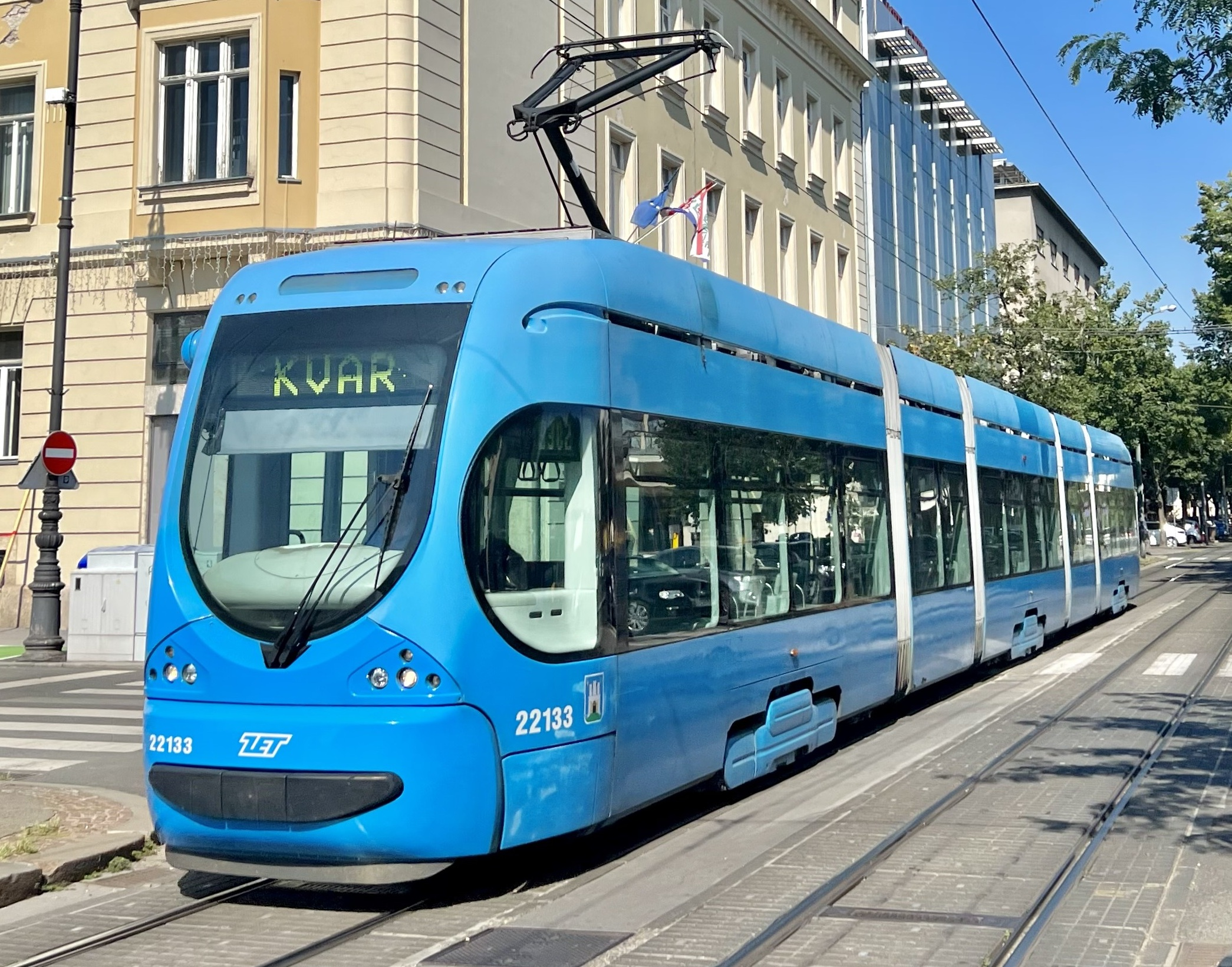
Crotram low-floor trams in Zagreb, Croatia.

Zagreb has had a tram service since 5 September 1891; it is now an extensive tram network with 15 day lines and 4 night lines covering over 116 km (72 mi) of tracks through 255 stations. ZET, the major transit authority in Zagreb, ordered 210 new, 100% low-floor trams from Croatian consortium Crotram. As of 2010, all of these locally produced, low-floor Crotram trams have been delivered, with a mixture of vehicle types in operation, including Czech Tatra Cars and various locally produced trams. Zagreb is one of the few tram networks in the world where most of the operations run at the curb.

The only other Croatian city with trams still in operation is Osijek. The first tram route commenced in 1884 (connecting the railway station and city square) and trams have been running since. Between 2006 and 2007, the trams were refurbished and modernised. Two lines presently exist, with another two extensions planned, doubling the network length.

Dubrovnik, Opatija, Pula, Rijeka and Velika Gorica previously also operated trams.

=== Czech Republic ===
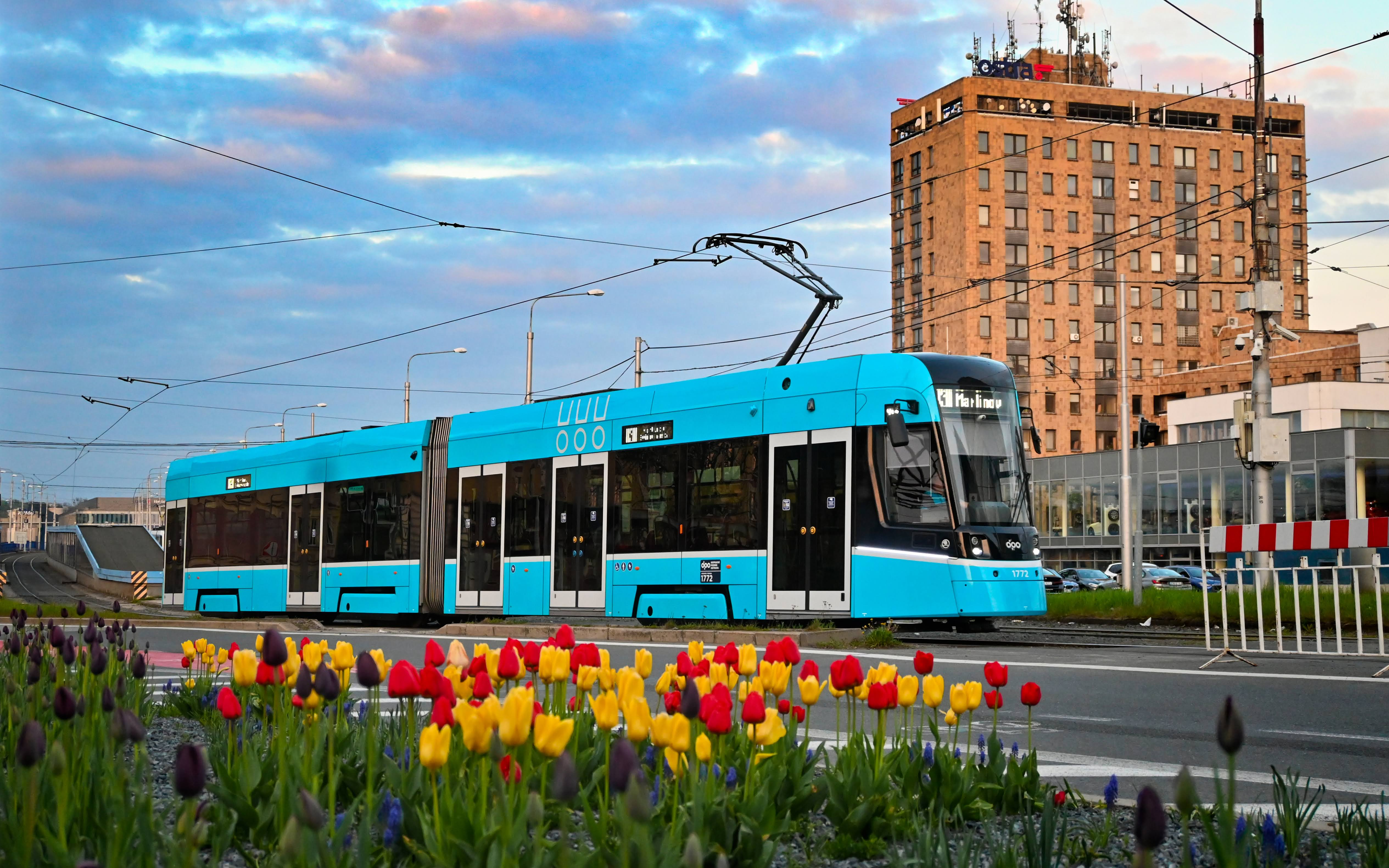
Skoda 39T in Ostrava

The Czech Republic is well known for its extensive tram infrastructure, with trams often being present even in small cities. The largest network is in Prague, with 150.3 kilometres of track and 26 day lines, 9 night lines and 2 historical lines. Other cities with tram systems are Brno, Ostrava, Plzeň, Olomouc, Most and Litvínov (common network), Liberec (including intercity line to Jablonec). Tram networks in nine other cities were closed down mainly during the 1960s and replaced with trolleybuses or buses.

Before changes in 1989, ČKD Tatra in Prague was the largest tram producer in the world, mainly exporting its trams to Soviet Bloc countries. Production was definitely stopped in 2001, after ČKD was sold to Siemens AG. The tradition of tram production is continuing with Škoda Transportation, Inekon and TW TEAM/PRAGOIMEX.

=== Denmark ===
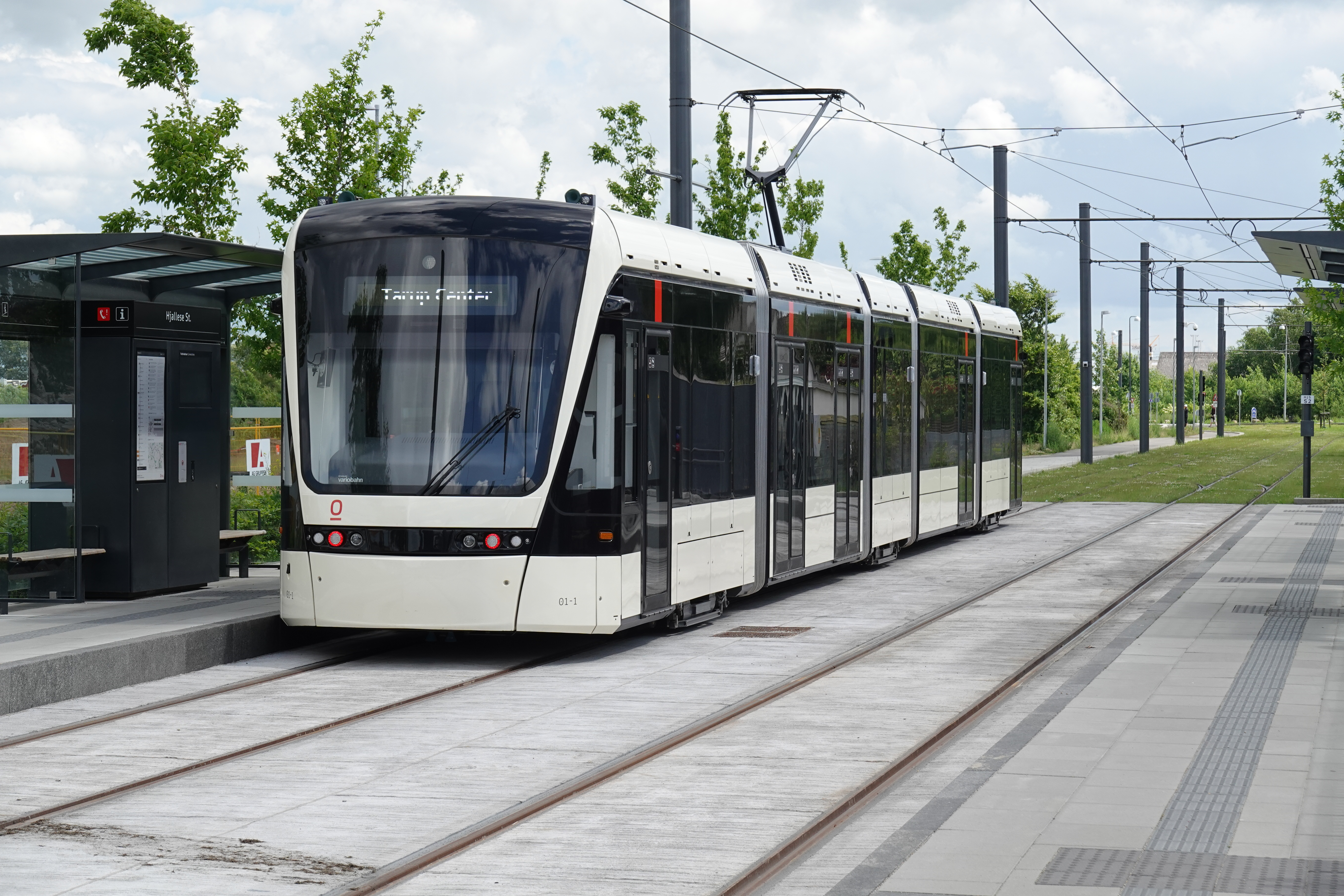
An Odense Letbane urban tram

In Aarhus, Denmark the Aarhus Letbane a new tramway is combined with converted local railways, operating since December 2017.

In Odense, Denmark the Odense Letbane a new tramway, operating since 28 May 2022. It has special vehicles that can also run on tram-train sections.

In Copenhagen, Denmark construction was started on a new tramway, Greater Copenhagen Light Rail The first section opened in late 2025.

=== Estonia ===
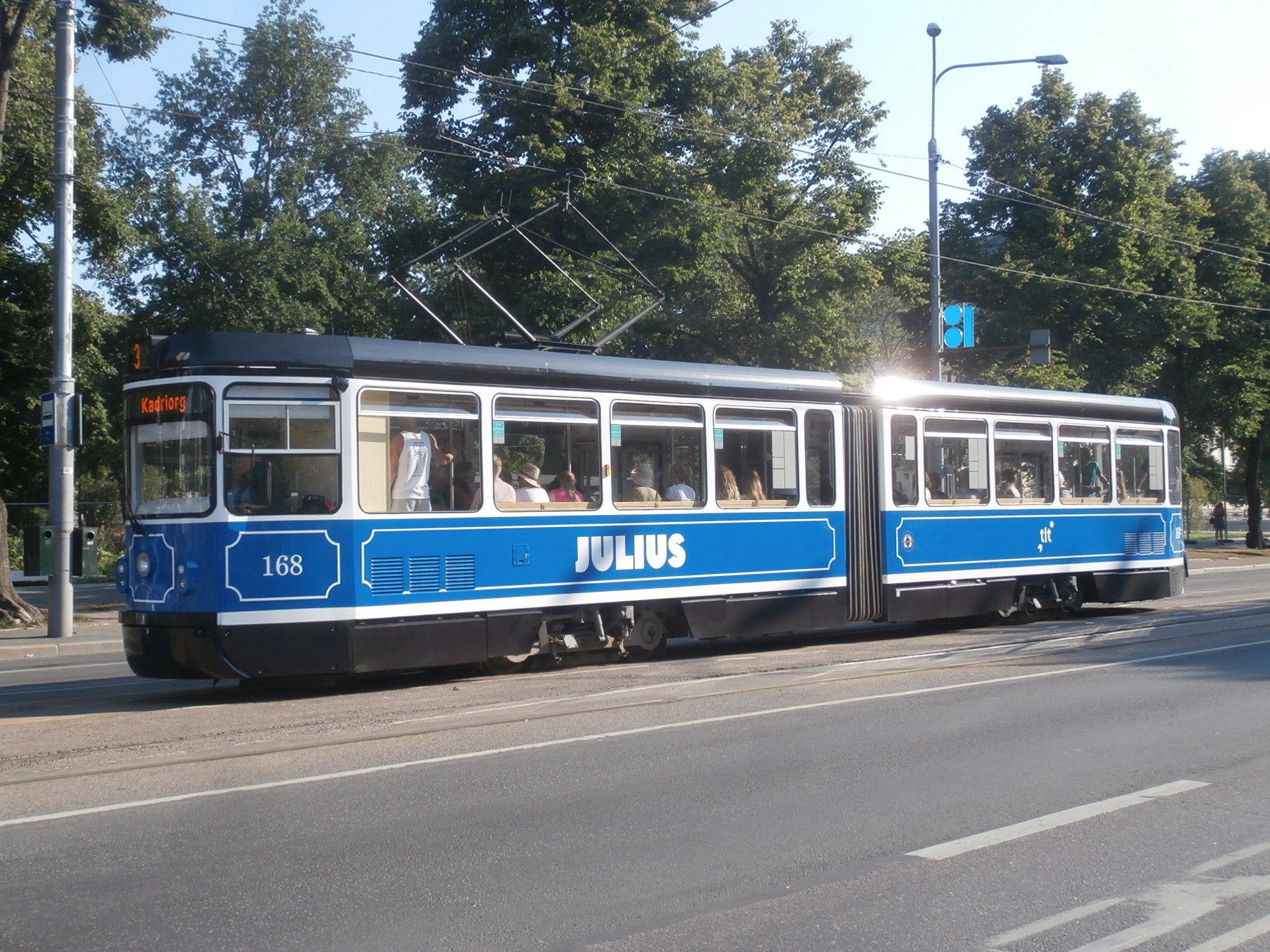
Tatra KT4 tram in Tallinn

In Estonia, trams are used only in the capital, Tallinn. There has been a growing tram network in Tallinn since 1888, when traffic was started by horse-powered trams. The first line was electrified on 28 October 1925. Estonian-built electric trams were also used, with some gas-powered trams having been used in the 1920s and 1930s. The last part of the system to be electrified was the spur to Kopli in 1951, which was also converted to double track at the time, and was connected to the rest of the network in 1953.

From 1955 to 1988, German-built trams were used. The first Czechoslovak-built tram arrived in 1973. In 2007, 56 Tatra KT4SUs, 12 KTNF6s (rebuilt KT4SUs) and 23 second-hand KT4Ds trams were in use. There are four lines, with total length of tramlines 39 km. Plans have been in the works since the late 1970s to open a light rail line from one of the suburbs, Lasnamäe, to the city centre.

In 2017, an extension was opened to Tallinn Airport. This is the first extension to the network since 1955, when the stretch to Ülemiste district was lengthened.

The track and electrical systems have also undergone major work to enable the system to accommodate 20 new low-floor trams delivered by CAF in 2016.

=== Finland ===
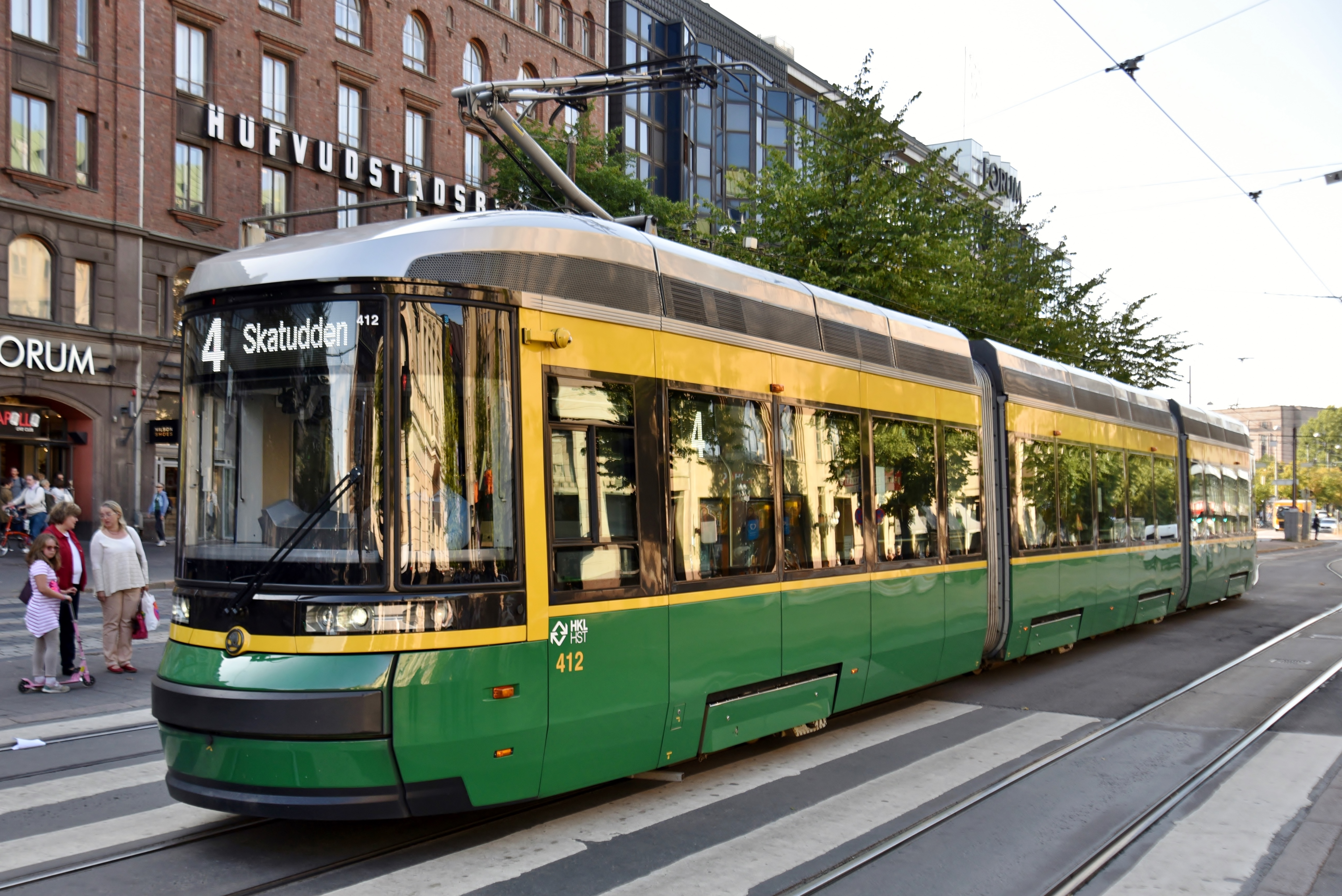
Skoda Artic tram in Helsinki

In Finland, there have been four cities with trams: Helsinki, Turku, Viipuri and Tampere. Of the three older systems only Helsinki has retained its tram network. The system has operated continuously since 1891 and it was fully electrified by 1901. Currently there are 10 tram lines on 89.5 kilometres of track. Around 200,000 passengers use the tram network each weekday and within the inner city of Helsinki trams have established a position as the main form of public transport. The network is being actively developed, with a new line opened in 2008 and more lines planned to connect new residential areas to be built in 2009–2015. In 2009, the city invited bids for manufacturers to produce 40 new low-floor trams, with an option for further 50 available.

The City of Tampere begun construction of a tram network in early 2017, with phase 1 from the city centre to Hervanta, and the University Hospital. The first phase of the tram system was opened in 2021. Construction of phase 2, from the city centre to Lentävänniemi in the west, begun in 2021 and was completed in the beginning of 2025.

The cities of Oulu and Turku have started the planning of tram networks. Turku has accepted The Light Rail Network of Turku's principal plan as obeyed normatively. Even though Oulu's vice mayor rejected the idea, the city included it in The Zoning Scheme of New Oulu as "normative" and "necessary".

=== France ===
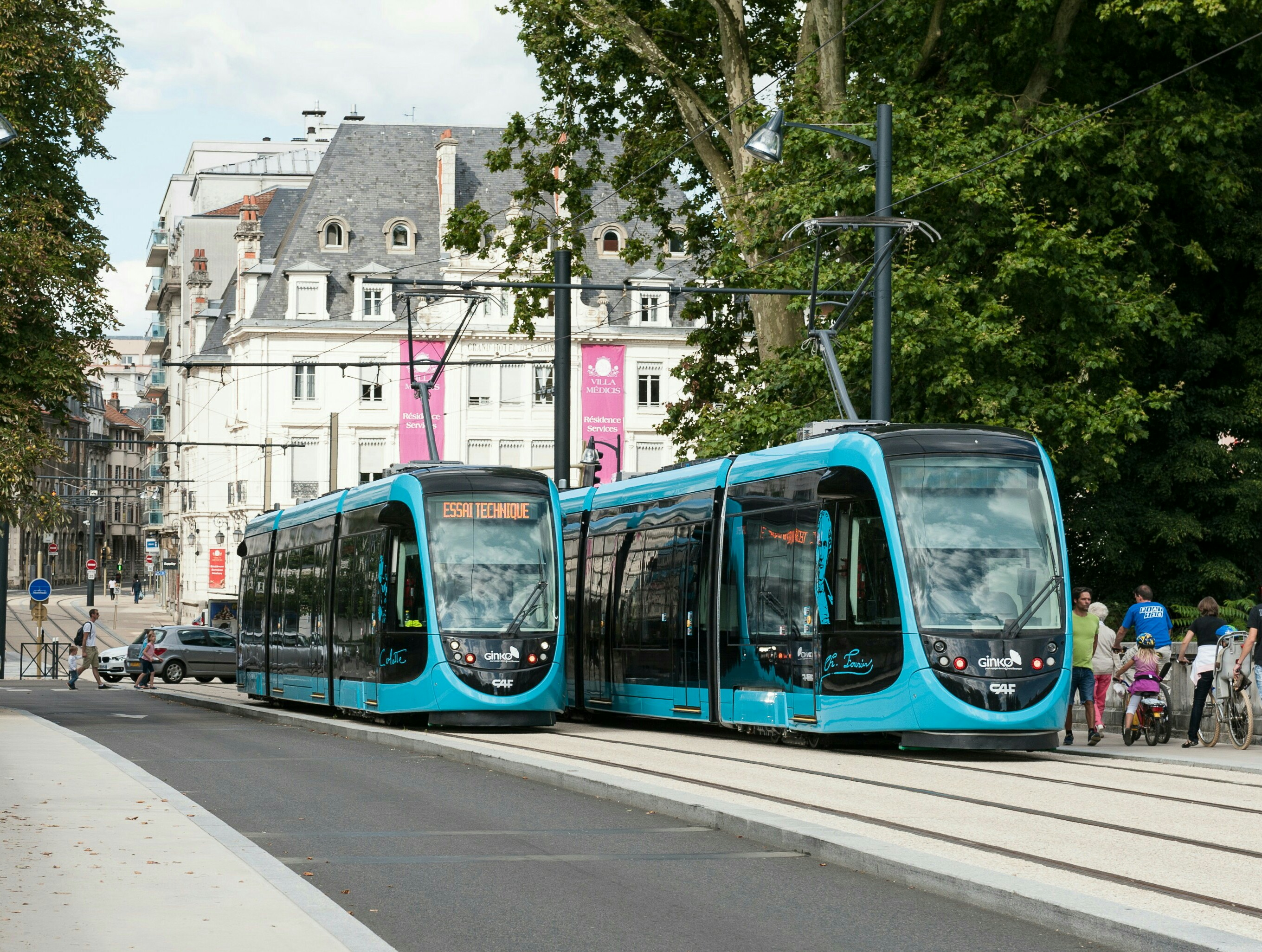
Trams in Besançon, France.

After the closure of most of France's tram systems in previous decades, by 1971 only the network in Saint-Étienne, Marseille and Lille. A rapidly growing number of France's major cities boast new tram networks, including Paris (the largest French network), Lyon, Marseille, Nantes, Strasbourg, Grenoble, Montpellier, and Besançon. Since the 1990s, tram systems have been introduced, or expanded, in twenty-eight towns and cities. Many experiments, such as ground level power supply in Bordeaux, avoiding the need for overhead line equipment, or trolleybus-tram-BRT hybrids in Nancy and Caen with Bombardier Guided Light Transit. Smaller cities like Avignon are now running tram lines too.

=== Germany ===
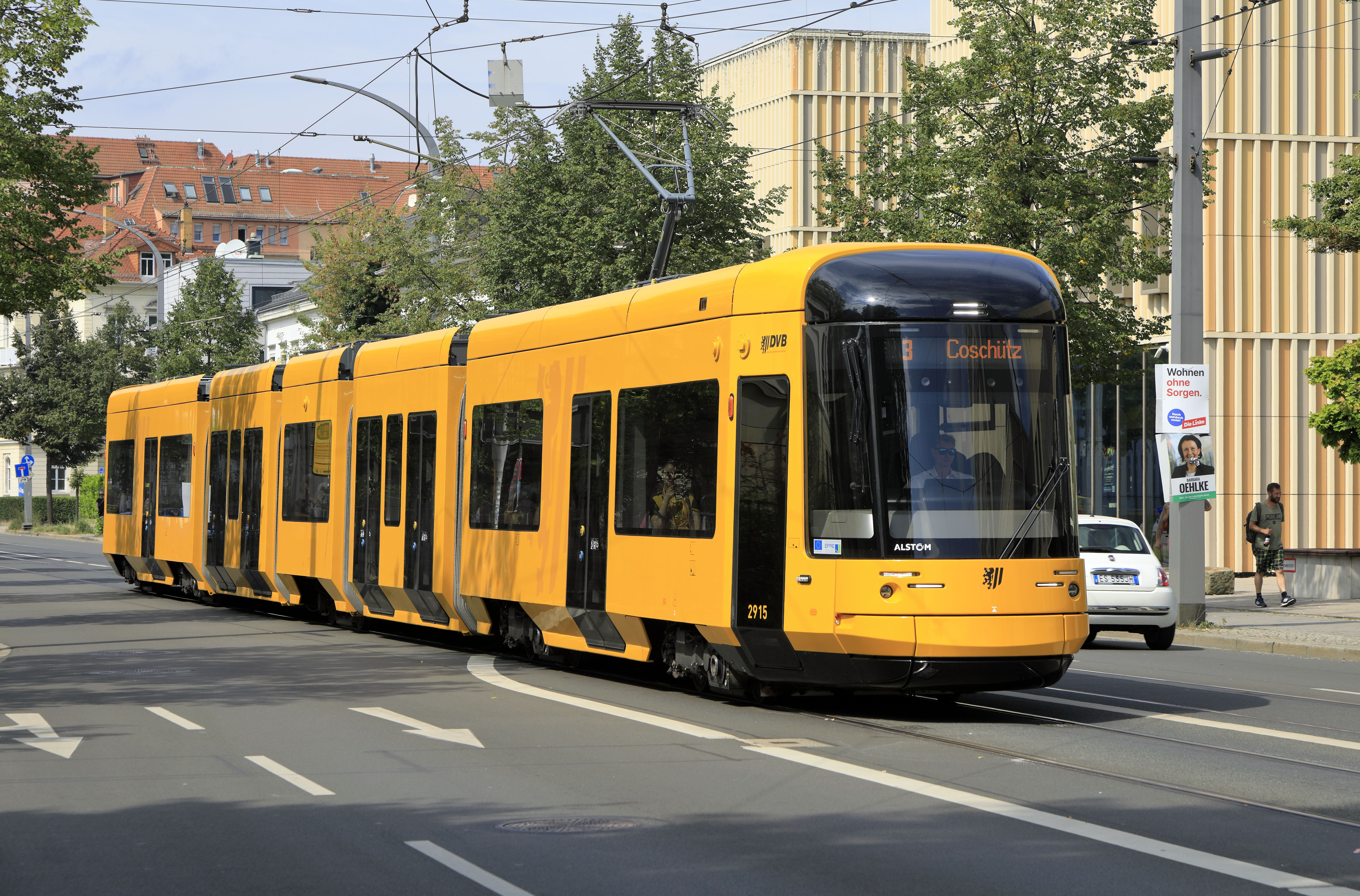
Bombardier Flexity trams in Dresden, Germany.

Tramways in Germany served as the primary means of urban transport until the early 1960s when they were systematically replaced by buses. Tramways begun to reappear in the 1980s, before once again becoming a modern means of public transport in the 1990s. Popular notions of fashion have been used by scholars to explain this cycle of acceptance, rejection and restoration.

Germany (where tramways are called Straßenbahn, meaning street railway) is notable for its large numbers of extensive tram systems, although even in this country many systems were closed after the Second World War, such as the tramway in Hamburg which last ran in 1978. Following the renaissance of trams in France and positive experience with tram-train and similar concepts (e.g. the Karlsruhe model), most German tramways are expanding, including new systems in cities that had previously abandoned them or entirely new systems in cities without any tram history.

==== Light rail in Germany ====
Stadtbahn, literally city railway in German, is the term for light rail in Germany and is the predecessor of the North American light rail. Most German light rail systems were started in the 1960s and 1970s with the intention of establishing full-scale underground, or U-Bahn (short for Untergrundbahn) systems. By the 1980s virtually all cities had abandoned these plans due to the high costs of converting tramways, and the most common systems are a mixture of tramway-like operations in suburban areas, with U-Bahn style operation, featuring underground stations, in the city centre areas.

=== Greece ===
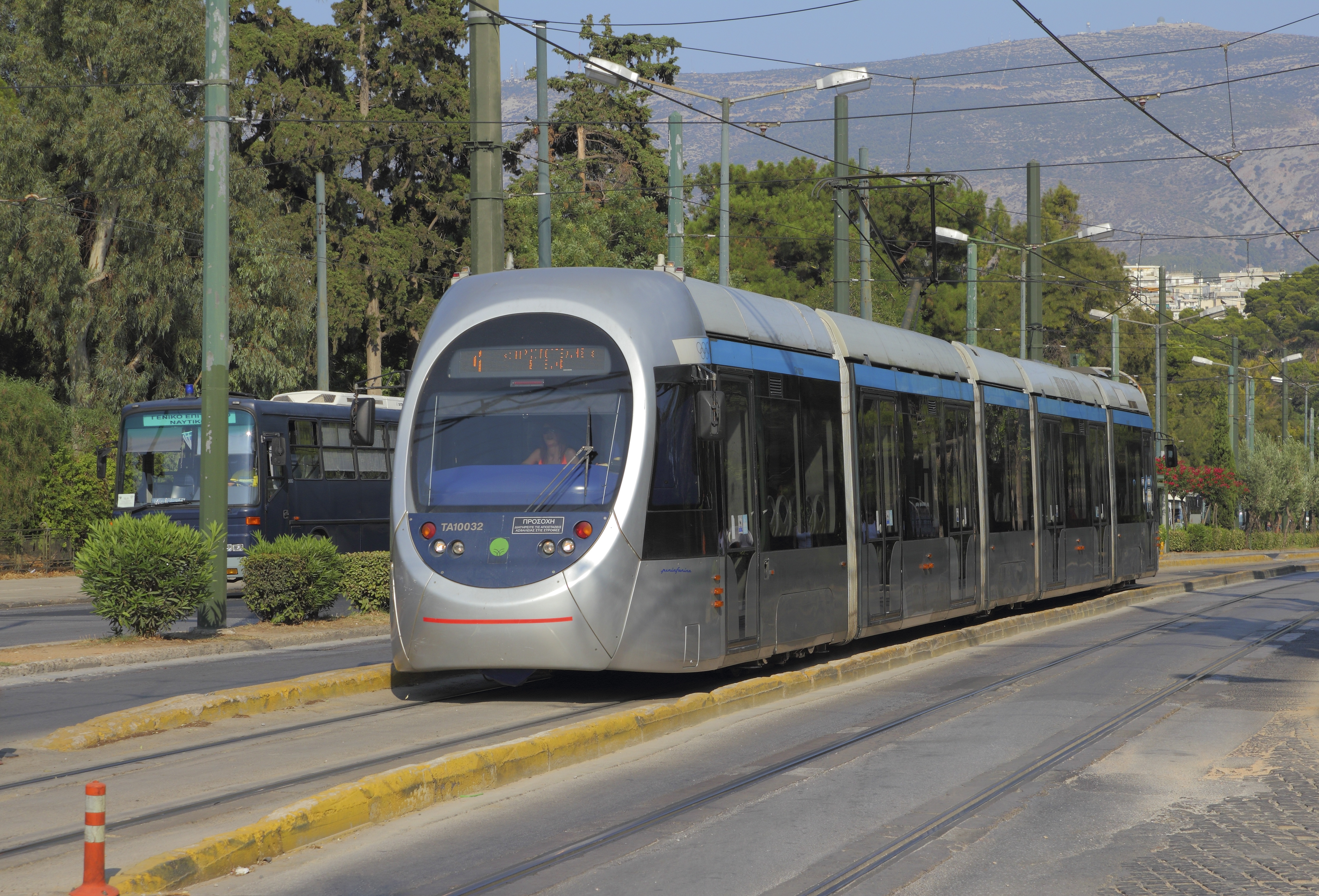
Tram in Athens, Greece.

Trams were the main mode of mass transportation in Athens, Thessaloniki, Patras, Volos, Kalamata and Piraeus before World War II but were ripped out due to the cars and busses rapidly rising popularity.

The first trams in Athens began operating in 1882. They were light vehicles drawn by three horses running on an extensive network throughout the city centre and a line reaching the suburb of Faliro. After the German occupation, the tramways began to decline, with lines gradually abandoned and replaced by trolleybuses, considered more appropriate and agile for the urban environment at that time. It is frequently mentioned somehow poetically that "The last bell of the Athens Tram rang on the midnight of October 16, 1960". The tram had been a trademark of Athens until that date, and it is still viewed nostalgically. One tram line was left in Perama, which remained in operation until April 1977. A modern tram line was installed for the 2004 Summer Olympics, with vehicles designed by the famous Ferrari designer Sergio Pininfarina. There are three routes and 24 km of tramlines, running from Syntagma Square to Eden Station, and from Peace & Friendship Stadium in Piraeus to Glyfada along the coast. Routes were extended by 0.7 km from Glyfada to Voula in 2007, and was expanded 2.5 km further from Peace & Friendship Stadium to Piraeus centre in 2021.

=== Hungary ===
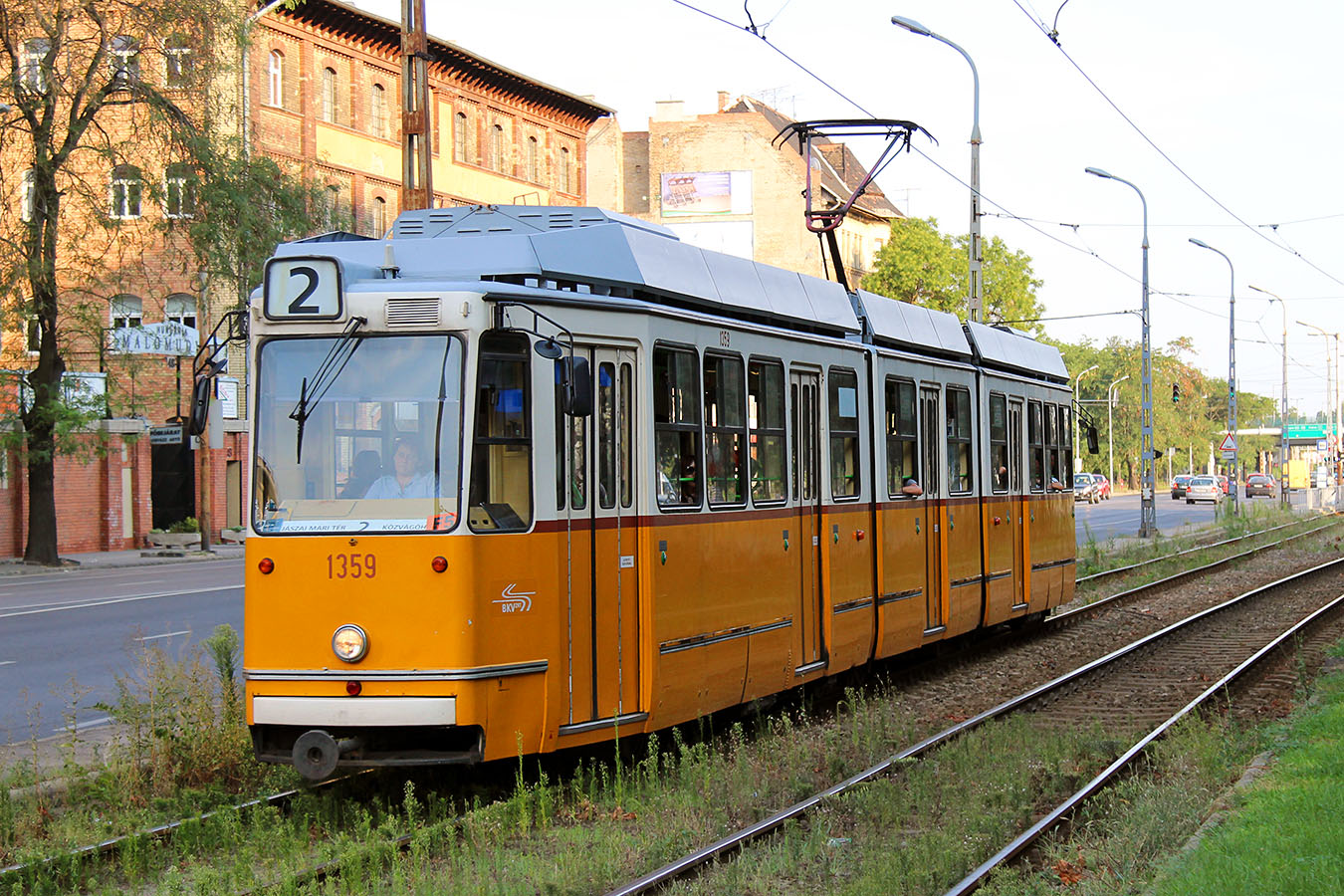
Tram in Budapest Hungary.

The Hungarian cities of Budapest, Debrecen, Hódmezővásárhely, Miskolc and Szeged currently have tramways. The Budapest network, at 149 km, is the backbone of the capital's transit system and is by far the most extensive in the country.

Historically, Hungary has had tramways in Sopron until 1923, Pécs until 1960, Nyíregyháza until 1969 and Szombathely until 1974.

=== Ireland ===
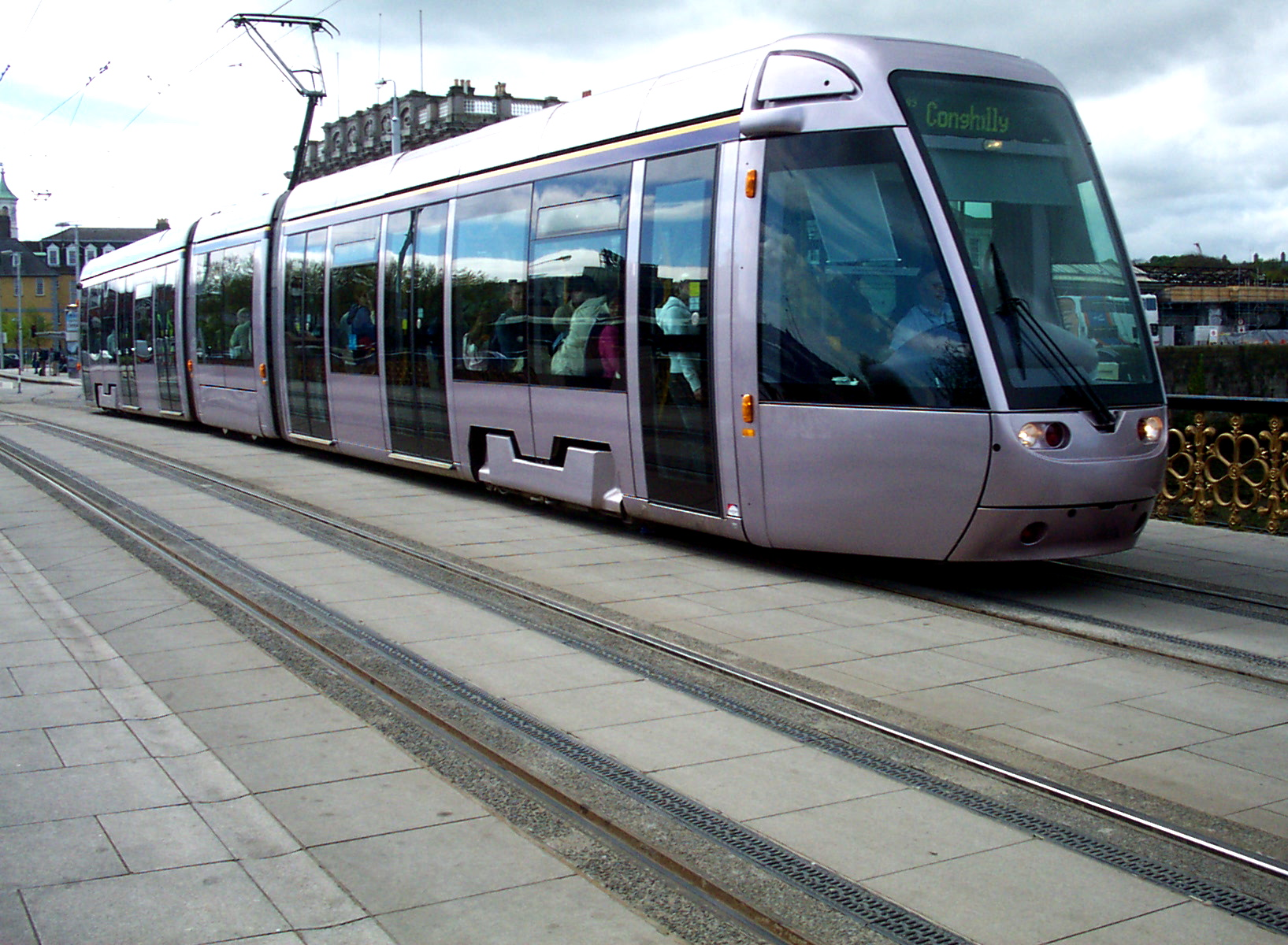
The Luas in Dublin, Ireland.

Replacing a once-extensive network of Dublin tramways which closed in 1949, in 2004 the Irish capital Dublin opened the first two lines of a new light-rail system known as Luas, Irish for "speed". It features on-street running in the city centre, but is considered a light-rail system as it runs along a dedicated right-of-way for much of its suburban route. Two light-metro lines fully segregated from traffic were planned to be built by 2014, but were cancelled due to the economic downturn.

Plans also exist for light-rail systems in the cities of Cork, which had a modest system until the early 20th century, and Galway. In January 2007, the Green Party promised that, if it formed part of the next government in 2007, it would have light rail systems built in those two cities. A smaller campaign was also ongoing for the construction of a light rail system in Limerick.

=== Italy ===
Tram in Rome, Italy.

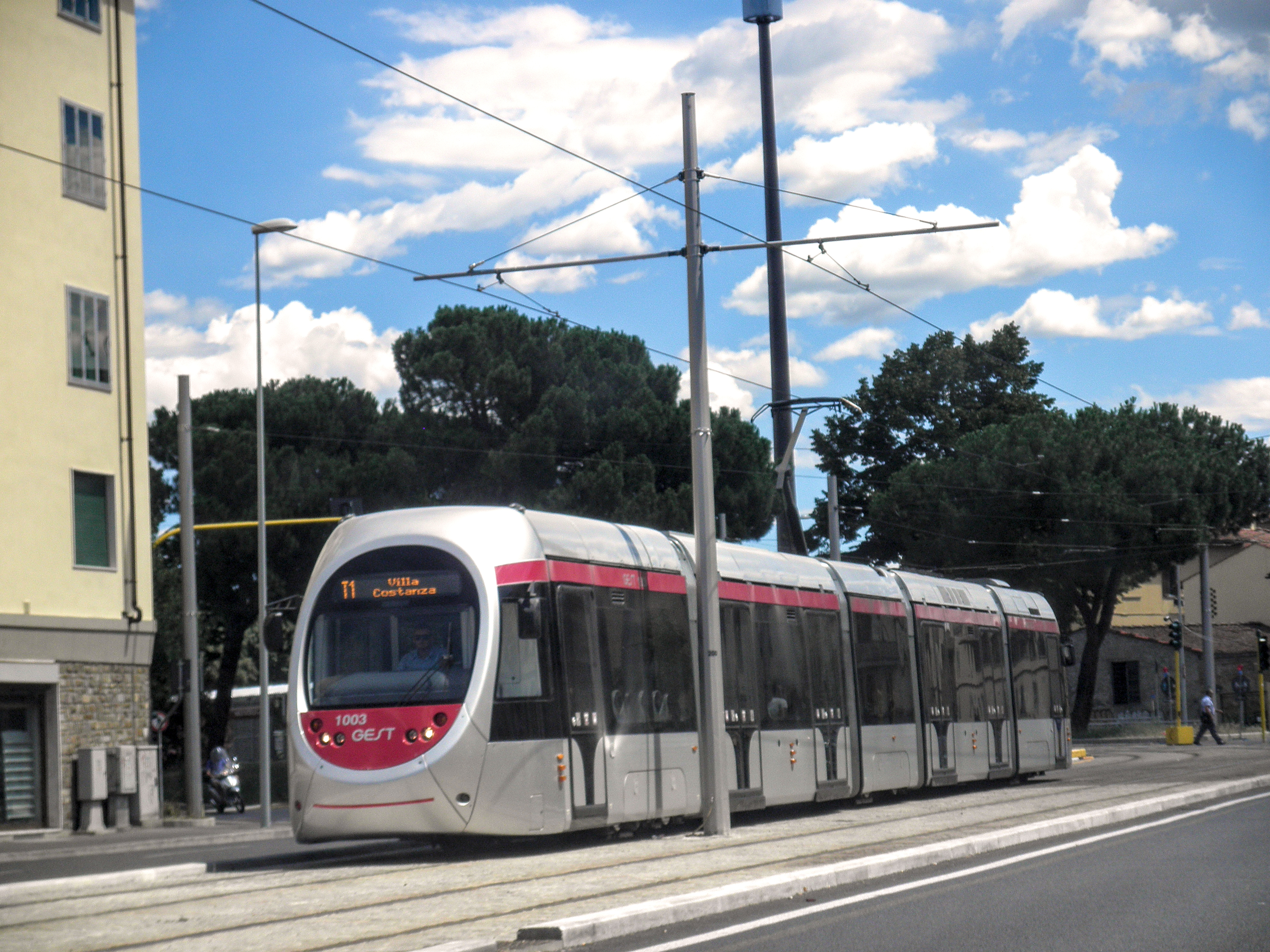
Tram in Florence, Italy.

Trams in Italy have been in constant operation since the mid-19th century. The first horse-drawn line opened in Turin in 1871, whilst the first electric line was opened in 1893 in Milan.

Current tramways in Italy are:

- Bergamo – since 2009 with 1 suburban light rail line running over 12.5 km of track, operated by TEB Bergamo; a second 11.5 km suburban line in construction, as of 2024, and is scheduled to open in 2026.
- Cagliari – since 2008 with 2 suburban light rail lines running over 12 km of track, operated by ARST.
- Florence – since 2010 with 2 urban lines running over16.8 km of track, operated by a joint venture GEST between municipal transport company ATAF Firenze and RATP Paris.
- Messina – since 2003 with 1 urban line running over 7.7 km of track, operated by ATM Messina.
- Mestre/Venice – since 2010 with 2 urban lines running over 7.7 km of track, operated by ACTV.
- Milan – since 1881 with 17 urban lines, running over 181 km of track, operated by ATM; two interurban lines were closed since 2010. Although in 2023, renovation and reconstruction works started on one of them.
- Naples – since 1875 with 3 urban lines running over 11.8 km of track, operated by ANM Napoli.
- Padua – since 2007 with 1 Translohr urban line running over 10.3 km of track, operated by APS Padova.
- Palermo – since 2015 with 4 urban lines.
- Rome – since 1877 with 6 urban lines running over 40 km of track, operated by ATAC Roma.
- Sassari – since 2006 with 1 tram-train line running over 4.3 km of track, operated by ARST.
- Trieste – since 1902 with 1 hybrid tramway-funicular railway line running over 5.2 km of track, operated by Trieste Trasporti.
- Turin – since 1871 with 9 urban lines running over 84 km of track, operated by GTT Torino.

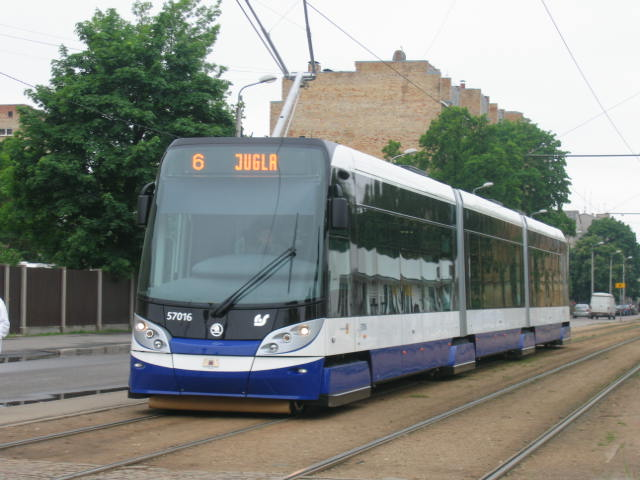
Škoda 15 T in Riga, Latvia

=== Latvia ===
There are currently three tram systems in Latvia, with six lines in Riga (start in 1882), with five lines in Daugavpils (start in 1946) and one line in Liepāja since 1899.

=== Luxembourg ===
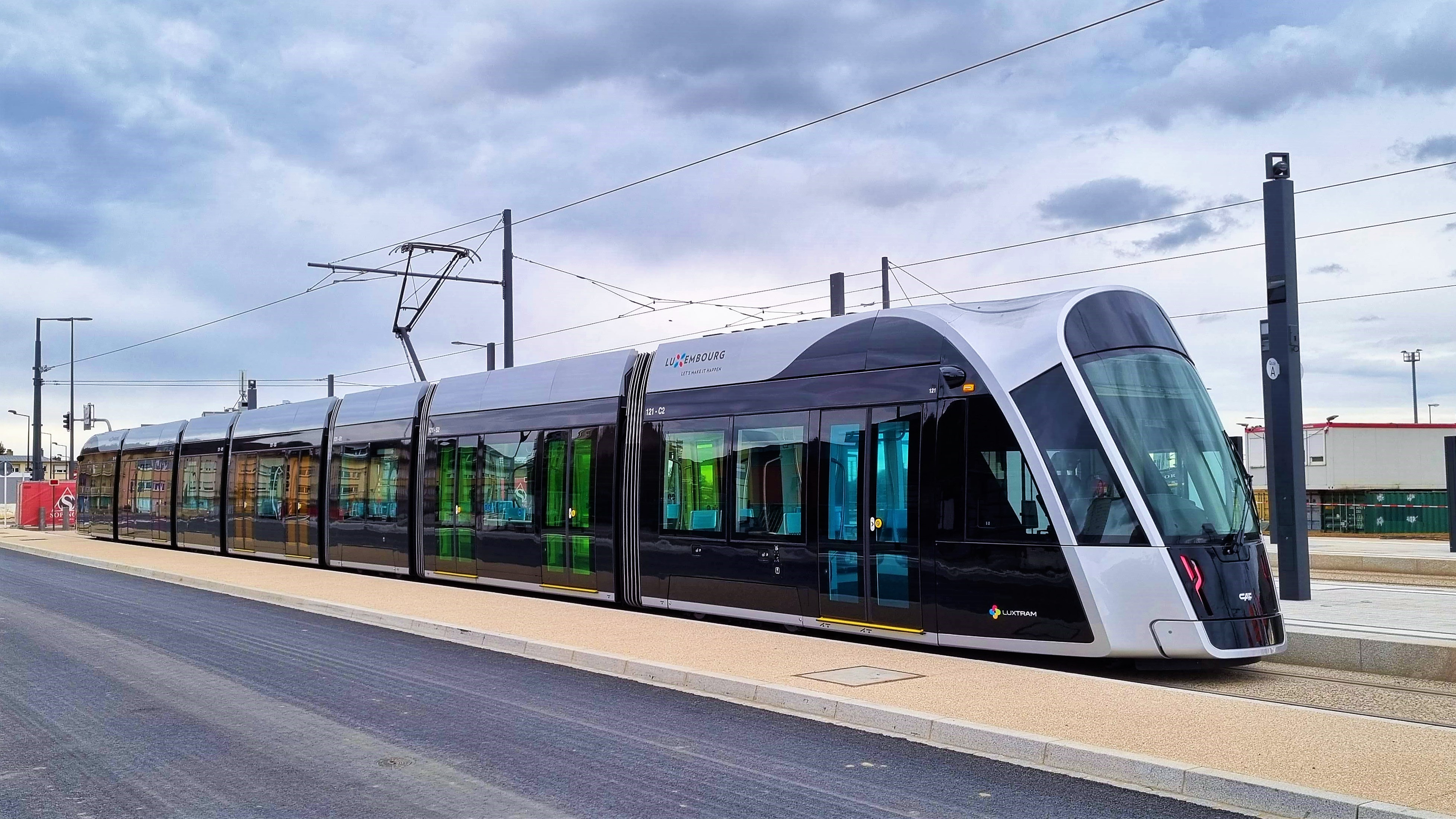
Tronçon C, Luxembourg tram

Trams began serving Luxembourg City in 1875, and in Esch-sur-Alzette in 1927. First generation trams in the country ended with the closure of the Esch-sur-Alzette network in 1956, and the Luxembourg City network in 1964. A second generation of trams began service in December 2017, along a new route, completed in 2025, from Luxembourg Airport to the Cloche d'Or business district. A network of further lines is foreseen under the National Mobility Plan 2035.

=== Malta ===
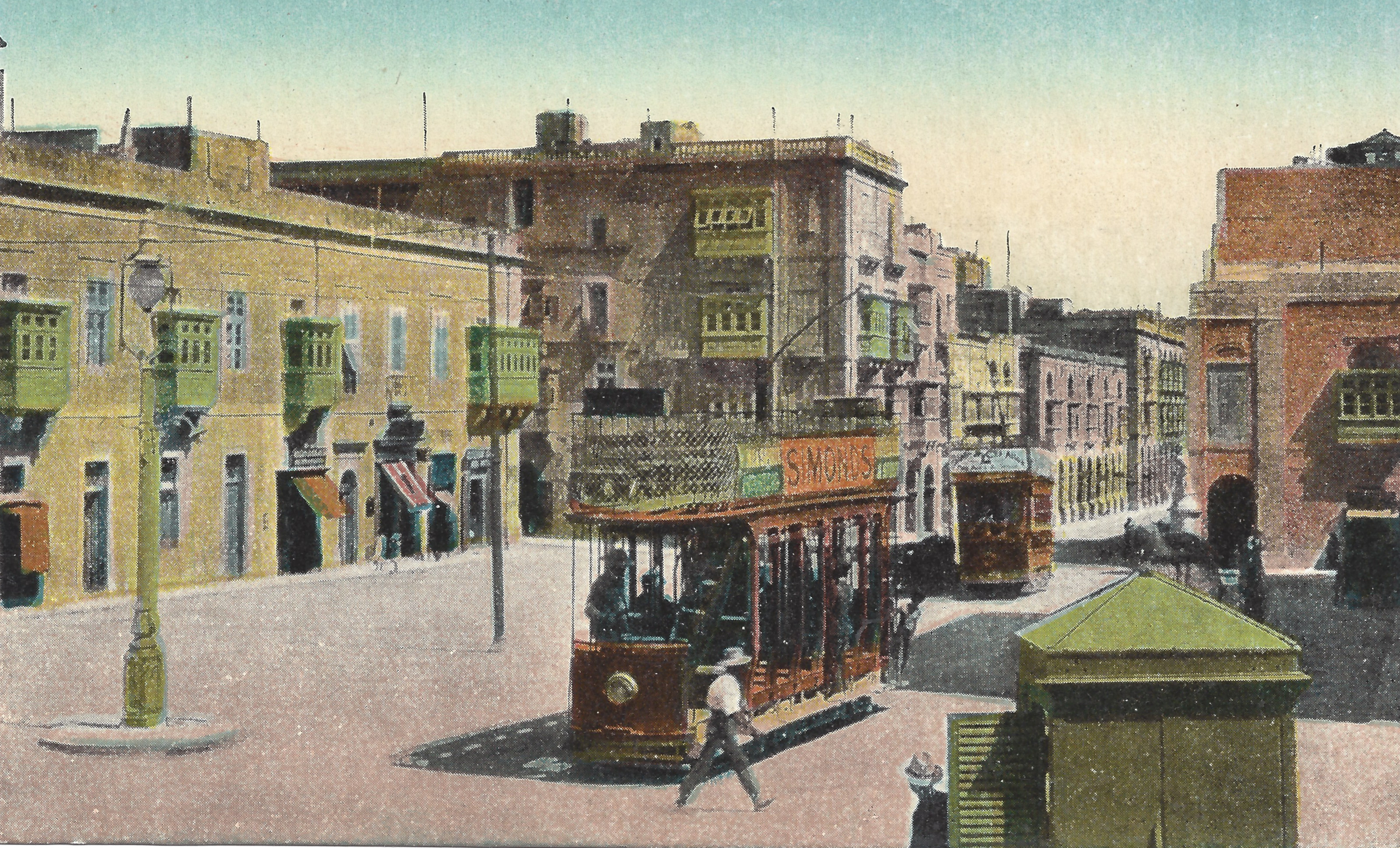
Trams in Floriana in the early 20th century

A tram service was inaugurated in Malta on 23 February 1905, linking the capital Valletta with Floriana, Ħamrun, Birkirkara, the Three Cities, Qormi and Żebbuġ. The service competed with the Malta Railway and later the Malta buses. Service eventually ceased on 15 December 1929.

The Ministry of Transport has considered the reintroduction of trams in Malta.

=== Netherlands ===
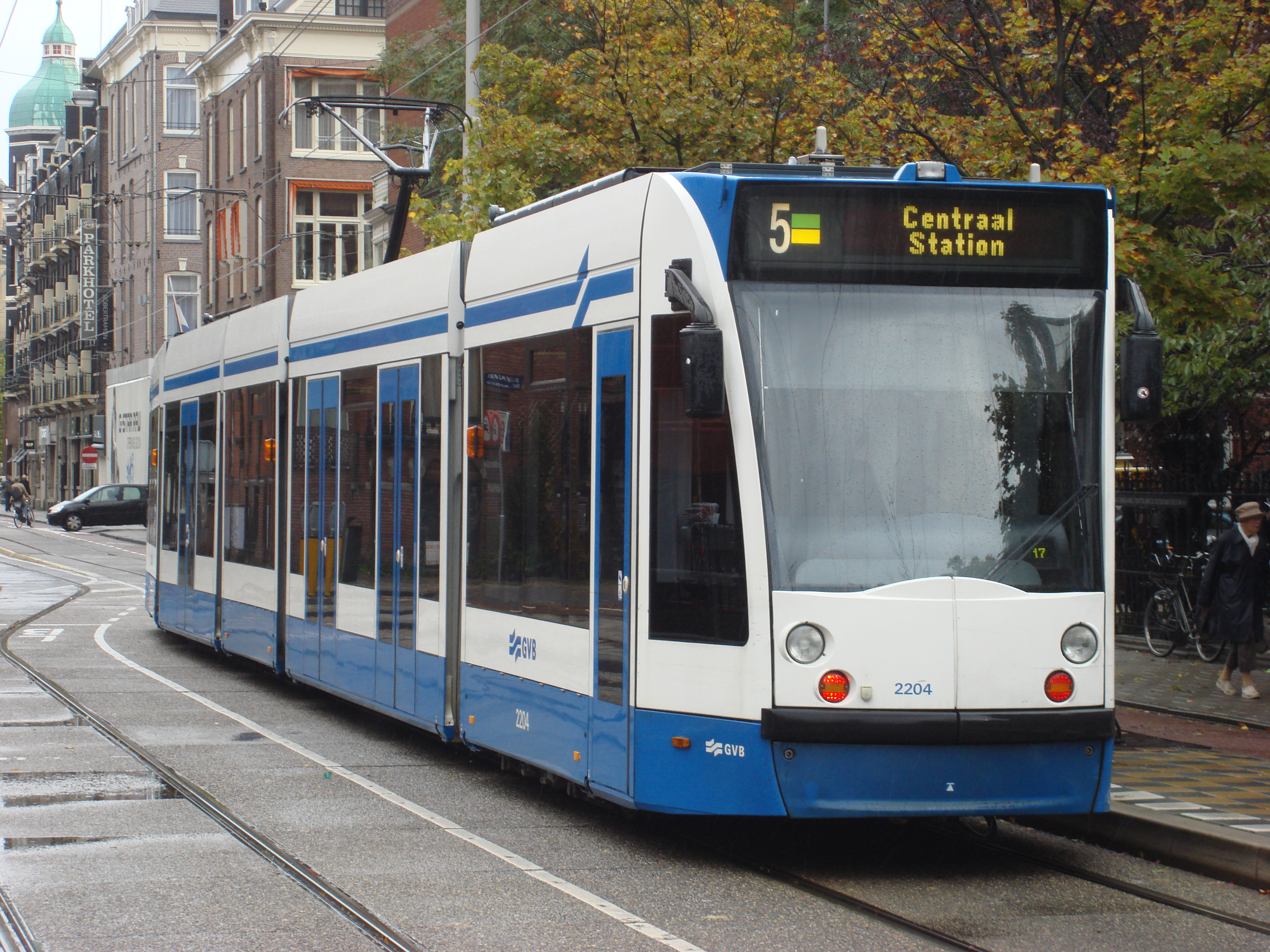
Amsterdam, GVB tram

In the Netherlands many local light railways were referred to as trams, even where the steam locomotives did not have enclosed motion. Today, extensive tram networks exist in:

- Amsterdam (GVB)
- Rotterdam (RET)
- The Hague (HTM)
- Utrecht (Qbuzz)

=== Norway ===
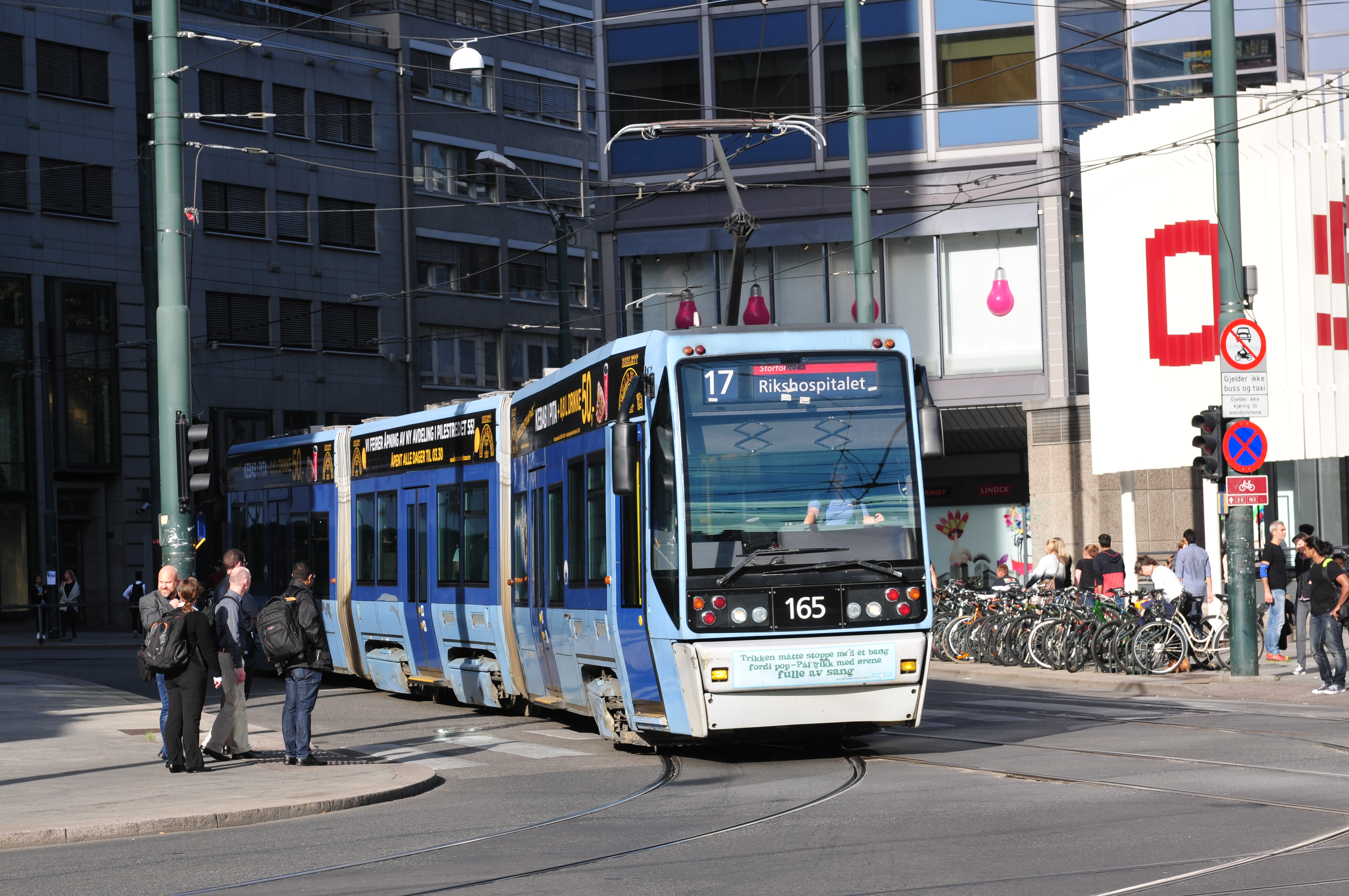
Trikk 17 Rikshospitalet ved Oslo City

There are three tramways (Norwegian: Trikk) in Norway; the Oslo Tramway that operates as a hybrid between a light rail and a street tram with six lines, and the suburban line of Trondheim Tramway, the Gråkall Line. The Bergen Tramway was closed in 1965, but the new Bergen Light Rail opened in 2010.

=== Poland ===
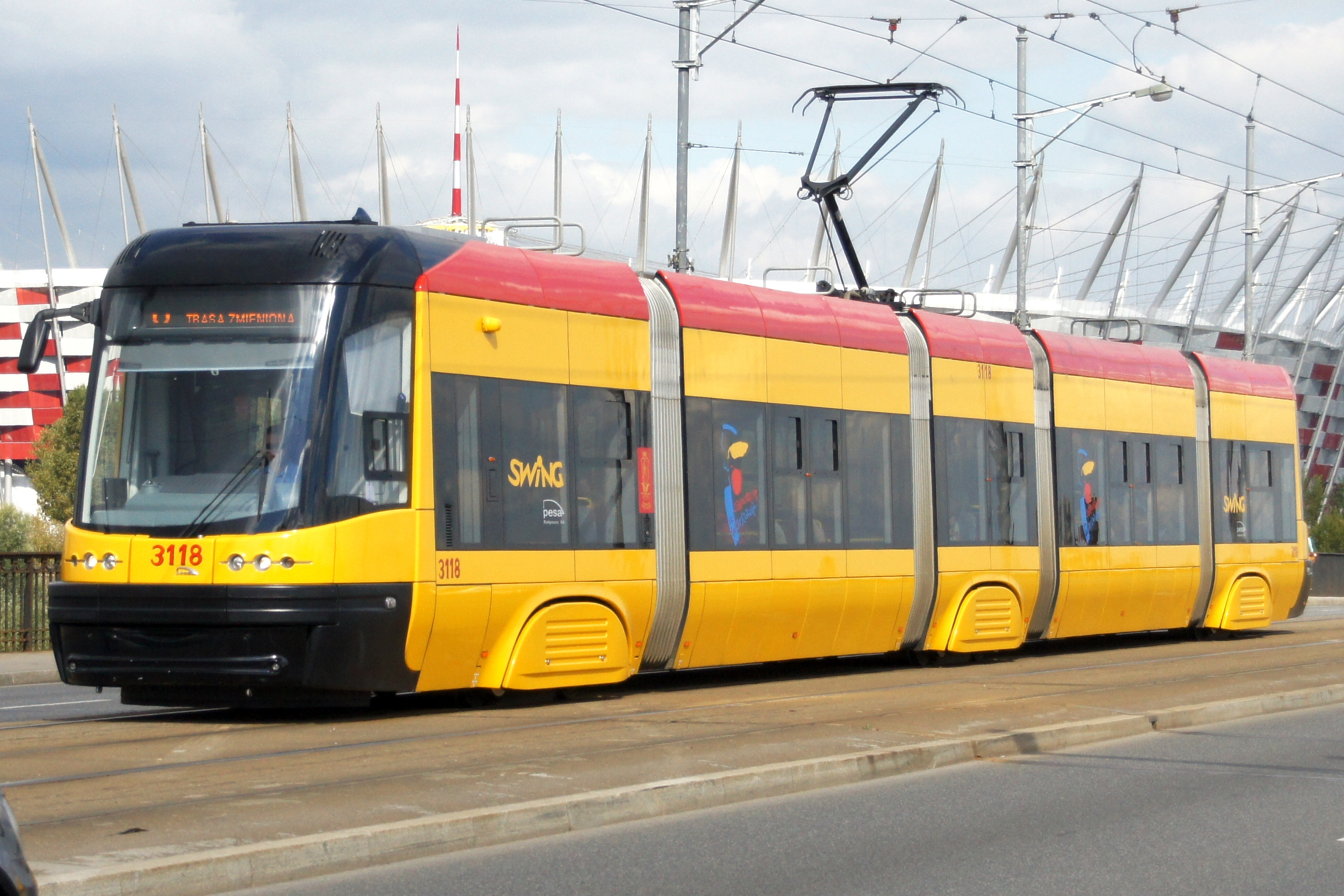
Pesa 120Na in Warsaw

Trams currently operate in 15 Polish cities/metropolises: Bydgoszcz, Częstochowa, Elbląg, Gdańsk, Gorzów Wielkopolski, Grudziądz, Katowice/Metropolis GZM, Kraków, Łódź, Olsztyn, Poznań, Szczecin, Toruń, Warsaw and Wrocław. The largest system is Silesian Interurbans in Metropolis GZM with 255 km of track and 35 lines, followed by Warsaw with 150 km of route length and 34 lines and Łódź with 124 km of route length and 28 lines. A system in Płock was planned but the construction was postponed indefinitely in 2011.

=== Portugal ===
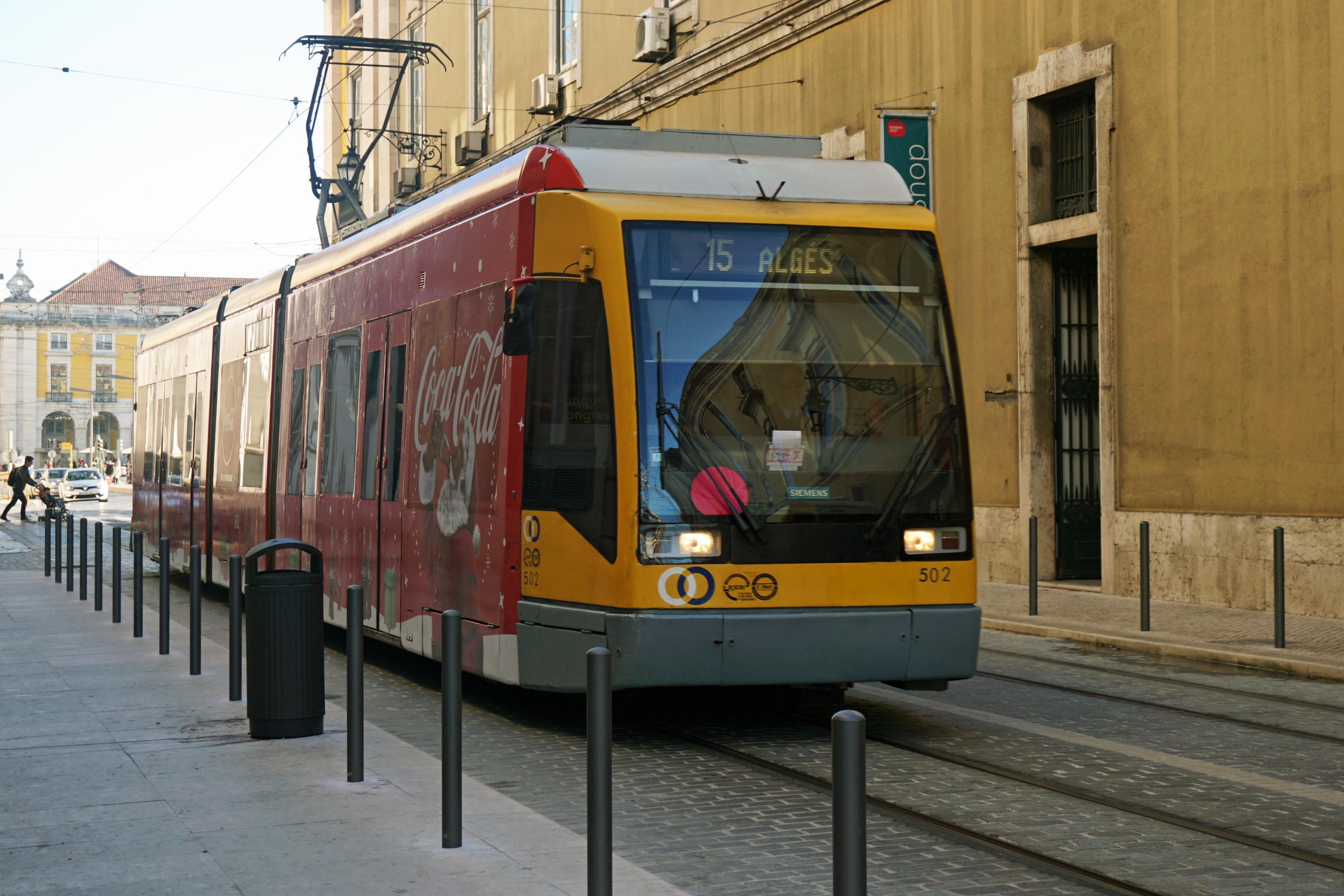
Low-floor tram (ITB1616) in Lisbon

The Lisbon tramway network has been managed by the Companhia Carris de Ferro de Lisboa, or Carris for short, for over a century. Since 1995, the fleet includes authentic vintage cars, units made from vintage bodies powered by modern engines, and fully modern articulated trams.

In Porto, a tram network has been in operation since 12 September 1895, making it the first electric tramway in the Iberian Peninsula. Many routes closed in the 1970s and 1980s, but one survived and some closed sections have reopened in the 2000s, and four routes are currently in operation.

A heritage tram line operates seasonally in Sintra. Reductions in the network's original service started in 1954, until closure in 1975. It was re-opened in 1980 using a section of the former line and surviving trams.

Almada has a light rail network, the Metro Sul do Tejo, which opened in 2007, following two decades of planning. Extensions to Seixal and Barreiro are currently planned.

=== Romania ===
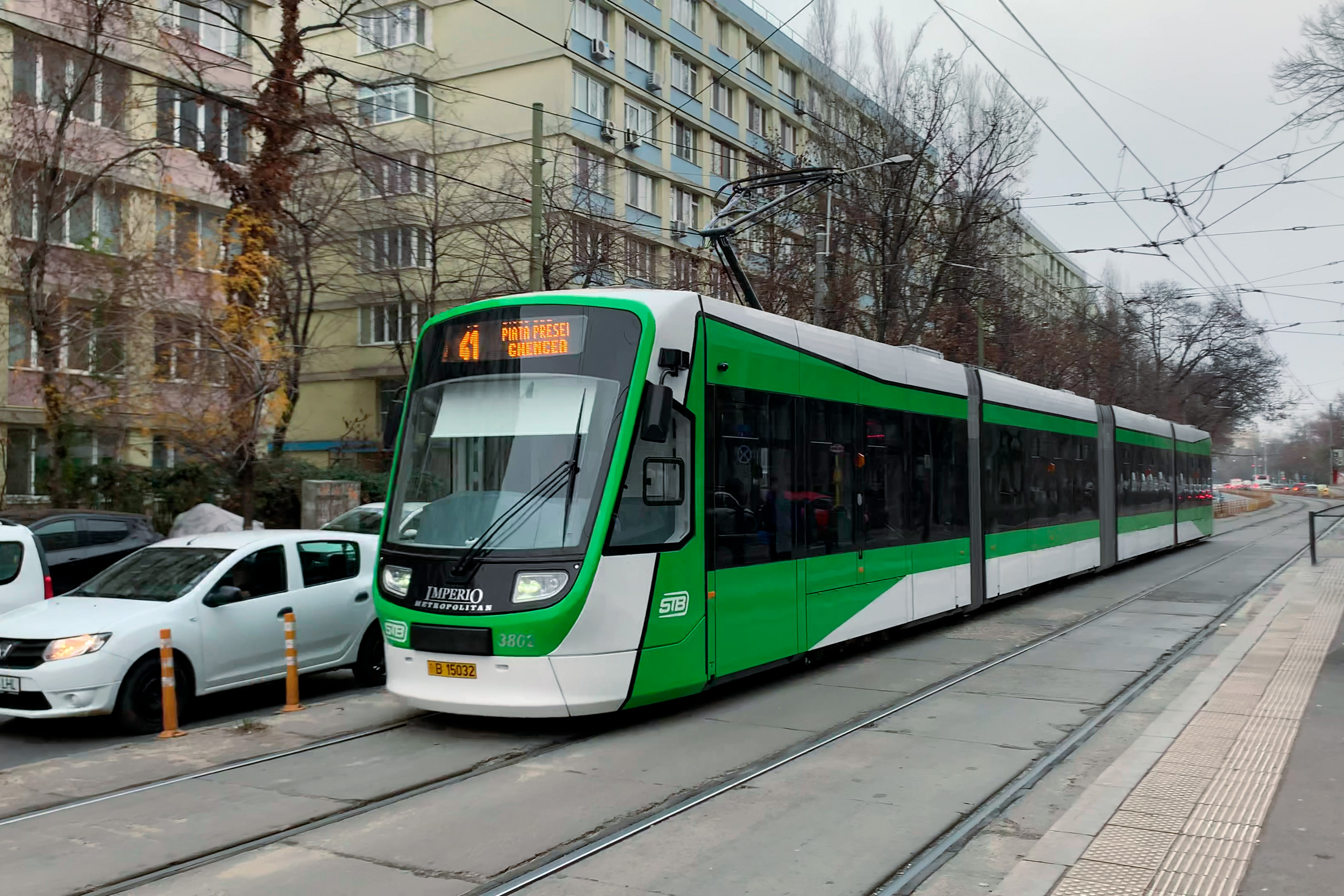
Astra Imperio Metropolitan tram in Bucharest, Romania

.

There are currently 10 tram systems in Romania, in Arad, Brăila, Bucharest, Cluj-Napoca, Craiova, Galaţi, Iaşi, Oradea, Ploieşti, Timișoara.

=== Serbia ===
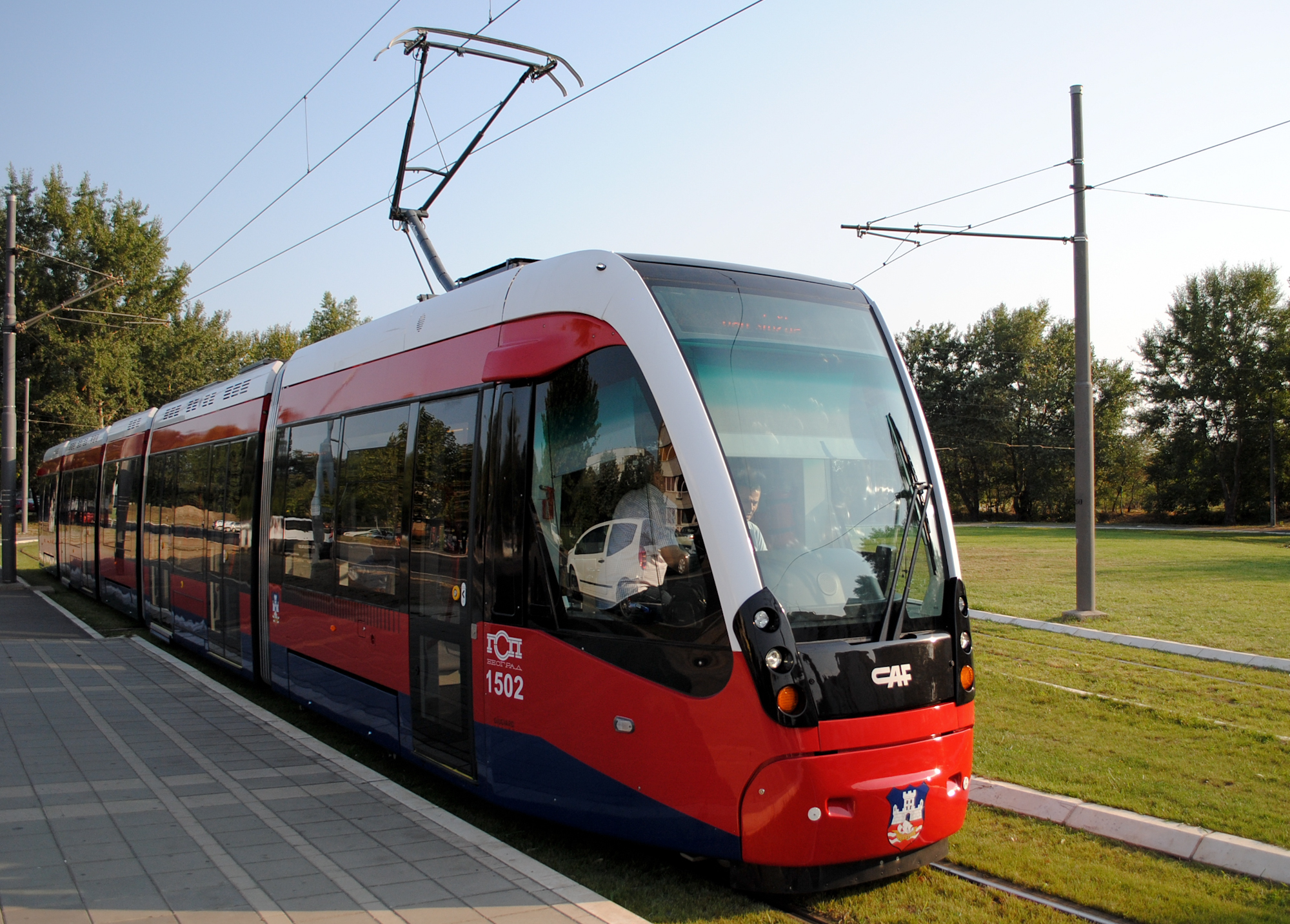
CAF Urbos 3 tram in Belgrade, Serbia

Belgrade has a large tram network with 12 lines on 127.3 km of track. The system is operated with around 250 units and with ČKD Tatra KT4 and Duewag Be 4/6 trams. The first horse-drawn tram line was introduced in October 1892 and the first electric one in 1894. There are long-term plans to build a new track to the Mirijevo neighbourhood, in the east of the city.

Previously the cities of Niš, Novi Sad, and Subotica also had tram networks, but these closed in Novi Sad and Niš in the 1950s, and in Subotica in 1974.

=== Slovakia ===
There are tram networks in both Bratislava and Košice.

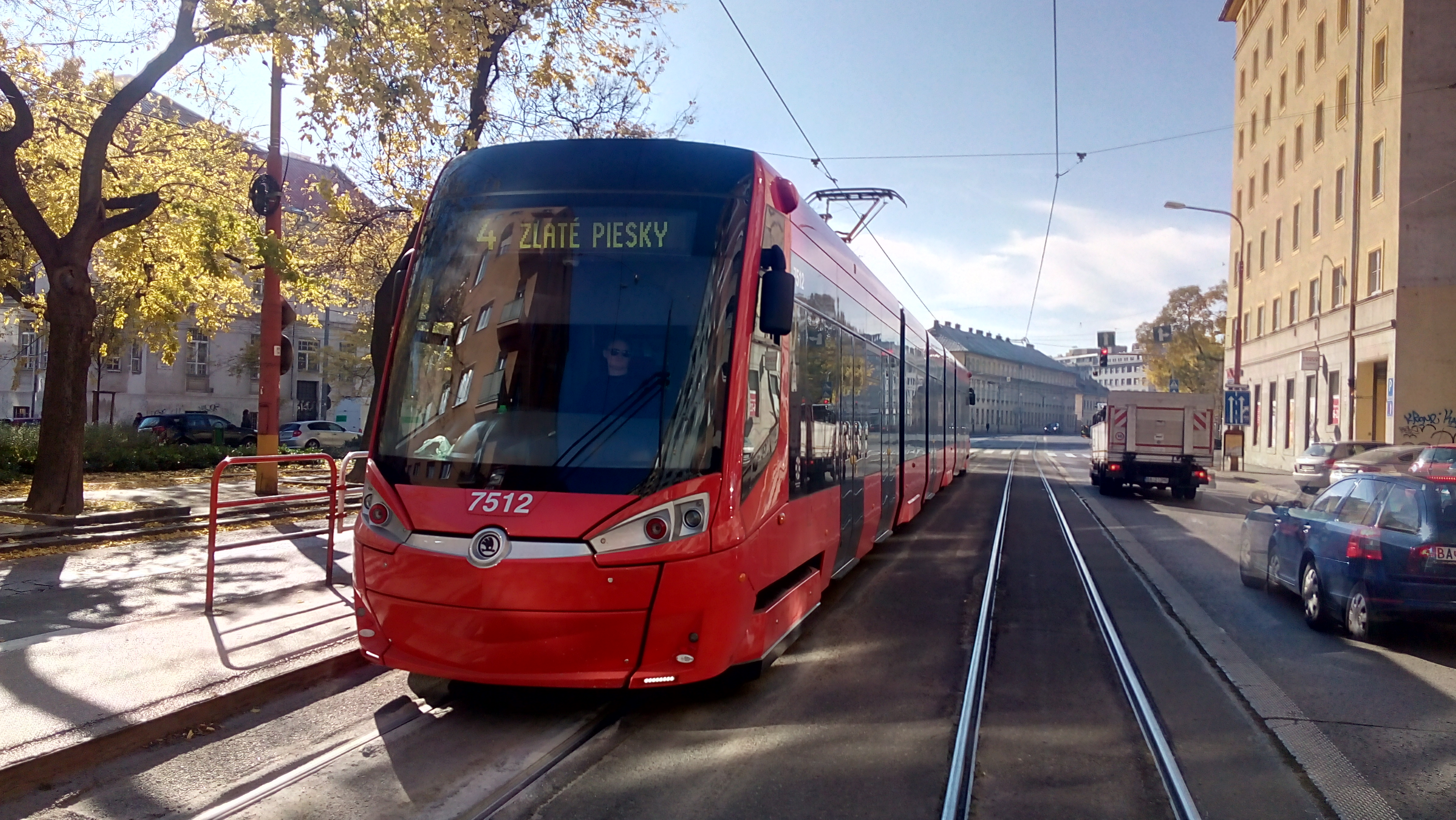
Škoda 30 T Bratislava tram Slovakia

The first trams in Bratislava started operation in 1895, and there are currently 5 lines in service with a track length of 41.5 km. A newest tram line was built across the river Danube to the Petržalka suburb on the right bank. There are multiple plans for expanding the network, but funding is currently unclear.

Košice started operating trams in 1914, after wagons pulled by horses and a steam tramway. Trams currently run over 34 km of tracks and run on 7 lines within the city and 8 fast tram lines to U. S. Steel Košice.

=== Spain ===
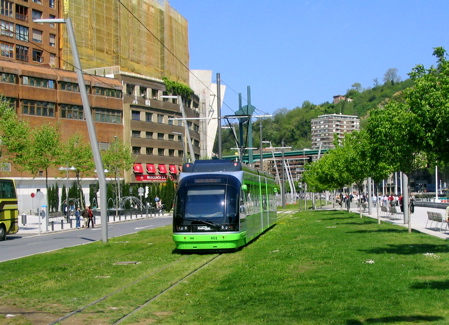
A tram running on a section of grassed track in Bilbao, Basque Country, Spain.

In Spain, modern tram networks have been opened in Alicante, Barcelona (Trambaix and Trambesòs), Bilbao, Madrid, Murcia, Parla, Santa Cruz de Tenerife, Seville, Valencia, Vélez-Málaga, Vitoria-Gasteiz and Zaragoza. Jaén had built a tram network in 2011, but it only operated for a short period.

=== Sweden ===
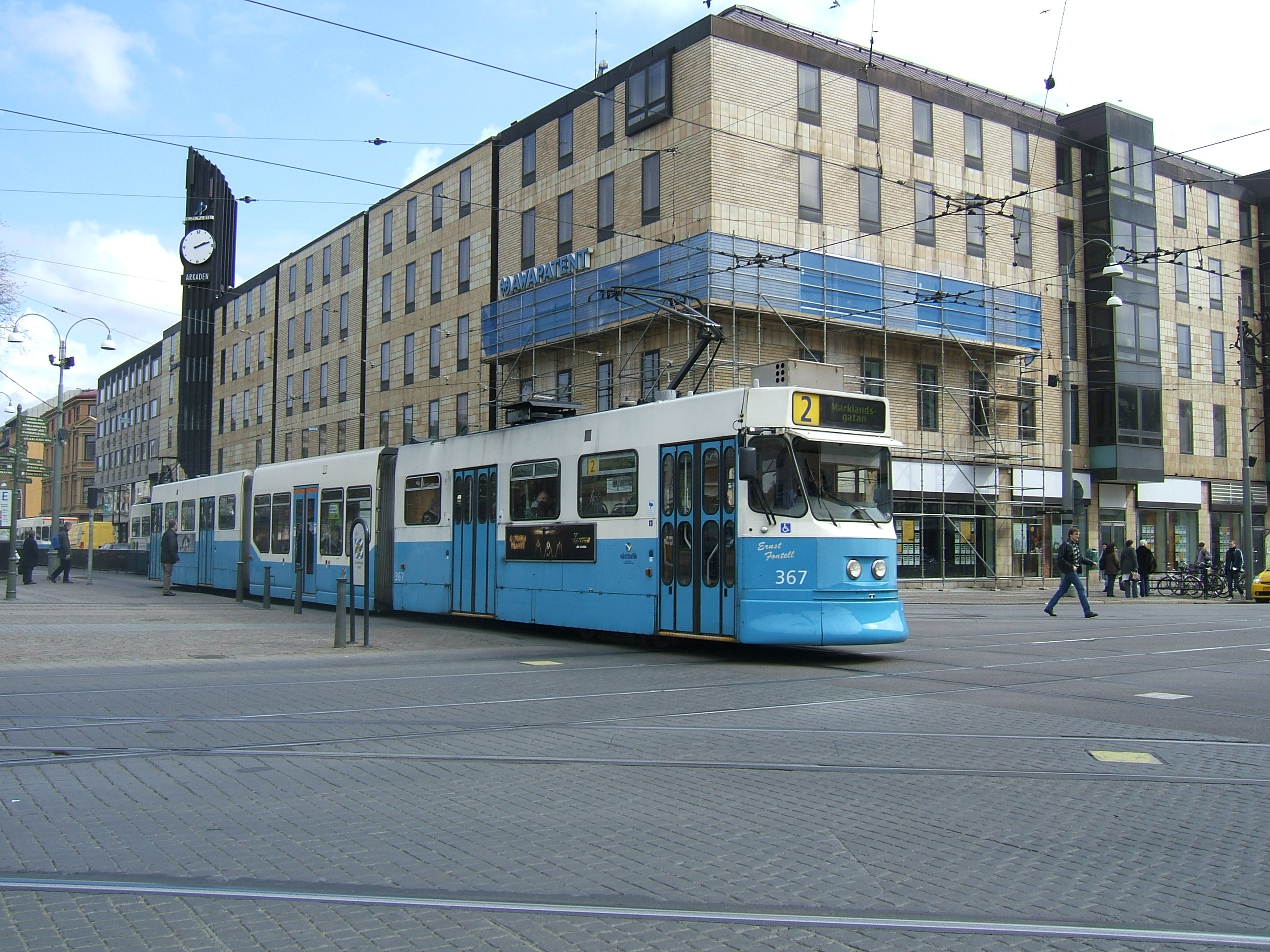
An M31 tram running in central Gothenburg.

The most extensive network in Sweden is in Gothenburg with a total track length of 173 km. Gothenburg started with the Horse Tramway in 1879 and over the years the tramway has expanded into the Nordic region's largest tramway system.

Stockholm had horse-drawn trams from 1877; however, the large tram system began to be abandoned and removed in 1957, with the last tram running in September 1967. Presently Stockholm has four lines on three non-connected systems owned by Storstockholms Lokaltrafik: Spårväg City; Lidingöbanan; Nockebybanan and Tvärbanan. There are plans for future extensions and two projects are in active development.

Norrköping has an 18.7 km tram network consisting of two radial lines, which was extended by five kilometres in 2006–2011.

Lund inaugurated its first ever tram line on 12 December 2020. At a length of 5.5 kilometers, it connects Lund Central Station with the new urban development at Brunnshög and the research facilities MAX IV and ESS.

A single-track heritage line has operated in Malmö since 1987, after the last "real" tram line closed in 1973. City officials decided in October 2008 that the city should have at least one light rail line operating before 2020, and up to six lines after that.

A combined tramway museum and heritage tramway is located at Malmköping, Södermanland County, maintained by Svenska Spårvägssällskapet, the Swedish Tramway Society.

=== Switzerland ===
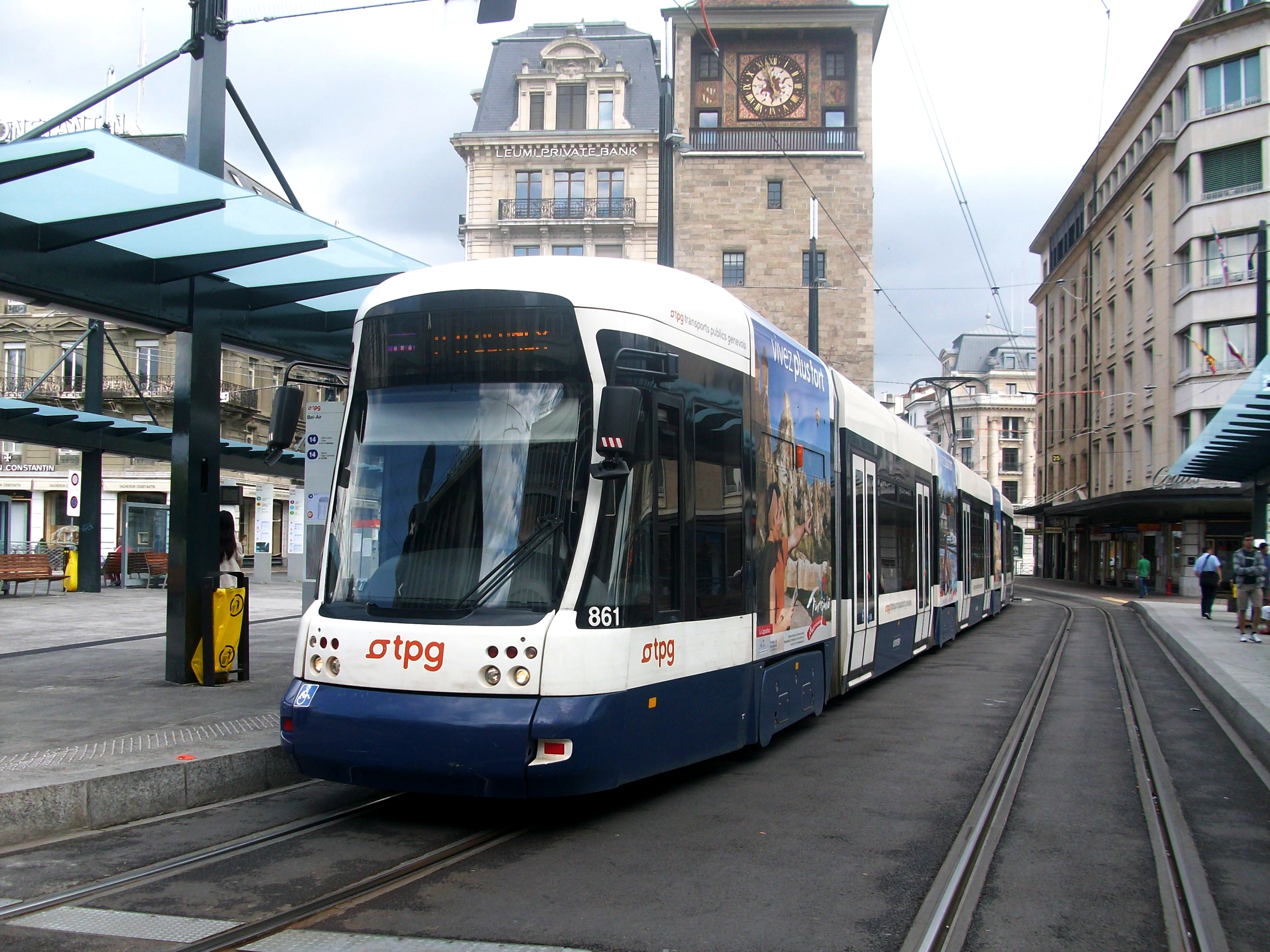
A tram in Bel-Air stop, Geneva

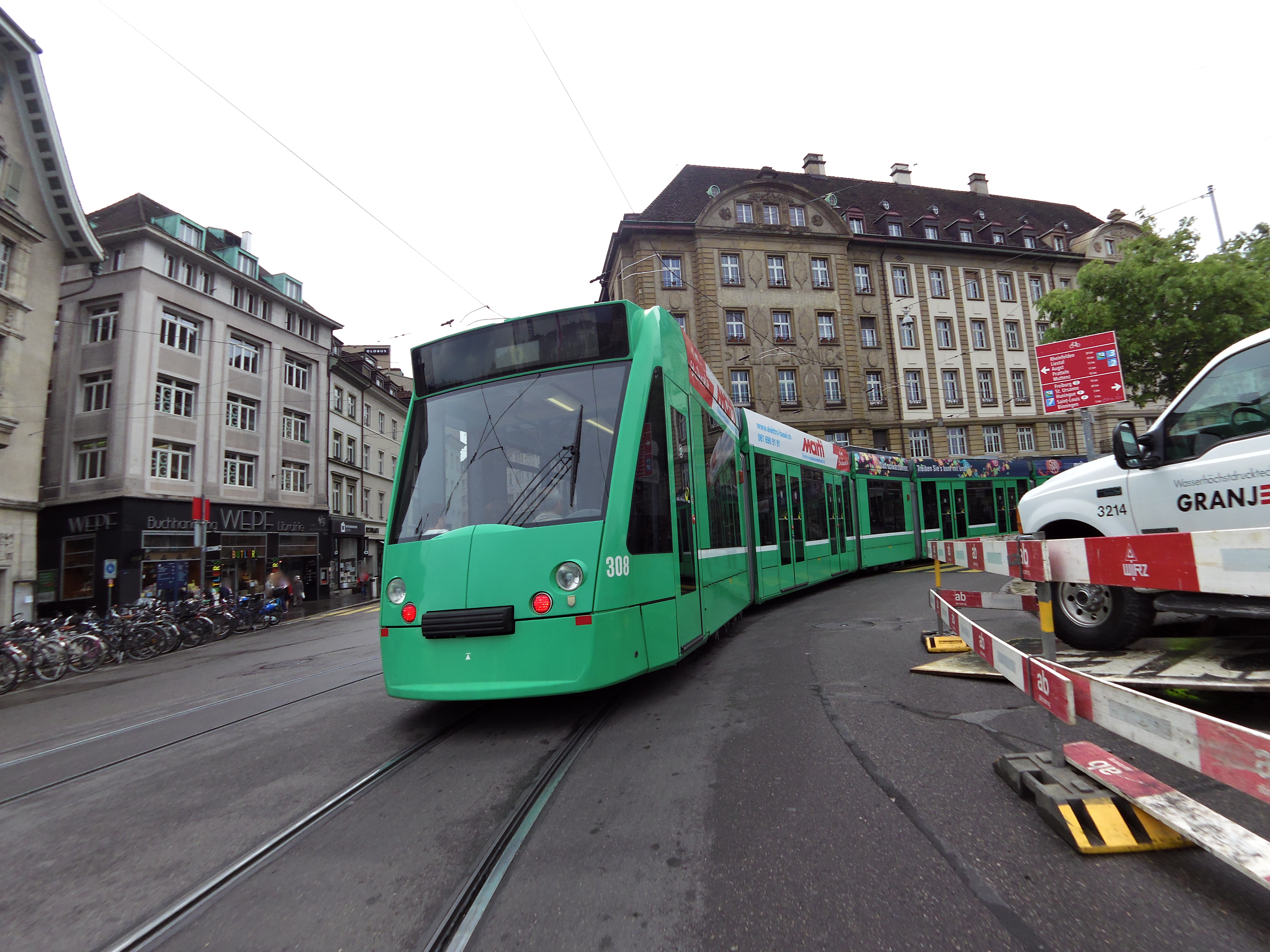
A tram in Basel

The first tram in Switzerland began operations in 1862 in Geneva. The tram, which was initially horse-drawn, got converted to steam in 1877. In 1888 the second electric tram system in the world was inaugurated in Vevey, linking the city to Montreux and Château de Chillon. By 1923, a total of 29 towns and cities in the country operated tram networks, and at 170 km in extension and operating beyond the country's borders into France, Geneva's tram network became Europe's largest system

After WW2 and the introduction of buses and trolleybuses, many of the networks shrunk. Geneva lost all but one of its lines, and some cities closed their trams, including Fribourg, Lausanne, Lugano, Biel/Bienne, Luzern, Vevey, Montreux, St. Gallen, Schaffhausen, or Zug.

However, Switzerland is remarkable in that a few major cities kept their networks mostly intact until today. For example, although some of the tram lines extending beyond the city of Zurich closed down, the vast majority of lines within the city did not suffer any closures. Similarly, Bern and Basel kept most of their tram lines intact.

Because, with the exception of Geneva and Lausanne, the country's major cities have not lost their tram systems, Switzerland has not witnessed a major re-construction of trams as happened in the rest of Europe in the decades following the 1990s. The major exception is Geneva, where the system has been growing back again from the one line and 8 km that was left out of its original network, to 5 lines and 36 km. By the end of 2019, with the opening of line 17, the network had once again extended over the border to the French city of Annemasse, with planned future extensions to over 50 km by 2026.

=== Turkey ===
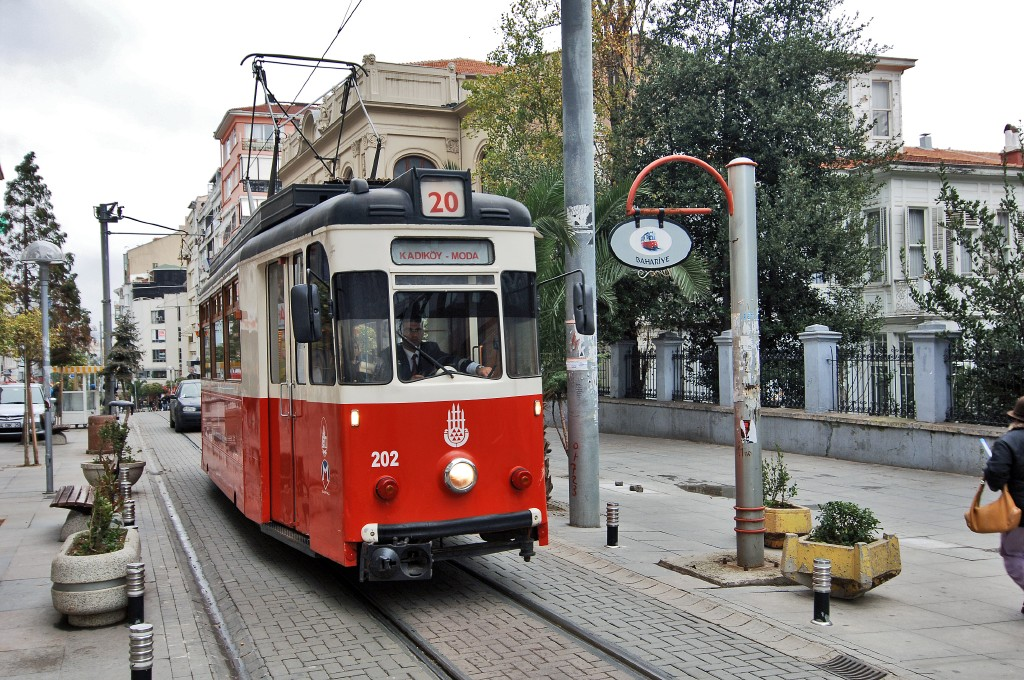
Recently revived historic tram line in Kadıköy, Istanbul

The first tram line in Istanbul was constructed by Konstantin Karapano Efendi, and started operating on 31 July 1871 between the districts of Azapkapi and Ortaköy. In 1869, the tram company "Dersaadet Tramvay Şirketi" was established. 430 horses were used to draw the 45 carriages, including 15 summer-type and some double-deckers, on meter gauge track. In 1912, the horse-drawn tram had to cease to operate for one year because the Ministry of Defence sent all the horses to the front during the Balkan War. The tram network was electrified by overhead contact wire on 2 February 1914. The tram began to run on the Anatolian part of Istanbul on 8 June 1928 between Üsküdar and Kisikli. By the 1950s, the length of the tram lines reached 130 km. Trams were in service on the European part until 12 August 1961 and on the Anatolian part until 14 November 1966.

Heritage trams returned to Istiklal Caddesi in 1990 and in Moda in 2003. Modern trams began service on the European side in 1992 and have since been expanded. The latest addition to the system, as of 2021 was the T5 line running along the Golden Horn.

Istanbul is the only city in European Turkey with operating trams. In Anatolia, there are operating trams in Adana, Antalya, Bursa, Eskişehir, Gaziantep, Kayseri, Kocaeli, Konya, Samsun and İzmir.

=== Ukraine ===
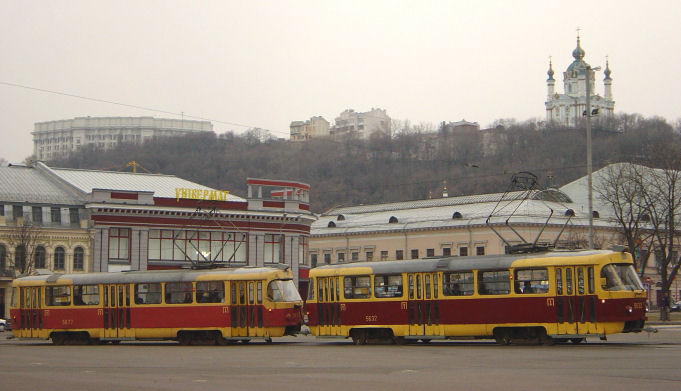
Trams in Kyiv's Kontraktova Square. The St. Andrew Church is visible in the right background.

The history of electric traction in Ukraine began in Kyiv, where an electric tram line started operation on 13 June 1892. It was the first electric tram in the Russian Empire, constructed by Amand Struve to address the city's steep topography. Electric systems were subsequently introduced in Lviv (1894), Yekaterinoslav (now Dnipro, 1897), and Zhytomyr (1899).

On 30 December 1978, the Kyiv Fast Tram began operation. On the initiative of Volodymyr Veklych and Vasyl Dyakonov, this was the first high-speed tram system in the USSR. In 1986, the Kryvyi Rih Metrotram was opened, which utilizes underground tunnels for a significant portion of its route.

Following independence in 1991, the industry saw the emergence of domestic manufacturers such as Tatra-Yug and Electron. However, during the 1990s and 2000s, many networks faced significant decline due to economic instability and urban policies that prioritized automobile traffic over fixed-rail transport. This resulted in the removal of tracks from several city centers and bridges, alongside the widespread rise of private minibuses (marshrutkas) as a primary competitor. While some systems faced contraction, cities like Vinnytsia, Lviv, and Kyiv have since undergone significant modernization, including the acquisition of modern low-floor rolling stock and the integration of electronic ticketing.

Currently, tram systems operate in many Ukrainian cities, including Kyiv, Kharkiv, Odesa, Dnipro, Zaporizhzhia, and Mykolaiv. Most systems use the Russian gauge (1,524 mm), while Lviv, Vinnytsia, and Zhytomyr maintain metre gauge (1,000 mm) networks. Despite the challenges of the Russo-Ukrainian War, tram networks continue to function as a backbone of municipal transport, with ongoing resilience and reconstruction efforts.

=== United Kingdom ===
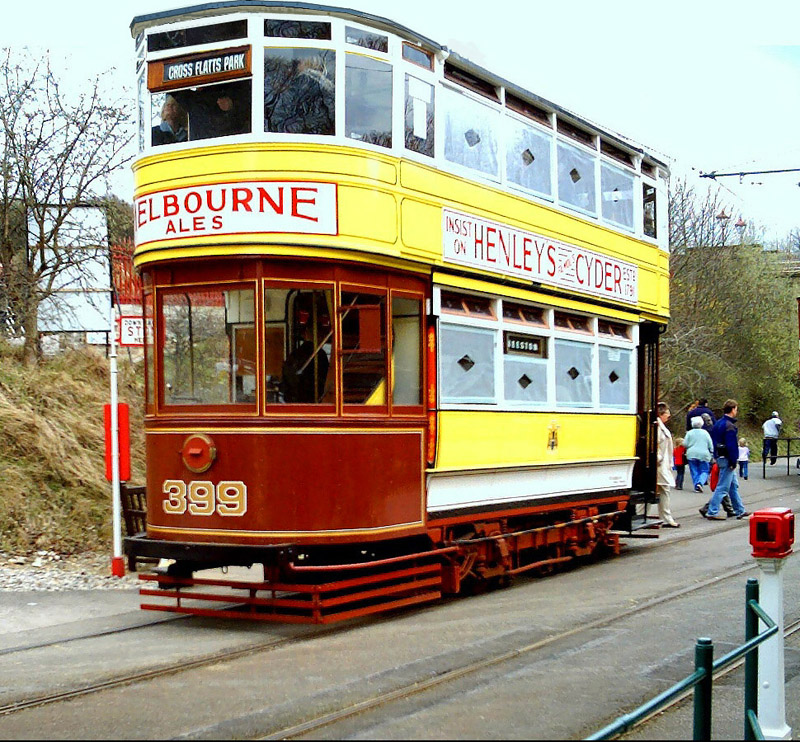
An old Double decker tram preserved at the National Tramway Museum (from the former Leeds Tramway)

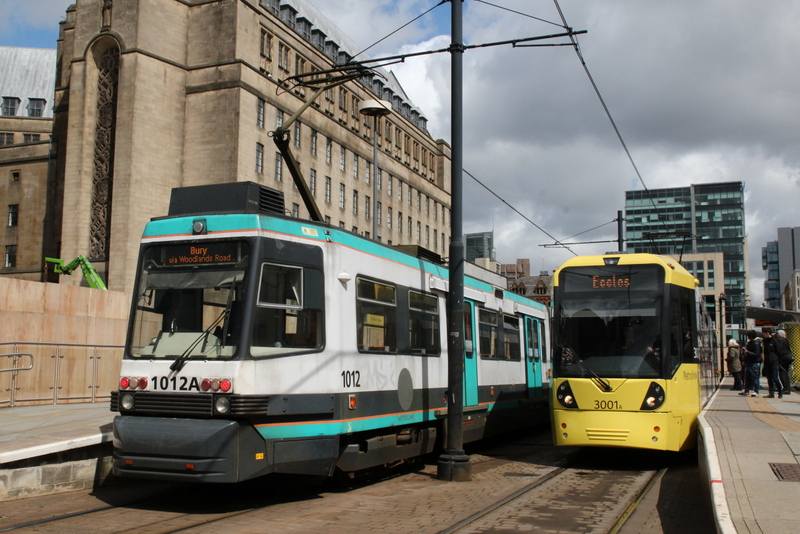
Manchester Metrolink

Until 1935 there was a large and comprehensive network of tram systems. For example, one could travel by tram across northwest England, from Liverpool to Ashton-under-Lyne (approx. 43 miles) using connecting systems. Most UK systems were municipally owned. These had often been inherited from private sector operators, who had been granted limited-term leases and did not maintain their networks beyond bare necessities as the time for a forced handover approached. When councils acquired these dilapidated systems, it was almost always cheaper to replace them with buses. The 1931 Royal Commission on traffic argued that trams held up cars.

There was some public reaction against tramway abandonment, but seemingly less than the similarly unsuccessful reaction against Beeching cuts in the 1960s. Some people, particularly motorists, welcomed the removal of trams, which were perceived as obstructing the highway. Not all passengers transferred to replacement buses, and car ownership continued to increase.

Britain's tram systems were mainly dismantled between 1920 and 1960, and after the closure of Glasgow's once extensive GCT network in 1962, only Blackpool's trams survived, although the Great Orme Tramway funicular line continued to operate up the Great Orme in Llandudno.

Since the 1990s, a second generation of tram networks have been built and have started operating in Manchester in 1992, Sheffield in 1994, the West Midlands in 1999, South London in 2000, Nottingham in 2004 and Edinburgh in 2014, whilst the original trams in Blackpool were upgraded to second generation vehicles in 2012.

There have been numerous other proposals for tramways in other cities and extensions to existing systems the UK, whilst the system in the West Midlands is currently having extensions built.

On the Isle of Man, electric tram cars have run almost continuously since the late 19th century (albeit mainly as summer tourist attractions) on the Manx Electric Railway (Douglas to Ramsey) and the Snaefell Mountain Railway (Laxey to Snaefell summit), as well as horse trams along Douglas Promenade.

=== Former USSR/Russia and CIS ===
In many cities of Russia, Ukraine, Armenia, Georgia, Azerbaijan and Uzbekistan tramways have been facing difficulties since the disintegration of the USSR. Tramways of Shakhty, Arkhangelsk, Astrakhan, Grozny, Tbilisi, Baku, Yerevan, Almaty, Sumqayit, Gandja and Tashkent have been abandoned. Some tramway systems have suffered extensive closures of vital parts of network (including Saint Petersburg, Moscow, Kyiv) and some are facing threats of closures (Nizhniy Novgorod) or even total abandonment (Voronezh).

The tramway network in Saint Petersburg is the largest in Europe, and was once the second-largest in the world, surpassed only by Pacific Electric's 160 km network in Los Angeles. The network in Melbourne, Australia, is now larger.

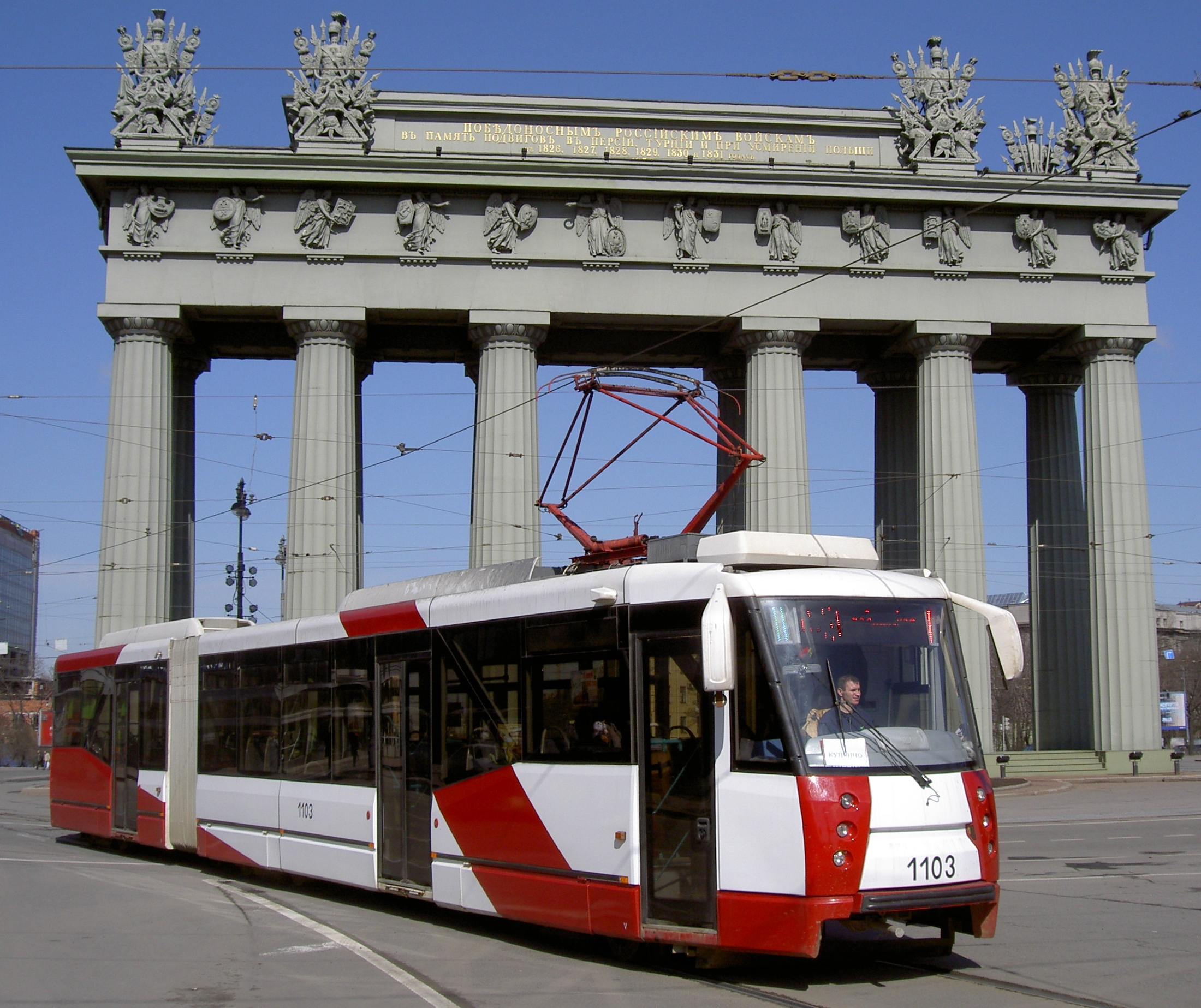
Tram on Moscow Gate Square in Saint Petersburg.

== See also ==
- List of light-rail and tramway systems in Europe
- List of town tramway systems in Europe
- Bucharest Articulated Tramcar
- Tram
- Light rail
