= Constitution of Yugoslavia =

The Constitution of Yugoslavia may refer to:

== Chronology ==
Kingdom of Serbs, Croats and Slovenes

1921 Vidovdan Constitution

Kingdom of Yugoslavia (1929)

1931 Yugoslav Constitution

Federal People's Republic of Yugoslavia

1946 Yugoslav Constitution

1953 Yugoslav constitutional amendments

Socialist Federal Republic of Yugoslavia

1963 Yugoslav Constitution
1974 Yugoslav Constitution

Federal Republic of Yugoslavia

1992 Yugoslav Constitution

== See also ==
- Constitution of Bosnia and Herzegovina
- Constitution of Croatia
- Constitution of Kosovo
- Constitution of Montenegro
- Constitution of North Macedonia
- Constitution of Serbia
- Constitution of Slovenia
- Constitutional Charter of Serbia and Montenegro
