= Yugoslavia =

1918–1992 country in Southeast Europe

Yugoslavia Jugoslavija / Југославија (Note: Serbo-Croatian: Jugoslavija / Југославија [juɡǒslaːʋija]; Slovene: Jugoslavija [juɡɔˈslàːʋija]; Macedonian: Југославија [juɡɔˈsɫavija]; See also: Languages of Yugoslavia.)
- 1918–1992; 1941–1945: Axis occupation
- Flags: Top (1918–1945); Bottom (1946–1992) Top: Coat of arms (1918–1945); Bottom: Emblem (1963–1992)
- Anthem: "Anthem of the Kingdom of Yugoslavia" (1919–1945) "Hey, Slavs" (1945–1992)
- Yugoslavia during the Interwar period (top) and the Cold War (bottom)
- Capital and largest city: Belgrade; 44.8200°N 20.4275°E
- Official languages: Serbo-Croato-Slovene (before 1944); Serbo-Croatian (de facto; from 1944)
- Demonym: Yugoslav
- History
  - Creation: 1 December 1918
  - Axis invasion: 6 April 1941
  - Abolition of monarchy: 29 November 1945
  - Disintegration: 27 April 1992

Population
  - 1955: 17,522,438
  - 1965: 19,489,605
  - 1975: 21,441,297
  - 1985: 23,121,383
  - 1991: 23,532,279
- Currency: Yugoslav dinar
- Calling code: 38
- ISO 3166 code: YU
- Internet TLD: .yu
Preceded by
| Serbia |
| Montenegro |
| State of Slovenes, Croats and Serbs |
| Austria-Hungary |
| Fiume |
Succeeded by
| Croatia |
| Slovenia |
| Republic of Macedonia |
| Republic of Bosnia and Herzegovina |
| Federal Republic of Yugoslavia |

Yugoslavia (/ˌjuːɡoʊˈslɑːviə/; lit. 'Land of the South Slavs') was a country in Central Europe and the Balkans that existed from 1918 to 1992. It came into existence following World War I, (Note: The Yugoslav Committee, led by Dalmatian Croat politician Ante Trumbić, lobbied the Allies to support the creation of an independent South Slavic state and delivered the proposal in the Corfu Declaration on 20 July 1917.) under the name of the Kingdom of Serbs, Croats and Slovenes, from the merger of the Kingdom of Serbia with the provisional State of Slovenes, Croats and Serbs, and constituted the first union of South Slavic peoples as a sovereign state, following centuries of foreign rule over the region under the Ottoman Empire and the Habsburg monarchy.

Under the rule of the House of Karađorđević, the kingdom gained international recognition on 13 July 1922 at the Conference of Ambassadors in Paris and was renamed the Kingdom of Yugoslavia on 3 October 1929. Peter I was the country's first sovereign. Upon his father's death in 1921, Alexander I went on to rule the country through an extended period of political crisis that culminated in the 6 January Dictatorship and, ultimately, his assassination in 1934. Prince Paul headed the state as a prince regent until Alexander's son Peter II was declared of-age, which happened following the Yugoslav coup d'état in March 1941. Alexander I was the longest reigning of the three Yugoslav monarchs.

The kingdom was invaded and occupied by the Axis powers in April 1941, marking the start of World War II in Yugoslavia. The Communist-led Partisan resistance went on to proclaim the Democratic Federal Yugoslavia and acquire the backing of the Allies at the Tehran Conference in late November 1943. In 1944, King Peter II, then living in exile, gave his recognition to the Anti-Fascist Council for the National Liberation of Yugoslavia as the legitimate government. In November 1945, after the war ended, the regency council appointed by the King called a parliamentary election that established the Constituent Assembly of Yugoslavia. The Constituent Assembly proclaimed Yugoslavia a federal republic on 29 November 1945, thus abolishing monarchical rule. This marked the onset of a four-decade long uncontested communist party rule of the country. The newly proclaimed Federal People's Republic of Yugoslavia acquired the territories of Istria, Rijeka, and Zadar from Italy. Partisan leader Josip Broz Tito ruled the country from 1944 until his death in 1980, first as the prime minister and later as the president. In 1963, the country was renamed for the final time, as the Socialist Federal Republic of Yugoslavia (SFRY).

The six constituent republics that made up the SFRY were the socialist republics of Bosnia and Herzegovina, Croatia, Macedonia, Montenegro, Serbia, and Slovenia. Within Serbia were the two socialist autonomous provinces, Kosovo and Vojvodina, which, following the adoption of the 1974 Yugoslav Constitution, were largely equal to the other members of the federation. After an economic and political crisis and the rise of nationalism and ethnic conflicts following Tito's death, Yugoslavia broke up along its republics' borders during the Revolutions of 1989, at first into five countries, leading to the Yugoslav Wars. From 1993 to 2017, the International Criminal Tribunal for the former Yugoslavia tried political and military leaders from the former Yugoslavia for war crimes, genocide, and other crimes committed during those wars.

After the breakup, the republics of Montenegro and Serbia formed a reduced federative state, the Federal Republic of Yugoslavia (FRY). This state aspired to the status of sole legal successor to the SFRY, but those claims were opposed by the other former republics. Eventually, it accepted the opinion of the Badinter Arbitration Committee about shared succession and in 2003, its official name was changed to the State Union of Serbia and Montenegro. This state dissolved when Montenegro and Serbia each became independent states in 2006, with Kosovo having an ongoing dispute over its declaration of independence in 2008.

== Background ==
The concept of Yugoslavia, as a common state for all South Slavic peoples, emerged in the late 17th century and gained prominence through the Illyrian Movement of the 19th century. The name was created by the combination of the Slavic words jug ("south") and Slaveni/Sloveni (Slavs). Moves towards the formal creation of Yugoslavia accelerated after the 1917 Corfu Declaration between the Yugoslav Committee and the government of the Kingdom of Serbia.

== Kingdom of Yugoslavia ==
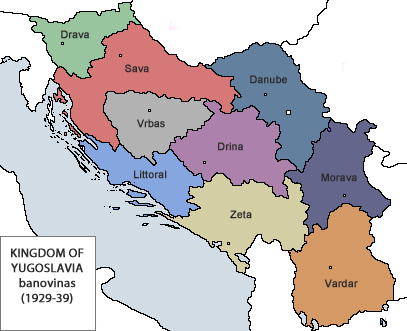
Banovinas, or subdivisions, of Yugoslavia, 1929–39. After 1939, the Sava and Littoral banovinas were merged into the Banovina of Croatia.

The country was formed in 1918 immediately after World War I as the Kingdom of Serbs, Croats and Slovenes by union of the State of Slovenes, Croats and Serbs and the Kingdom of Serbia. It was commonly referred to at the time as a "Versailles state". Later, King Alexander I renamed the country Yugoslavia in 1929.

Austria-Hungary collapsed after World War I in 1918. Bačka, Banat and Baranja were annexed, and the Podgorica Assembly led to the unification of the Kingdom of Montenegro into Serbia. Međimurje was occupied and held by the Yugoslav forces, and Prekmurje was occupied twice before it was held. The subsequent Treaty of Trianon in 1920 formally ceded the northern territories from Hungary to Yugoslavia.

=== King Alexander's rule ===
On 20 June 1928, Serb deputy Puniša Račić shot at five members of the opposition Croatian Peasant Party in the National Assembly, resulting in the death of two deputies on the spot and that of leader Stjepan Radić a few weeks later. On 6 January 1929, King Alexander I got rid of the constitution, banned national political parties, assumed executive power, and renamed the country Yugoslavia. He hoped to curb separatist tendencies and mitigate nationalist passions. He imposed a new constitution and relinquished his dictatorship in 1931. However, Alexander's policies later encountered opposition from other European powers stemming from developments in Italy and Germany, where Nazis rose to power, and the Soviet Union, where Joseph Stalin became absolute ruler. None of these three regimes favored the policy pursued by Alexander I. In fact, Italy and Germany wanted to revise the international treaties signed after World War I, and the Soviets were determined to regain their positions in Europe and pursue a more active international policy.

Alexander attempted to create a centralised Yugoslavia. He decided to abolish Yugoslavia's historic regions, and new internal boundaries were drawn for provinces or banovinas. The banovinas were named after rivers. Many politicians were jailed or kept under police surveillance. During his reign, communist movements were restricted.

The king was assassinated in Marseille during an official visit to France in 1934 by Vlado Chernozemski, an experienced marksman from Ivan Mihailov's Internal Macedonian Revolutionary Organization with the cooperation of the Ustaše, a Croatian fascist revolutionary organisation. Alexander was succeeded by his eleven-year-old son Peter II and a regency council headed by his cousin, Prince Paul.

=== 1934–1941 ===
The international political scene in the late 1930s was marked by growing intolerance between the principal figures, by the aggressive attitude of the totalitarian regimes, and by the certainty that the order set up after World War I was losing its strongholds and its sponsors their strength. Supported and pressured by Fascist Italy and Nazi Germany, Croatian leader Vladko Maček and his party managed the creation of the Banovina of Croatia (Autonomous Region with significant internal self-government) in 1939. The agreement specified that Croatia was to remain part of Yugoslavia, but it was hurriedly building an independent political identity in international relations.

Prince Paul submitted to fascist pressure and signed the Tripartite Pact in Vienna on 25 March 1941, hoping to continue keeping Yugoslavia out of the war. However, this was at the expense of popular support for Paul's regency. Senior military officers were also opposed to the treaty and launched the Yugoslav coup d'état when the king returned on 27 March. Army General Dušan Simović seized power, arrested the Vienna delegation, exiled Prince Paul, and ended the regency, giving 17-year-old King Peter full powers. Hitler then decided to attack Yugoslavia on 6 April 1941, followed immediately by an invasion of Greece where Mussolini had previously been repelled.

== World War II ==
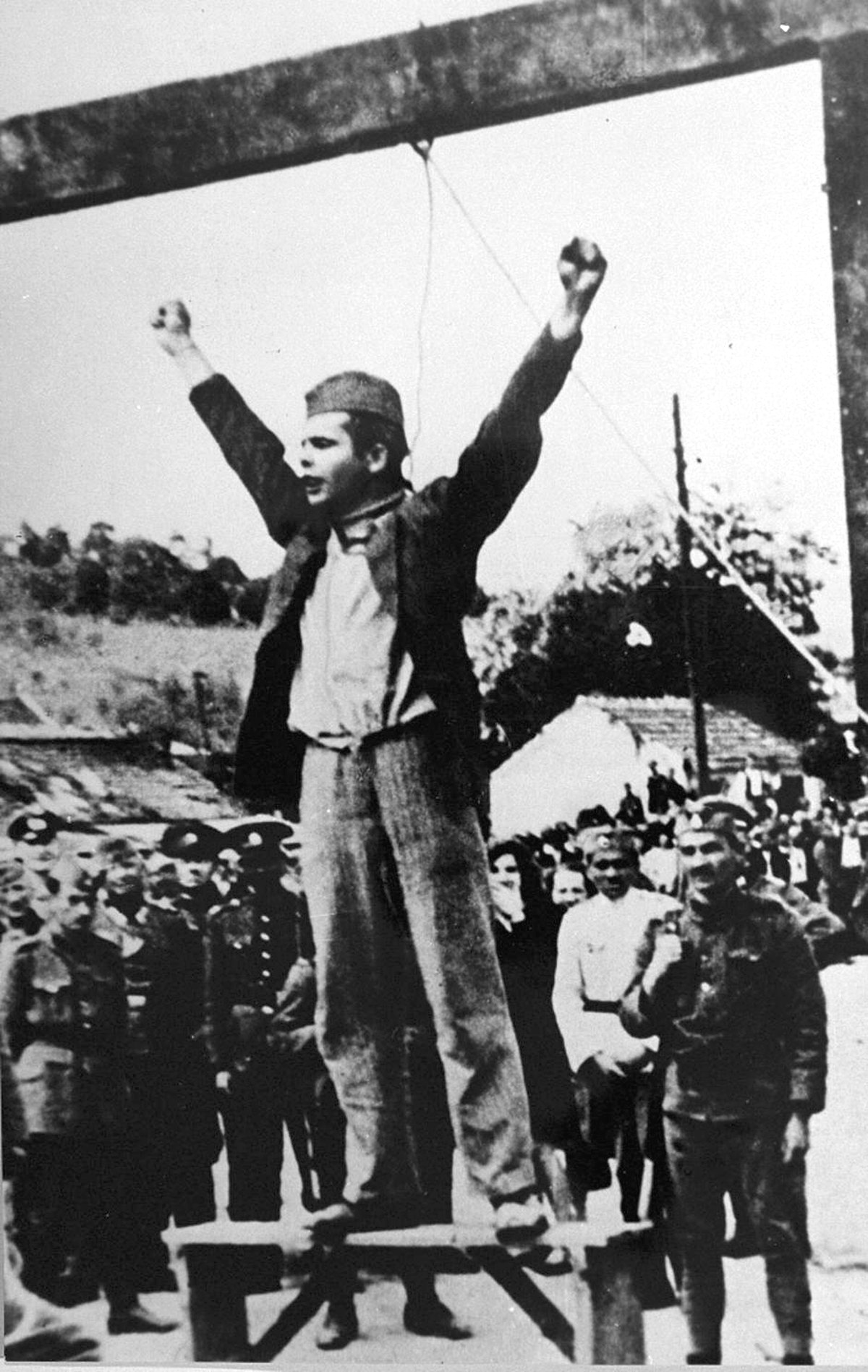
Partisan Stjepan Filipović shouting "Death to fascism, freedom to the people!" shortly before his execution (1942)

At 5:12 a.m. on 6 April 1941, German, Italian and Hungarian forces invaded Yugoslavia. The German Air Force (Luftwaffe) bombed Belgrade and other major Yugoslav cities. On 17 April, representatives of Yugoslavia's various regions signed an armstice with Germany in Belgrade, ending eleven days of resistance against the invading German forces. More than 300,000 Yugoslav officers and soldiers were taken prisoner.

The Axis powers occupied Yugoslavia and split it up. The Independent State of Croatia was established as a Nazi satellite state, ruled by the fascist militia known as the Ustaše that came into existence in 1929, but was relatively limited in its activities until 1941. German troops occupied Bosnia and Herzegovina as well as part of Serbia and Slovenia, while other parts of the country were occupied by Bulgaria, Hungary, and Italy. From 1941 to 1945, the Croatian Ustaše regime persecuted and murdered around 300,000 Serbs, along with at least 30,000 Jews and Roma; hundreds of thousands of Serbs were also expelled and another 200,000-300,000 were forced to convert to Catholicism.

From the start, the Yugoslav resistance forces consisted of two factions: the communist-led Yugoslav Partisans and the royalist Chetniks, with the former receiving Allied recognition at the Tehran conference (1943). The heavily pro-Serbian Chetniks were led by Draža Mihajlović, while the pan-Yugoslav oriented Partisans were led by Josip Broz Tito.

The Partisans initiated a guerrilla campaign that developed into the largest resistance army in occupied Western and Central Europe. The Chetniks were initially supported by the exiled royal government and the Allies, but they soon focused increasingly on combating the Partisans rather than the occupying Axis forces. By the end of the war, the Chetnik movement transformed into a collaborationist Serb nationalist militia completely dependent on Axis supplies. The Chetniks also persecuted and killed Muslims and Croats, with an estimated 50,000-68,000 victims (of which 41,000 were civilians). The highly mobile Partisans, however, carried on their guerrilla warfare with great success. Most notable of the victories against the occupying forces were the battles of Neretva and Sutjeska.

On 25 November 1942, the Anti-Fascist Council of National Liberation of Yugoslavia was convened in Bihać, modern day Bosnia and Herzegovina. The council reconvened on 29 November 1943, in Jajce, also in Bosnia and Herzegovina, and established the basis for post-war organisation of the country, establishing a federation (this date was celebrated as Republic Day after the war).

The Yugoslav Partisans were able to expel the Axis from Serbia in 1944 and the rest of Yugoslavia in 1945. The Red Army provided limited assistance with the liberation of Belgrade and withdrew after the war was over. In May 1945, the Partisans met with Allied forces outside former Yugoslav borders, after also taking over Trieste and parts of the southern Austrian provinces of Styria and Carinthia. However, the Partisans withdrew from Trieste in June of the same year under heavy pressure from Stalin, who did not want a confrontation with the other Allies.

Western attempts to reunite the Partisans, who denied the supremacy of the old government of the Kingdom of Yugoslavia, and the émigrés loyal to the king led to the Tito-Šubašić Agreement in June 1944; however, Marshal Josip Broz Tito was in control and was determined to lead an independent communist state, starting as a prime minister. He had the support of Moscow and London and led by far the strongest Partisan force with 800,000 men.

The official Yugoslav post-war estimate of victims in Yugoslavia during World War II is 1,704,000. Subsequent data gathering in the 1980s by historians Vladimir Žerjavić and Bogoljub Kočović showed that the actual number of dead was about 1 million.

== Federal People's Republic of Yugoslavia ==
On 11 November 1945, parliamentary elections were held with only the Communist-led People's Front appearing on the ballot, securing all 354 seats in the newly formed Constituent Assembly. On 29 November, the Constituent Assembly proclaimed the Federal People's Republic of Yugoslavia, thus abolishing monarchical rule. The elections were called by the regency council (Note: Consisting of constitutional lawyers Srđan Budisavljević, Ante Mandić, and Dušan Sernec, a Serb, a Croat, and a Slovene, respectively.) appointed by the King on 2 March 1945, though whether this represented an abdication is in dispute among historians. Marshal Tito was now in full control, and all opposition elements were eliminated.

The 1946 Constitution of the Federal People's Republic of Yugoslavia, modelled after the Constitution of the Soviet Union, established six republics, an autonomous province, and an autonomous district that were a part of Serbia. The federal capital was Belgrade. The policy focused on a strong central government under the control of the Communist Party, and on recognition of the multiple nationalities. The flags of the republics used versions of the red flag or Slavic tricolor, with a red star in the centre or in the canton.

| Name | Capital | Flag | Emblem | Location |
|---|---|---|---|---|
| Socialist Republic of Bosnia and Herzegovina | Sarajevo | | | |
| Socialist Republic of Croatia | Zagreb | | | |
| Socialist Republic of Macedonia | Skopje | | | |
| Socialist Republic of Montenegro | Titograd | | | |
| Socialist Republic of Serbia | Belgrade | | | |
| Socialist Autonomous Province of Kosovo | Pristina | | | |
| Socialist Autonomous Province of Vojvodina | Novi Sad | | | |
| Socialist Republic of Slovenia | Ljubljana | | | |

Tito's regional goal was to expand south and take control of Albania and parts of Greece. In 1947, negotiations between Yugoslavia and Bulgaria led to the Bled agreement, which proposed to form a close relationship between the two Communist countries, and enabled Yugoslavia to involve itself in the civil war in Greece and use Albania and Bulgaria as bases. Stalin vetoed this agreement and it was never realised. The break between Belgrade and Moscow was now imminent.

Yugoslavia solved the national issue of nations and nationalities (national minorities) in a way that all nations and nationalities had the same rights. However, most of the German minority of Yugoslavia, most of whom had collaborated during the occupation and had been recruited to German forces, were expelled towards Germany or Austria.

=== Yugoslav–Soviet split and the Non-Alignment Movement ===
The country distanced itself from the Soviets in 1948 (cf. Cominform and Informbiro) and started to build its own way to socialism under the political leadership of Josip Broz Tito. Accordingly, the constitution was heavily amended to replace the emphasis on democratic centralism with workers' self-management and decentralization. The Communist Party was renamed to the League of Communists and adopted Titoism at its congress the previous year.

All the Communist European Countries had deferred to Stalin and rejected the Marshall Plan aid in 1947. Tito, at first went along and rejected the Marshall plan. However, in 1948 Tito broke decisively with Stalin on other issues, making Yugoslavia an independent communist state. Yugoslavia requested American aid. American leaders were internally divided, but finally agreed and began sending money on a small scale in 1949, and on a much larger scale 1950–53. The American aid was not part of the Marshall plan.

Tito criticised both Eastern Bloc and NATO nations and, together with India and other countries, started the Non-Aligned Movement in 1961, which remained the official affiliation of the country until it dissolved.

== Socialist Federal Republic of Yugoslavia ==
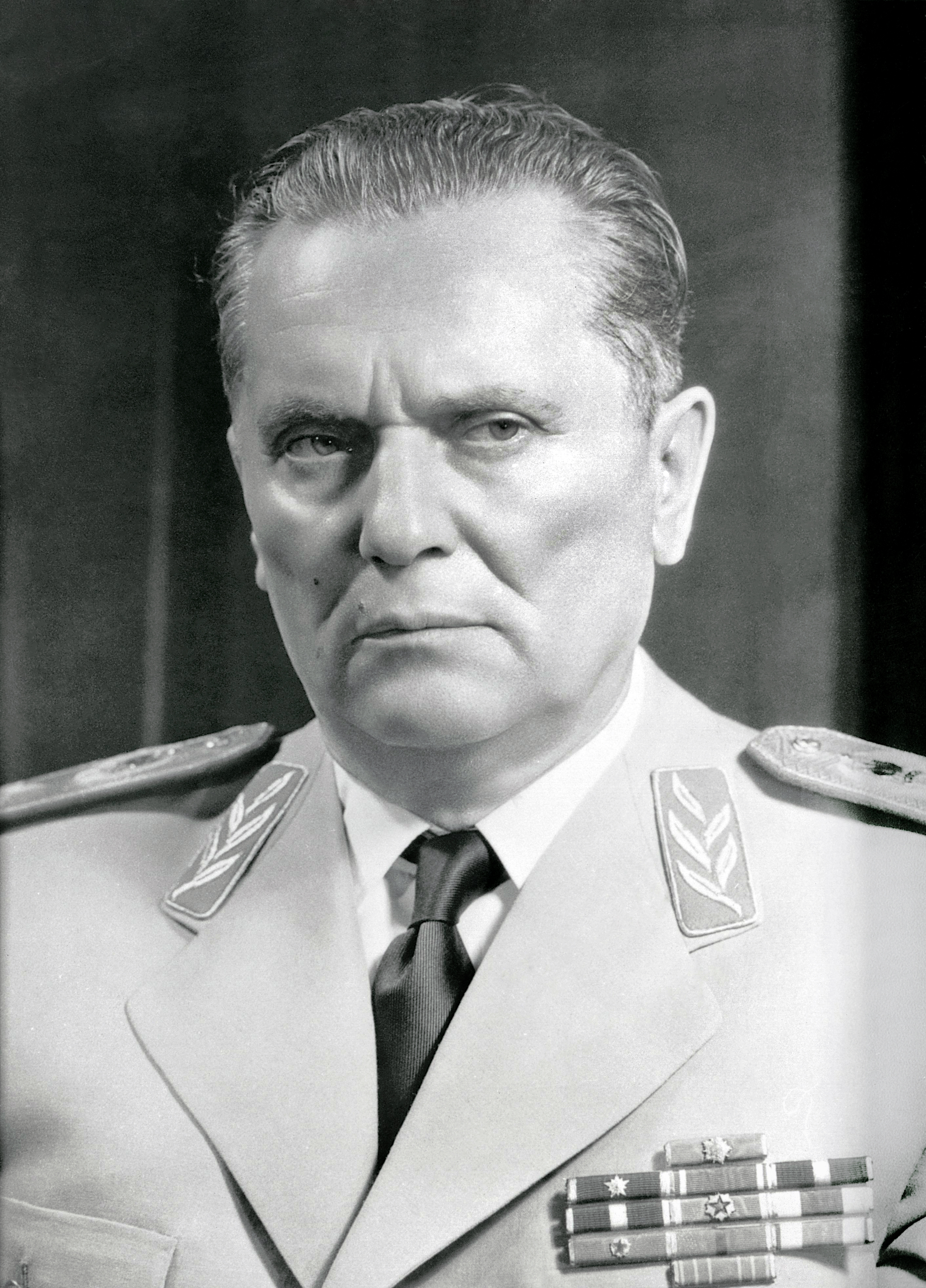
Marshal Josip Broz Tito, the first President of the Federal People's Republic of Yugoslavia.

On 7 April 1963, the nation changed its official name to Socialist Federal Republic of Yugoslavia and, with a new constitution in 1974, Josip Broz Tito was named President for life. In the SFRY, each republic and province had its own constitution, supreme court, parliament, president and prime minister. At the top of the Yugoslav government were the President (Tito), the federal Prime Minister, and the federal Parliament (a collective federal Presidency, formed in 1971, began to operate as head of state after Tito's death in 1980). Also important were the presidents of the League of Communists for each republic and province, and the president of the Central Committee of the League of Communists.

Tito was the most powerful person in the country, followed by republican and provincial premiers and presidents, and League of Communists presidents. Slobodan Penezić Krcun, Tito's chief of secret police in Serbia, fell victim to a dubious traffic incident after he started to complain about Tito's politics. Minister of the interior Aleksandar Ranković lost all of his titles and rights after a major disagreement with Tito regarding state politics. Some influential ministers in government, such as Edvard Kardelj or Stane Dolanc, were more important than the Prime Minister.

First cracks in the tightly governed system surfaced when students in Belgrade and several other cities joined the worldwide protests of 1968. President Josip Broz Tito gradually stopped the protests by giving in to some of the students' demands and saying that "students are right" during a televised speech. However, in the following years, he dealt with the leaders of the protests by sacking them from university and Communist party posts.

Most dissidents during the 1960s and 1970s supported a Marxist humanism.

A more severe sign of disobedience was so-called Croatian Spring of 1970 and 1971, when students in Zagreb organised demonstrations for greater civil liberties and greater Croatian autonomy, followed by mass protests across Croatia. The regime stifled the public protest and incarcerated the leaders, though many key Croatian representatives in the Party silently supported this cause. As a result, a new Constitution was ratified in 1974, which gave more rights to the individual republics in Yugoslavia and provinces in Serbia.

=== Ethnic tensions and economic crisis ===
After the Yugoslav Partisans took over the country at the end of WWII, nationalism was banned from being publicly promoted. Overall relative peace was retained under Tito's rule, though nationalist protests did occur, but these were usually repressed and nationalist leaders were arrested and some were executed by Yugoslav officials. However, the Croatian Spring protests in the 1970s were backed by large numbers of Croats who complained that Yugoslavia remained a Serb hegemony.

Tito, whose home republic was Croatia, was concerned over the stability of the country and responded in a manner to appease both Croats and Serbs: he ordered the arrest of the Croatian Spring protestors while at the same time conceding to some of their demands. Following the 1974 Yugoslav Constitution, Serbia's influence in the country was significantly reduced, while its autonomous provinces of Vojvodina and Kosovo were granted greater autonomy, along with greater rights for the Albanians of Kosovo and Hungarians of Vojvodina. Both provinces were afforded much of the same status as the six republics of Yugoslavia, though they could not secede. Vojvodina and Kosovo formed the provinces of the Republic of Serbia but also formed part of the federation, which led to the unique situation in which Central Serbia did not have its own assembly but a joint assembly with its provinces represented in it. Albanian and Hungarian became nationally recognised minority languages, and the Serbo-Croat of Bosnia and Montenegro altered to a form based on the speech of the local people and not on the standards of Zagreb and Belgrade. In Slovenia the recognized minorities were Hungarians and Italians.

The fact that these autonomous provinces held the same voting power as the republics but unlike other republics could not legally separate from Yugoslavia satisfied Croatia and Slovenia, but in Serbia and in the new autonomous province of Kosovo, reaction was different. Serbs saw the new constitution as conceding to Croat and ethnic Albanian nationalists. Ethnic Albanians in Kosovo saw the creation of an autonomous province as not being enough, and demanded that Kosovo become a constituent republic with the right to separate from Yugoslavia. This created tensions within the Communist leadership, particularly among Communist Serb officials who viewed the 1974 constitution as weakening Serbia's influence and jeopardising the unity of the country by allowing the republics the right to separate.

Several groups of Croats from Herzegovina maintained close ties with the Croatian Ustaše émigrés, aiming to dismantle Yugoslavia and reestablish an independent Croatian state. On 20 June 1972, the Bugojno group attempted to infiltrate SFR Yugoslavia with the aim of inciting a rebellion against the socialist Yugoslav government. Another group, inspired and possibly organized by friar Jozo Križić from Duvno, included soldiers serving their military service in the Yugoslav army. In 1985, they were arrested and imprisoned for attempted terrorism.

According to official statistics, from the 1950s to the early 1980s, Yugoslavia was among the fastest growing countries, approaching the ranges reported in South Korea and other countries undergoing an economic miracle. The unique socialist system in Yugoslavia, where factories were worker cooperatives and decision-making was less centralized than in other socialist countries, may have led to the stronger growth. However, even if the absolute value of the growth rates was not as high as indicated by the official statistics, both the Soviet Union and Yugoslavia were characterized by surprisingly high growth rates of both income and education during the 1950s. The period of European growth ended after the oil price shock in 1970s. Following that, an economic crisis erupted in Yugoslavia due to disastrous economic policies such as borrowing vast amounts of Western capital to fund growth through exports. At the same time, Western economies went into recession, decreasing demand for Yugoslav imports thereby creating a large debt problem.

In 1989, 248 firms were declared bankrupt or were liquidated and 89,400 workers were laid off according to official sources. During the first nine months of 1990 and directly following the adoption of the IMF programme, another 889 enterprises with a combined work-force of 525,000 workers suffered the same fate. In other words, in less than two years "the trigger mechanism" (under the Financial Operations Act) had led to the layoff of more than 600,000 workers out of a total industrial workforce of the order of 2.7 million. An additional 20% of the work force, or half a million people, were not paid wages during the early months of 1990 as enterprises sought to avoid bankruptcy. The largest concentrations of bankrupt firms and lay-offs were in Serbia, Bosnia and Herzegovina, Macedonia and Kosovo. Real earnings were in a free fall and social programmes collapsed; creating within the population an atmosphere of social despair and hopelessness. This was a critical turning point in the events to follow.

== Breakup ==
Breakup of Yugoslavia

After Tito's death on 4 May 1980, ethnic tensions grew in Yugoslavia. The legacy of the Constitution of 1974 threw the system of decision-making into a state of paralysis, made all the more hopeless as the conflict of interests became irreconcilable. The Albanian majority in Kosovo demanded the status of a republic in the 1981 protests in Kosovo while Serbian authorities suppressed this sentiment and proceeded to reduce the province's autonomy.

In 1986, the Serbian Academy of Sciences and Arts drafted a memorandum addressing some burning issues concerning the position of Serbs as the most numerous people in Yugoslavia. The largest Yugoslav republic in territory and population, Serbia's influence over the regions of Kosovo and Vojvodina was reduced by the 1974 Constitution. Because its two autonomous provinces had de facto prerogatives of full-fledged republics, Serbia found that its hands were tied, for the republican government was restricted in making and carrying out decisions that would apply to the provinces. Since the provinces had a vote in the Federal Presidency Council (an eight-member council composed of representatives from the six republics and the two autonomous provinces), they sometimes even entered into coalitions with other republics, thus outvoting Serbia. Serbia's political impotence made it possible for others to exert pressure on the 2 million Serbs (20% of the total Serbian population) living outside Serbia.

After Tito's death, Serbian communist leader Slobodan Milošević began making his way toward the pinnacle of Serbian leadership. Milošević sought to restore pre-1974 Serbian sovereignty. Other republics, especially Slovenia and Croatia, denounced his proposal as a revival of greater Serbian hegemonism. Through a series of moves known as the "anti-bureaucratic revolution", Milošević succeeded in reducing the autonomy of Vojvodina and of Kosovo and Metohija, but both entities retained a vote in the Yugoslav Presidency Council. The very instrument that reduced Serbian influence before was now used to increase it: in the eight-member Council, Serbia could now count on four votes at a minimum: Serbia proper, then-loyal Montenegro, Vojvodina, and Kosovo.

As a result of these events, ethnic Albanian miners in Kosovo organised the 1989 Kosovo miners' strike, which dovetailed into an ethnic conflict between the Albanians and the non-Albanians in the province. At around 80% of the population of Kosovo in the 1980s, ethnic-Albanians were the majority. With Milošević gaining control over Kosovo in 1989, the original residency changed drastically leaving only a minimum number of Serbians in the region. The number of Serbs in Kosovo was quickly declining for several reasons, among them the ever-increasing ethnic tensions and subsequent emigration from the area.

Meanwhile, Slovenia, under the presidency of Milan Kučan, and Croatia supported the Albanian miners and their struggle for formal recognition. Initial strikes turned into widespread demonstrations demanding a Kosovar republic. This angered Serbia's leadership which proceeded to use police force and later, federal police troops to restore civil order.

In January 1990, the extraordinary 14th Congress of the League of Communists of Yugoslavia was convened, where the Serbian and Slovenian delegations argued over the future of the League of Communists and Yugoslavia. The Serbian delegation, led by Milošević, insisted on a policy of "one person, one vote" which would empower the plurality population, the Serbs. In turn, the Slovenian delegation, supported by Croats, sought to reform Yugoslavia by devolving even more power to republics, but were voted down. As a result, the Slovene and Croatian delegations left the Congress and the all-Yugoslav Communist party was dissolved.

The constitutional crisis that inevitably followed resulted in a rise of nationalism in all republics: Slovenia and Croatia voiced demands for looser ties within the federation. Following the fall of communism in Eastern Europe, each of the republics held multi-party elections in 1990. Slovenia and Croatia held the elections in April since their communist parties chose to cede power peacefully. Other Yugoslav republics—especially Serbia—were more or less dissatisfied with the democratisation in two of the republics and proposed different sanctions (e.g. Serbian "customs tax" for Slovene products) against the two, but as the year progressed, other republics' communist parties saw the inevitability of the democratisation process. In December, as the last member of the federation, Serbia held parliamentary elections confirming the rule of former communists in the republic.

Slovenia and Croatia elected governments oriented towards greater autonomy of the republics (under Lojze Peterle and Franjo Tuđman, respectively). Serbia and Montenegro elected candidates who favoured Yugoslav unity. The Croat quest for independence led to large Serb communities within Croatia rebelling and trying to secede from the Croat republic. Serbs in Croatia would not accept the status of a national minority in a sovereign Croatia since they would be demoted from the status of a constituent nation.

=== Yugoslav Wars ===
The war broke out when the new regimes tried to replace Yugoslav civilian and military forces with secessionist forces. When, in August 1990, Croatia attempted to replace police in the Serb-populated Croat Krajina by force, the population first looked for refuge in the Yugoslav Army barracks, while the army remained passive. The civilians then organised armed resistance. These armed conflicts between the Croatian armed forces ("police") and civilians mark the beginning of the Yugoslav war that inflamed the region. Similarly, the attempt to replace Yugoslav frontier police by Slovene police forces provoked regional armed conflicts which ended with a minimal number of victims.

A similar attempt in Bosnia and Herzegovina led to a war that lasted more than three years. The results of all these conflicts were the almost total emigration of the Serbs from all three regions, the massive displacement of the populations in Bosnia and Herzegovina, and the establishment of the three new independent states. The separation of Macedonia was mostly peaceful. Tomasz Kamusella argues that Serbian leaders expected they could engage in practices of ethnic cleansing with impunity, given that no international reaction had occurred in 1989 when communist Bulgaria had expelled 360,000 of its Turks and Muslims.

Serbian uprisings in Croatia began in August 1990 by blocking roads leading from the Dalmatian coast towards the interior almost a year before Croatian leadership made any move towards independence. These uprisings were more or less discreetly backed by the Serb-dominated federal army (JNA). The Serbs in Croatia proclaimed "Serb autonomous areas", which were later united into the Republic of Serb Krajina. The federal army tried to disarm the territorial defence forces of Slovenia (the republics had their local defence forces similar to the Home Guard) in 1990 but was not completely successful. Still, Slovenia began to covertly import arms to replenish its armed forces.

Croatia also embarked upon the illegal importation of arms, (following the disarmament of the republics' armed forces by the federal army) mainly from Hungary. These activities were under constant surveillance and produced a video of a secret meeting between the Croatian Defence minister Martin Špegelj and two unidentified men. The video, filmed by the Yugoslav counter-intelligence (KOS, Kontra-obavještajna služba), showed Špegel announcing that they were at war with the army and giving instructions about arms smuggling as well as methods of dealing with the Yugoslav Army's officers stationed in Croatian cities. Serbia and JNA used this discovery of Croatian rearmament for propaganda purposes. Guns were also fired from army bases through Croatia. Elsewhere, tensions were running high. In the same month, the Army leaders met with the Presidency of Yugoslavia in an attempt to get them to declare a state of emergency which would allow for the army to take control of the country. The army was seen as an arm of the Serbian government by that time so the consequence feared by the other republics was to be total Serbian domination of the union. The representatives of Serbia, Montenegro, Kosovo, and Vojvodina voted for the decision, while all other republics, Croatia, Slovenia, Macedonia and Bosnia and Herzegovina, voted against. The tie delayed an escalation of conflicts, but not for long.

Following the first multi-party election results, in the autumn of 1990, the republics of Slovenia and Croatia proposed transforming Yugoslavia into a loose confederation of six republics. By this proposal, republics would have right to self-determination. However Milošević rejected all such proposals, arguing that like Slovenes and Croats, the Serbs (having in mind Croatian Serbs) should also have a right to self-determination.

On 9 March 1991, demonstrations were held against Slobodan Milošević in Belgrade, but the police and the military were deployed in the streets to restore order, killing two people. In late March 1991, the Plitvice Lakes incident was one of the first sparks of open war in Croatia. The Yugoslav People's Army (JNA), whose superior officers were mainly of Serbian ethnicity, maintained an impression of being neutral, but as time went on, they became increasingly more involved in state politics.

On 25 June 1991, Slovenia and Croatia became the first republics to declare independence from Yugoslavia. The federal customs officers in Slovenia on the border crossings with Italy, Austria, and Hungary simply changed uniforms since most of them were local Slovenes. The following day (26 June), the Federal Executive Council specifically ordered the army to take control of the "internationally recognized borders", leading to the Ten-Day War. As Slovenia and Croatia fought towards independence, the Serbian and Croatian forces indulged in violent and perilous rivalry.

The Yugoslav People's Army forces, based in barracks in Slovenia and Croatia, attempted to carry out the task within the next 48 hours. However, because of misinformation given to the Yugoslav Army conscripts that the Federation was under attack by foreign forces and the fact that the majority of them did not wish to engage in a war on the ground where they served their conscription, the Slovene territorial defence forces retook most of the posts within days with minimal loss of life on both sides. A ceasefire was eventually agreed upon. According to the Brioni Agreement, recognised by representatives of all republics, the international community pressured Slovenia and Croatia to place a three-month moratorium on their independence.

During these three months, the Yugoslav Army completed its pull-out from Slovenia, but in Croatia, a bloody war broke out in the autumn of 1991. Ethnic Serbs, who had created their own state Republic of Serbian Krajina in heavily Serb-populated regions resisted the police forces of the Republic of Croatia who were trying to bring that breakaway region back under Croatian jurisdiction. In some strategic places, the Yugoslav Army acted as a buffer zone; in most others it was protecting or aiding Serbs with resources and even manpower in their confrontation with the new Croatian army and their police force.

In September 1991, the Republic of Macedonia also declared independence, becoming the only former republic to gain sovereignty without resistance from the Belgrade-based Yugoslav authorities. 500 US soldiers were then deployed under the UN banner to monitor Macedonia's northern borders with the Republic of Serbia. Macedonia's first president, Kiro Gligorov, maintained good relations with Belgrade and the other breakaway republics.

As a result of the conflict, the United Nations Security Council unanimously adopted UN Security Council Resolution 721 on 27 November 1991, which paved the way to the establishment of peacekeeping operations in Yugoslavia.

In the fall of 1991, the Bosnian Muslim Party of Democratic Action (SDA) and the Croatian Democratic Union of Bosnia and Herzegovina party groups in the Bosnian parliament drafted a resolution for independence, causing a walkout among the Bosnian Serb representatives. As a result, the republic's institutions and organizations split into ethnic lines. The Serb Democratic Party (SDS) organised the creation of "Serb Autonomous Regions" in Bosnia where Serbs formed the majority. Similar steps were taken by the Bosnian Croats.

A Bosnian Serb referendum that asked citizens whether they wanted to remain within Yugoslavia was held on 9 and 10 November 1991, passing in favor of staying within a common state. The parliamentary government of Bosnia and Herzegovina (with a clear Bosniak and Croat majority) asserted that this plebiscite was illegal, but the Bosnian Serb assembly acknowledged its results. On 21 November 1991, the Assembly proclaimed that all those municipalities, local communities, and populated places in which over 50% of the people of Serbian nationality had voted in favor of remaining in a joint Yugoslav state, would be territory of the federal Yugoslav state. On 9 January 1992, the Bosnian Serbs proclaimed the "Republic of the Serbian People in Bosnia-Herzegovina". From 29 February-1 March 1992, a European Community-backed Bosnian referendum was held in which 99.7 percent voted for independence. The turnout was only 63.4 percent, as it was boycotted by most Bosnian Serbs. The republic's government declared its independence on 5 April. The war in Bosnia followed shortly thereafter.

=== Timeline ===
Various dates are considered the end of the Socialist Federal Republic of Yugoslavia:

- 25 June 1991: Croatia and Slovenia declared independence
- 8 September 1991: following a referendum, the Republic of Macedonia declared independence which was ratified by the Assembly of Macedonia on 17 September
- 8 October 1991: 9 July moratorium on Slovene and Croatian secession ended and Croatia restated its independence in the Croatian Parliament (that day is officially considered the date of Independence)
- 6 April 1992: full recognition of Bosnia and Herzegovina's independence by the European Union followed by the U.S.
- 27 April 1992: the Federal Republic of Yugoslavia is formed
- 14 December 1995: the Dayton Agreement is signed by the leaders of FR Yugoslavia, Bosnia and Herzegovina, and Croatia

== New states ==
=== Succession, 1992–2003 ===
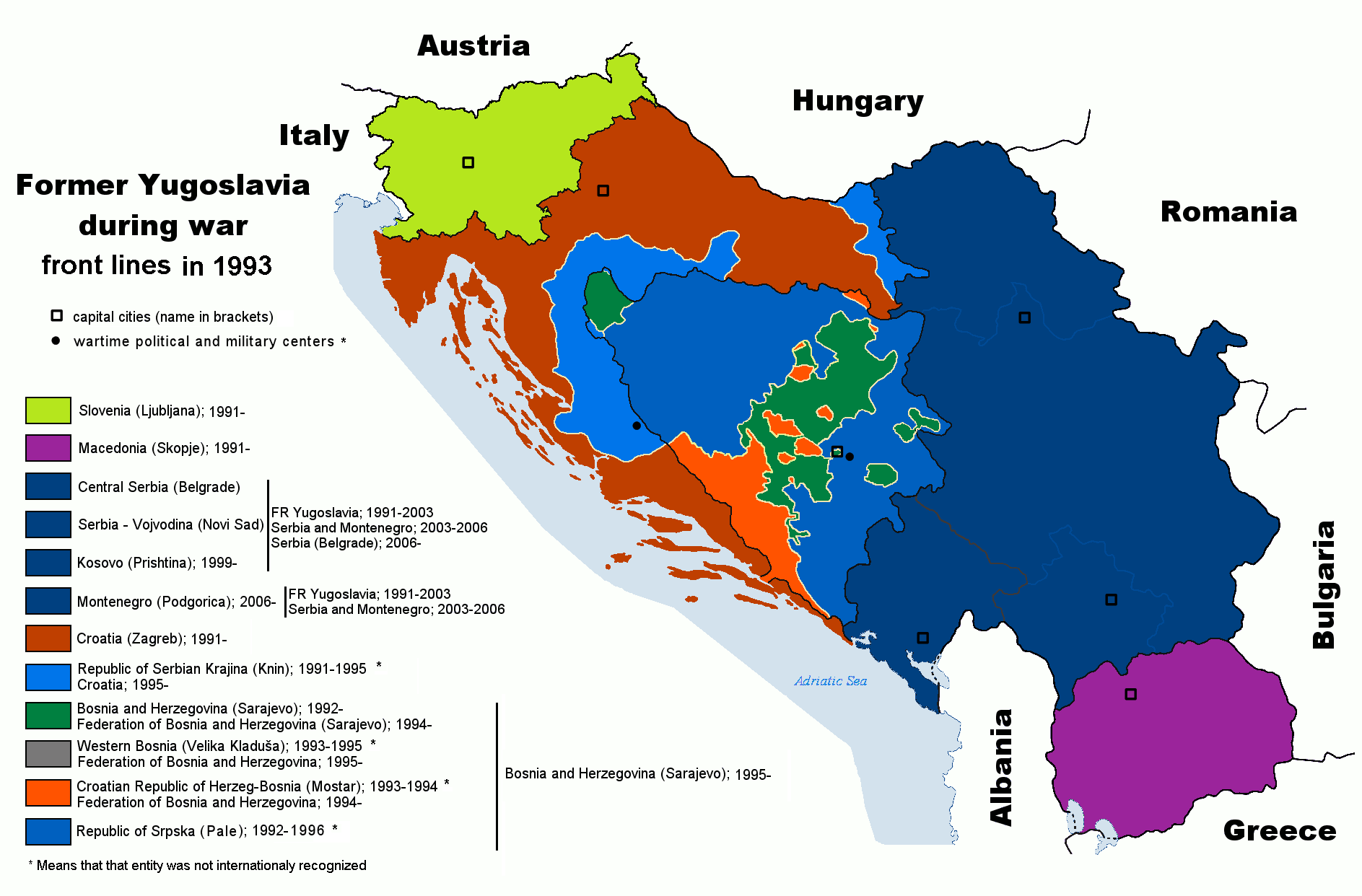
Yugoslavia at the time of its dissolution, early 1992

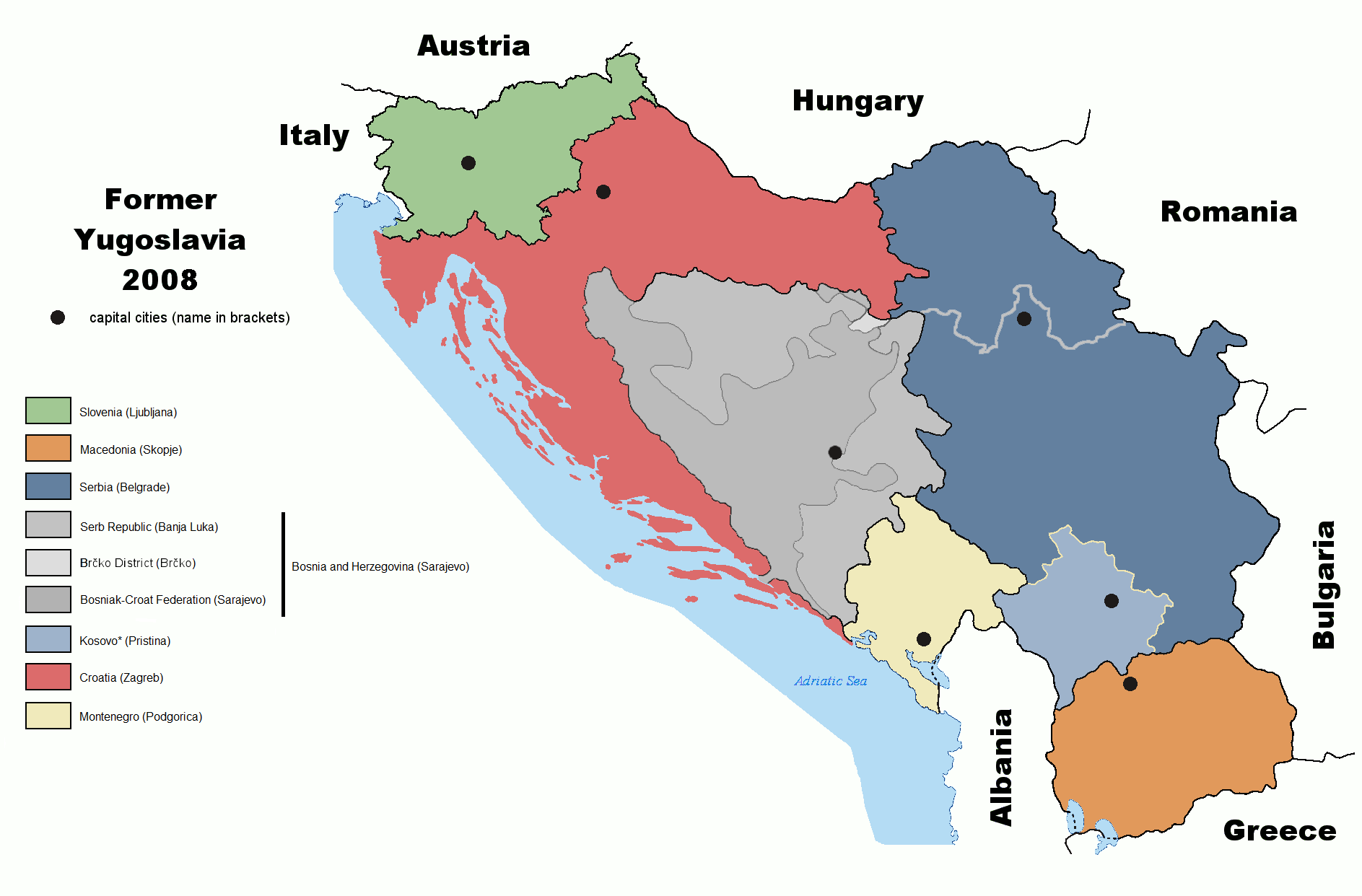
The state of affairs of the territory of the former Yugoslavia, 2008

As the Yugoslav Wars raged through Bosnia and Croatia, the republics of Serbia and Montenegro, which remained relatively untouched by the war, formed a rump state known as the Federal Republic of Yugoslavia (FRY) in 1992. The Federal Republic of Yugoslavia aspired to be a sole legal successor to the Socialist Federal Republic of Yugoslavia, but those claims were opposed by the other former republics. The United Nations also denied its request to automatically continue the membership of the former state. In 2000, Milošević was prosecuted for atrocities committed in his ten-year rule in Serbia and the Yugoslav Wars. Eventually, after the overthrow of Slobodan Milošević from power as president of the federation in 2000, the country dropped those aspirations, accepted the opinion of the Badinter Arbitration Committee about shared succession, and reapplied for and gained UN membership on 2 November 2000. From 1992 to 2000, some countries, including the United States, had referred to the FRY as Serbia and Montenegro as they viewed its claim to Yugoslavia's successorship as illegitimate. In April 2001, the five successor states extant at the time drafted an Agreement on Succession Issues of the Former Socialist Federal Republic of Yugoslavia. Marking an important transition in its history, the Federal Republic of Yugoslavia was officially renamed Serbia and Montenegro in 2003.

According to the Succession Agreement signed in Vienna on 29 June 2001, all assets of former Yugoslavia were divided between five successor states:

| Name | Capital | Flag | Coat of arms | Declared date of independence | United Nations membership |
|---|---|---|---|---|---|
| Federal Republic of Yugoslavia (Note: Later renamed to Serbia and Montenegro in 2003.) | Belgrade | | | 27 April 1992 (Note: Date of the proclamation of the FR of Yugoslavia.) | 1 November 2000 (Note: Membership succeeded by Serbia on 3 June 2006.) |
| Republic of Bosnia and Herzegovina | Sarajevo | | | 3 March 1992 | 22 May 1992 |
| Republic of Croatia | Zagreb | | | 25 June 1991 | 22 May 1992 |
| Republic of Macedonia (Note: Name changed to the Republic of North Macedonia in 2019 as a result of the Prespa Agreement.) | Skopje | | | 8 September 1991 | 8 April 1993 |
| Republic of Slovenia | Ljubljana | | | 25 June 1991 | 22 May 1992 |

=== Succession, 2006–present ===
In June 2006, Montenegro became an independent nation after the results of a May 2006 referendum, therefore rendering Serbia and Montenegro no longer existent. After Montenegro's independence, Serbia became the legal successor of Serbia and Montenegro, while Montenegro re-applied for membership in international organisations. In February 2008, the Republic of Kosovo declared independence from Serbia, leading to an ongoing dispute on whether Kosovo is a legally recognised state. Republic of Kosovo is not a member of the United Nations, but a number of states, including the United States and various members of the European Union, have recognised Republic of Kosovo as a sovereign state.

| | Bosnia and Herzegovina | Croatia | Kosovo | Montenegro | North Macedonia | Serbia | Slovenia |
|---|---|---|---|---|---|---|---|
| Flag | (Bosnia and Herzegovina) | (Croatia) | (Kosovo) | (Montenegro) | (North Macedonia) | (Serbia) | (Slovenia) |
| Coat of arms | Bosnia and Herzegovina | | Kosovo | | | | Slovenia |
| Capital | Sarajevo | Zagreb | Pristina | Podgorica | Skopje | Belgrade | Ljubljana |
| Independence | 3 March, 1992 | 25 June, 1991 | 17 February, 2008 | 3 June, 2006 | 8 September, 1991 | 5 June, 2006 | 25 June, 1991 |
| Population (2018) | 3,301,779 | 4,109,669 | 1,886,259 | 622,359 | 2,068,979 | 6,988,221 | 2,086,525 |
| Area | 51,197 km^{2} | 56,594 km^{2} | 10,908 km^{2} | 13,812 km^{2} | 25,713 km^{2} | 88,361 km^{2} | 20,273 km^{2} |
| Density | 69/km^{2} | 74/km^{2} | 159/km^{2} | 45/km^{2} | 81/km^{2} | 91/km^{2} | 102/km^{2} |
| Water area (%) | 0.02% | 1.1% | 1.00% | 2.61% | 1.09% | 0.13% | 0.6% |
| GDP (nominal) total (2023) | $24.531 billion | $73.490 billion | $9.815 billion | $6.674 billion | $15.024 billion | $68.679 billion | $65.202 billion |
| GDP (PPP) per capita (2023) | $18,956 | $40,484 | $15,398 | $27,616 | $21,103 | $25,718 | $52,517 |
| Gini Index (2018) | 33.0 | 29.7 | 23.2 | 33.2 | 43.2 | 29.7 | 25.6 |
| HDI (2023) | 0.804 (Very High) | 0.889 (Very High) | 0.762 (High) | 0.862 (Very High) | 0.815 (Very High) | 0.833 (Very High) | 0.931 (Very High) |
| Currency | Convertible mark | Euro | Euro | Euro | Macedonian denar | Serbian dinar | Euro |
| Internet TLD | .ba | .hr | .xk | .me | .mk | .rs | .si |
| Calling code | +387 | +385 | +383 | +382 | +389 | +381 | +386 |

=== Yugo-nostalgia ===
Remembrance of the time of the joint state and its positive attributes is referred to as Yugo-nostalgia. Many aspects of Yugo-nostalgia refer to the socialist system and the sense of social security it provided. There are still people from the former Yugoslavia who self-identify as Yugoslavs; this identifier is commonly seen in demographics relating to ethnicity in today's independent states.

== Demographics ==
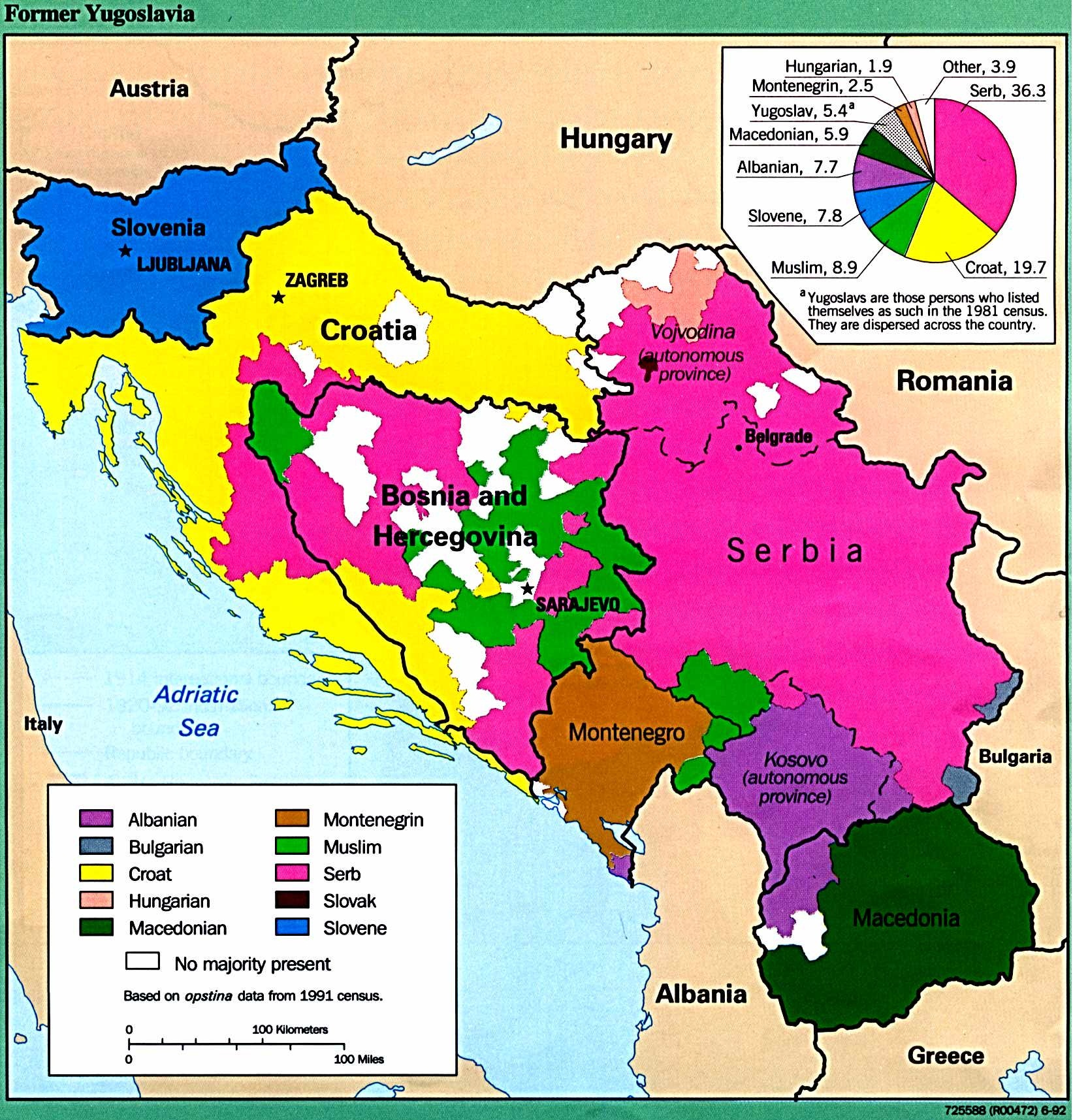
Ethnic map of Yugoslavia based on 1991 census data, published by the CIA in 1992

Yugoslavia had always been a home to a very diverse population, not only in terms of national affiliation, but also religious affiliation. Roman Catholicism, Eastern Orthodoxy, Islam, Judaism, and Protestantism were faiths practiced in the country. The religious demography of Yugoslavia changed significantly after World War II. A census taken in 1921 and later in 1948 found that 99% of the population appeared to be deeply involved with their religion and practices. With postwar government programs of modernisation and urbanisation, the proportion of religious believers declined dramatically. Connections between religious belief and nationality posed a serious threat to the post-war Communist government's policies on national unity and state structure. Although Yugoslavia became a de facto atheist state, in contrast to other socialist states of the time, the Catholic Church maintained an active role in society of Yugoslavia, the Holy See normalized its relations with Yugoslavia by 1967 and worked together on stopping the Vietnam War. Likewise, the Serbian Orthodox Church received favorable treatment, and Yugoslavia did not engage in anti-religious campaigns to the extent of other countries in the Eastern Bloc.

After the rise of communism, a survey taken in 1964 showed that just over 70% of the total population of Yugoslavia considered themselves to be religious believers. The places of highest religious concentration were that of Kosovo with 91% and Bosnia and Herzegovina with 83.8%. The places of lowest religious concentration were Slovenia 65.4%, Serbia with 63.7% and Croatia with 63.6%. The percentage of self-declared atheists was highest among Yugoslavs by nationality at 45%, followed by Serbs at 42%. Religious differences between Orthodox Serbs and Macedonians, Catholic Croats and Slovenes, and Muslim Bosniaks and Albanians alongside the rise of nationalism contributed to the collapse of Yugoslavia in 1991.

The Kingdom of Yugoslavia had unitary policies, suppressed autonomy and proclaimed the official ideology to be that Serbs, Croats, Bosniaks, Montenegrins, Macedonians and Slovenes were tribes of one nation of Yugoslavs (see Yugoslavism), to the heavy disagreement and resistance from Croats and other ethnic groups; this was interpreted as gradual Serbianization of Yugoslavia's non-Serb population. The ruling Communist Party of the Socialist Federal Republic of Yugoslavia was ideologically opposed to ethnic unitarism and royal hegemony, and instead promoted ethnic diversity and social Yugoslavism within the notion of "brotherhood and unity", while organizing the country as a federation.

=== Languages ===
The three major languages in Yugoslavia were Serbo-Croatian, Slovenian, and Macedonian. Serbo-Croatian, the only language taught all across former Yugoslavia, remained the second language of many Slovenes and Macedonians, especially those born during the time of Yugoslavia. After the breakup of Yugoslavia, Serbo-Croatian has lost its unitary codification and its official unitary status and has since diverged into four standardized varieties of what remains one pluricentric language: Bosnian, Croatian, Montenegrin and Serbian.

== See also ==
- History of the Balkans

== Notes ==
| Region | until 1918 | 1918– 1929 | 1929– 1945 | 1941– 1945 | 1945– 1946 | 1946– 1963 | 1963– 1992 | 1992– 2003 | 2003– 2006 | 2006– 2008 | since 2008 |
|---|---|---|---|---|---|---|---|---|---|---|---|
| Slovenia | Part of Austria-Hungary including the Bay of Kotor See also: Kingdom of Croatia-Slavonia (1868–1918) Kingdom of Dalmatia (1815–1918) Condominium of Bosnia and Herzegovina (1878–1918) | State of Slovenes, Croats and Serbs (1918) Kingdom of Serbs, Croats and Slovenes (1918–1929) Kingdom of Yugoslavia (1929–1943) See also: Republic of Prekmurje (1919) Banat, Bačka and Baranja (1918–1919) Free State of Fiume (1920–1924) (1924–1945) Italian province of Zadar (1920–1947) | | Annexed by Italy, Germany, and Hungary^{a} | Democratic Federal Yugoslavia (1943–1945) Federal People's Republic of Yugoslavia (1945–1963) Socialist Federal Republic of Yugoslavia (1963–1992) Consisted of the Socialist Republics of: Slovenia (1945–1991); Croatia (1945–1991); Bosnia and Herzegovina (1945–1992) Serbia (1945–1992) (included the autonomous provinces of Vojvodina and Kosovo) Montenegro (1945–1992); Macedonia (1945–1991) See also: Free Territory of Trieste (1947–1954)^{h} | | | Republic of Slovenia; Ten-Day War | | | |
| Dalmatia | Part of Austria-Hungary including the Bay of Kotor See also: Kingdom of Croatia-Slavonia (1868–1918) Kingdom of Dalmatia (1815–1918) Condominium of Bosnia and Herzegovina (1878–1918) | State of Slovenes, Croats and Serbs (1918) Kingdom of Serbs, Croats and Slovenes (1918–1929) Kingdom of Yugoslavia (1929–1943) See also: Republic of Prekmurje (1919) Banat, Bačka and Baranja (1918–1919) Free State of Fiume (1920–1924) (1924–1945) Italian province of Zadar (1920–1947) | | Independent State of Croatia (1941–1945) Puppet state of Germany. Parts annexed by Italy. Međimurje and Baranja annexed by Hungary. | Democratic Federal Yugoslavia (1943–1945) Federal People's Republic of Yugoslavia (1945–1963) Socialist Federal Republic of Yugoslavia (1963–1992) Consisted of the Socialist Republics of: Slovenia (1945–1991); Croatia (1945–1991); Bosnia and Herzegovina (1945–1992) Serbia (1945–1992) (included the autonomous provinces of Vojvodina and Kosovo) Montenegro (1945–1992); Macedonia (1945–1991) See also: Free Territory of Trieste (1947–1954)^{h} | | | Republic of Croatia^{b} Croatian War of Independence | | | |
| Slavonia | Part of Austria-Hungary including the Bay of Kotor See also: Kingdom of Croatia-Slavonia (1868–1918) Kingdom of Dalmatia (1815–1918) Condominium of Bosnia and Herzegovina (1878–1918) | State of Slovenes, Croats and Serbs (1918) Kingdom of Serbs, Croats and Slovenes (1918–1929) Kingdom of Yugoslavia (1929–1943) See also: Republic of Prekmurje (1919) Banat, Bačka and Baranja (1918–1919) Free State of Fiume (1920–1924) (1924–1945) Italian province of Zadar (1920–1947) | | Independent State of Croatia (1941–1945) Puppet state of Germany. Parts annexed by Italy. Međimurje and Baranja annexed by Hungary. | Democratic Federal Yugoslavia (1943–1945) Federal People's Republic of Yugoslavia (1945–1963) Socialist Federal Republic of Yugoslavia (1963–1992) Consisted of the Socialist Republics of: Slovenia (1945–1991); Croatia (1945–1991); Bosnia and Herzegovina (1945–1992) Serbia (1945–1992) (included the autonomous provinces of Vojvodina and Kosovo) Montenegro (1945–1992); Macedonia (1945–1991) See also: Free Territory of Trieste (1947–1954)^{h} | | | Republic of Croatia^{b} Croatian War of Independence | | | |
| Croatia | Part of Austria-Hungary including the Bay of Kotor See also: Kingdom of Croatia-Slavonia (1868–1918) Kingdom of Dalmatia (1815–1918) Condominium of Bosnia and Herzegovina (1878–1918) | State of Slovenes, Croats and Serbs (1918) Kingdom of Serbs, Croats and Slovenes (1918–1929) Kingdom of Yugoslavia (1929–1943) See also: Republic of Prekmurje (1919) Banat, Bačka and Baranja (1918–1919) Free State of Fiume (1920–1924) (1924–1945) Italian province of Zadar (1920–1947) | | Independent State of Croatia (1941–1945) Puppet state of Germany. Parts annexed by Italy. Međimurje and Baranja annexed by Hungary. | Democratic Federal Yugoslavia (1943–1945) Federal People's Republic of Yugoslavia (1945–1963) Socialist Federal Republic of Yugoslavia (1963–1992) Consisted of the Socialist Republics of: Slovenia (1945–1991); Croatia (1945–1991); Bosnia and Herzegovina (1945–1992) Serbia (1945–1992) (included the autonomous provinces of Vojvodina and Kosovo) Montenegro (1945–1992); Macedonia (1945–1991) See also: Free Territory of Trieste (1947–1954)^{h} | | | Republic of Croatia^{b} Croatian War of Independence | | | |
| Bosnia | Part of Austria-Hungary including the Bay of Kotor See also: Kingdom of Croatia-Slavonia (1868–1918) Kingdom of Dalmatia (1815–1918) Condominium of Bosnia and Herzegovina (1878–1918) | State of Slovenes, Croats and Serbs (1918) Kingdom of Serbs, Croats and Slovenes (1918–1929) Kingdom of Yugoslavia (1929–1943) See also: Republic of Prekmurje (1919) Banat, Bačka and Baranja (1918–1919) Free State of Fiume (1920–1924) (1924–1945) Italian province of Zadar (1920–1947) | | Independent State of Croatia (1941–1945) Puppet state of Germany. Parts annexed by Italy. Međimurje and Baranja annexed by Hungary. | Democratic Federal Yugoslavia (1943–1945) Federal People's Republic of Yugoslavia (1945–1963) Socialist Federal Republic of Yugoslavia (1963–1992) Consisted of the Socialist Republics of: Slovenia (1945–1991); Croatia (1945–1991); Bosnia and Herzegovina (1945–1992) Serbia (1945–1992) (included the autonomous provinces of Vojvodina and Kosovo) Montenegro (1945–1992); Macedonia (1945–1991) See also: Free Territory of Trieste (1947–1954)^{h} | | | Bosnia and Herzegovina^{c} Bosnian War Consists of the Federation of Bosnia and Herzegovina (since 1995), Republika Srpska (since 1995), and Brčko District (since 2000). | | | |
| Herzegovina | Part of Austria-Hungary including the Bay of Kotor See also: Kingdom of Croatia-Slavonia (1868–1918) Kingdom of Dalmatia (1815–1918) Condominium of Bosnia and Herzegovina (1878–1918) | State of Slovenes, Croats and Serbs (1918) Kingdom of Serbs, Croats and Slovenes (1918–1929) Kingdom of Yugoslavia (1929–1943) See also: Republic of Prekmurje (1919) Banat, Bačka and Baranja (1918–1919) Free State of Fiume (1920–1924) (1924–1945) Italian province of Zadar (1920–1947) | | Independent State of Croatia (1941–1945) Puppet state of Germany. Parts annexed by Italy. Međimurje and Baranja annexed by Hungary. | Democratic Federal Yugoslavia (1943–1945) Federal People's Republic of Yugoslavia (1945–1963) Socialist Federal Republic of Yugoslavia (1963–1992) Consisted of the Socialist Republics of: Slovenia (1945–1991); Croatia (1945–1991); Bosnia and Herzegovina (1945–1992) Serbia (1945–1992) (included the autonomous provinces of Vojvodina and Kosovo) Montenegro (1945–1992); Macedonia (1945–1991) See also: Free Territory of Trieste (1947–1954)^{h} | | | Bosnia and Herzegovina^{c} Bosnian War Consists of the Federation of Bosnia and Herzegovina (since 1995), Republika Srpska (since 1995), and Brčko District (since 2000). | | | |
| Vojvodina | Part of the Délvidék region of Hungary | State of Slovenes, Croats and Serbs (1918) Kingdom of Serbs, Croats and Slovenes (1918–1929) Kingdom of Yugoslavia (1929–1943) See also: Republic of Prekmurje (1919) Banat, Bačka and Baranja (1918–1919) Free State of Fiume (1920–1924) (1924–1945) Italian province of Zadar (1920–1947) | | Autonomous Banat^{d} (part of the German; Territory of the Military Commander in Serbia) | Democratic Federal Yugoslavia (1943–1945) Federal People's Republic of Yugoslavia (1945–1963) Socialist Federal Republic of Yugoslavia (1963–1992) Consisted of the Socialist Republics of: Slovenia (1945–1991); Croatia (1945–1991); Bosnia and Herzegovina (1945–1992) Serbia (1945–1992) (included the autonomous provinces of Vojvodina and Kosovo) Montenegro (1945–1992); Macedonia (1945–1991) See also: Free Territory of Trieste (1947–1954)^{h} | | | Federal Republic of Yugoslavia Consisted of the Republic of Serbia (1992–2006) and Republic of Montenegro (1992–2006) Included Kosovo and Metohija, under UN administration, without control since 1999 | State Union of Serbia and Montenegro Included Kosovo, under UN administration | Republic of Serbia Included the autonomous provinces of Vojvodina and Kosovo and Metohija under UN administration | Republic of Serbia Includes the autonomous province of Vojvodina; Kosovo claim |
| Central Serbia | Kingdom of Serbia (1882–1918) | State of Slovenes, Croats and Serbs (1918) Kingdom of Serbs, Croats and Slovenes (1918–1929) Kingdom of Yugoslavia (1929–1943) See also: Republic of Prekmurje (1919) Banat, Bačka and Baranja (1918–1919) Free State of Fiume (1920–1924) (1924–1945) Italian province of Zadar (1920–1947) | | Territory of the Military Commander in Serbia (1941–1944) ^{e} | Democratic Federal Yugoslavia (1943–1945) Federal People's Republic of Yugoslavia (1945–1963) Socialist Federal Republic of Yugoslavia (1963–1992) Consisted of the Socialist Republics of: Slovenia (1945–1991); Croatia (1945–1991); Bosnia and Herzegovina (1945–1992) Serbia (1945–1992) (included the autonomous provinces of Vojvodina and Kosovo) Montenegro (1945–1992); Macedonia (1945–1991) See also: Free Territory of Trieste (1947–1954)^{h} | | | Federal Republic of Yugoslavia Consisted of the Republic of Serbia (1992–2006) and Republic of Montenegro (1992–2006) Included Kosovo and Metohija, under UN administration, without control since 1999 | State Union of Serbia and Montenegro Included Kosovo, under UN administration | Republic of Serbia Included the autonomous provinces of Vojvodina and Kosovo and Metohija under UN administration | Republic of Serbia Includes the autonomous province of Vojvodina; Kosovo claim |
| Kosovo | Part of the Kingdom of Serbia (1912–1918) | State of Slovenes, Croats and Serbs (1918) Kingdom of Serbs, Croats and Slovenes (1918–1929) Kingdom of Yugoslavia (1929–1943) See also: Republic of Prekmurje (1919) Banat, Bačka and Baranja (1918–1919) Free State of Fiume (1920–1924) (1924–1945) Italian province of Zadar (1920–1947) | | Mostly annexed by Italian Albania (1941–1944) along with western Macedonia and south-eastern Montenegro | Democratic Federal Yugoslavia (1943–1945) Federal People's Republic of Yugoslavia (1945–1963) Socialist Federal Republic of Yugoslavia (1963–1992) Consisted of the Socialist Republics of: Slovenia (1945–1991); Croatia (1945–1991); Bosnia and Herzegovina (1945–1992) Serbia (1945–1992) (included the autonomous provinces of Vojvodina and Kosovo) Montenegro (1945–1992); Macedonia (1945–1991) See also: Free Territory of Trieste (1947–1954)^{h} | | | Federal Republic of Yugoslavia Consisted of the Republic of Serbia (1992–2006) and Republic of Montenegro (1992–2006) Included Kosovo and Metohija, under UN administration, without control since 1999 | State Union of Serbia and Montenegro Included Kosovo, under UN administration | Republic of Serbia Included the autonomous provinces of Vojvodina and Kosovo and Metohija under UN administration | Republic of Kosovo |
| Metohija | Kingdom of Montenegro (1910–1918) Metohija controlled by Austria-Hungary 1915–1918 | State of Slovenes, Croats and Serbs (1918) Kingdom of Serbs, Croats and Slovenes (1918–1929) Kingdom of Yugoslavia (1929–1943) See also: Republic of Prekmurje (1919) Banat, Bačka and Baranja (1918–1919) Free State of Fiume (1920–1924) (1924–1945) Italian province of Zadar (1920–1947) | | Mostly annexed by Italian Albania (1941–1944) along with western Macedonia and south-eastern Montenegro | Democratic Federal Yugoslavia (1943–1945) Federal People's Republic of Yugoslavia (1945–1963) Socialist Federal Republic of Yugoslavia (1963–1992) Consisted of the Socialist Republics of: Slovenia (1945–1991); Croatia (1945–1991); Bosnia and Herzegovina (1945–1992) Serbia (1945–1992) (included the autonomous provinces of Vojvodina and Kosovo) Montenegro (1945–1992); Macedonia (1945–1991) See also: Free Territory of Trieste (1947–1954)^{h} | | | Federal Republic of Yugoslavia Consisted of the Republic of Serbia (1992–2006) and Republic of Montenegro (1992–2006) Included Kosovo and Metohija, under UN administration, without control since 1999 | State Union of Serbia and Montenegro Included Kosovo, under UN administration | Republic of Serbia Included the autonomous provinces of Vojvodina and Kosovo and Metohija under UN administration | Republic of Kosovo |
| Montenegro and Brda | Kingdom of Montenegro (1910–1918) Metohija controlled by Austria-Hungary 1915–1918 | State of Slovenes, Croats and Serbs (1918) Kingdom of Serbs, Croats and Slovenes (1918–1929) Kingdom of Yugoslavia (1929–1943) See also: Republic of Prekmurje (1919) Banat, Bačka and Baranja (1918–1919) Free State of Fiume (1920–1924) (1924–1945) Italian province of Zadar (1920–1947) | | Protectorate of Montenegro^{f} (1941–1944) | Democratic Federal Yugoslavia (1943–1945) Federal People's Republic of Yugoslavia (1945–1963) Socialist Federal Republic of Yugoslavia (1963–1992) Consisted of the Socialist Republics of: Slovenia (1945–1991); Croatia (1945–1991); Bosnia and Herzegovina (1945–1992) Serbia (1945–1992) (included the autonomous provinces of Vojvodina and Kosovo) Montenegro (1945–1992); Macedonia (1945–1991) See also: Free Territory of Trieste (1947–1954)^{h} | | | Federal Republic of Yugoslavia Consisted of the Republic of Serbia (1992–2006) and Republic of Montenegro (1992–2006) Included Kosovo and Metohija, under UN administration, without control since 1999 | State Union of Serbia and Montenegro Included Kosovo, under UN administration | Montenegro | |
| Vardar Macedonia | Part of the Kingdom of Serbia (1912–1918) | State of Slovenes, Croats and Serbs (1918) Kingdom of Serbs, Croats and Slovenes (1918–1929) Kingdom of Yugoslavia (1929–1943) See also: Republic of Prekmurje (1919) Banat, Bačka and Baranja (1918–1919) Free State of Fiume (1920–1924) (1924–1945) Italian province of Zadar (1920–1947) | | Annexed by the Kingdom of Bulgaria (1941–1944) | Democratic Federal Yugoslavia (1943–1945) Federal People's Republic of Yugoslavia (1945–1963) Socialist Federal Republic of Yugoslavia (1963–1992) Consisted of the Socialist Republics of: Slovenia (1945–1991); Croatia (1945–1991); Bosnia and Herzegovina (1945–1992) Serbia (1945–1992) (included the autonomous provinces of Vojvodina and Kosovo) Montenegro (1945–1992); Macedonia (1945–1991) See also: Free Territory of Trieste (1947–1954)^{h} | | | Republic of North Macedonia^{g} | | | |
^{a} Prekmurje annexed by Hungary.; ^{b} See also: SAO Kninska Krajina (1990) → SAO Krajina (1990–1991); and SAO Eastern Slavonia, Baranja and Western Syrmia (1990–1991), SAO Western Slavonia (1990–1991) and the Republic of Serbian Krajina (1990–1995), all replaced by the UN Transitional Administration for Eastern Slavonia, Baranja and Western Sirmium (1996–1998).; ^{c} See also: Republic of Bosnia and Herzegovina; Croatian Republic of Herzeg-Bosnia; and the Serbian Autonomous Oblasts (SAOs) of Bosanska Krajina, North-East Bosnia, Romanija and Herzegovina (1991–1992), which all combined to form the Serbian Republic of Bosnia and Herzegovina (1992–1995).; ^{d} Bačka was reannexed by Hungary (1941–1944), while Syrmia was annexed by the Independent State of Croatia (1941–1944).; ^{e} Including North Kosovo. See also: Republic of Užice.; ^{f} Annexed by Italy (1941–1943) and Germany (1943–1944). Smaller part annexed by the Independent State of Croatia (1941–1944).; ^{g} North Macedonia's official and constitutional name was the Republic of Macedonia until 2019. It was known in the United Nations as the former Yugoslav Republic of Macedonia because of a naming dispute with Greece.; ^{h} Free Territory was established in 1947. Its administration was divided into two areas (Zone A) and (Zone B). Free Territory was de facto taken over by Italy and SFRY in 1954.
