= Legislative assemblies of SFR Yugoslavia =

This is a list of the legislative assemblies of the Socialist Federal Republic of Yugoslavia.

== Table of legislative assemblies by history and by jurisdiction ==
Jurisdiction	Period	Combined legislature	Constituent legislatures (number of legislators in parentheses)
General legislature for Yugoslavia
Federative People's Republic of Yugoslavia	1946-1953	National Assembly	Federal Council
Federative People's Republic of Yugoslavia	1946-1953	National Assembly	Council of Peoples
Federative People's Republic of Yugoslavia	1953-1963	Federal People's Assembly	Federal Council
Federative People's Republic of Yugoslavia	1953-1963	Federal People's Assembly	Council of Producers
Socialist Federal Republic of Yugoslavia	1963-1974	Federal Assembly	Federal Council (120)
Socialist Federal Republic of Yugoslavia	1963-1974	Federal Assembly	Economic Council (120)
Socialist Federal Republic of Yugoslavia	1963-1974	Federal Assembly	Social-Health Council (120)
Socialist Federal Republic of Yugoslavia	1963-1974	Federal Assembly	Educational-Cultural Council (120)
Socialist Federal Republic of Yugoslavia	1963-1974	Federal Assembly	Organization-Political Council (120)
Socialist Federal Republic of Yugoslavia	1968-1974	Federal Assembly	Council of Peoples (140)
Socialist Federal Republic of Yugoslavia	1974-1992	Assembly	Federal Council (220)
Socialist Federal Republic of Yugoslavia	1974-1992	Assembly	Council of Republics and Regions (88)
Legislatures of republics
Socialist Republic of Bosnia and Herzegovina	1974-1990	Assembly	Socio-Political Council (80)
Socialist Republic of Bosnia and Herzegovina	1974-1990	Assembly	Council of Municipalities (80)
Socialist Republic of Bosnia and Herzegovina	1974-1990	Assembly	Council of Associated Labour (160)
Socialist Republic of Croatia	1963-1974	Parliament	Republican Council
Socialist Republic of Croatia	1963-1974	Parliament	Economic Council
Socialist Republic of Croatia	1963-1974	Parliament	Social-Health Council
Socialist Republic of Croatia	1963-1974	Parliament	Educational-Cultural Council
Socialist Republic of Croatia	1963-1974	Parliament	Organization-Political Council
Socialist Republic of Croatia	1974-1990	Parliament	Socio-Political Council (80)
Socialist Republic of Croatia	1974-1990	Parliament	Council of Municipalities (varied)
Socialist Republic of Croatia	1974-1990	Parliament	Council of Associated Labour (160)
Socialist Republic of Macedonia	1974-1990	Assembly	Socio-Political Council
Socialist Republic of Macedonia	1974-1990	Assembly	Council of Municipalities
Socialist Republic of Macedonia	1974-1990	Assembly	Council of Associated Labour
Socialist Republic of Montenegro	1974-1990	Assembly	Socio-Political Council
Socialist Republic of Montenegro	1974-1990	Assembly	Council of Municipalities
Socialist Republic of Montenegro	1974-1990	Assembly	Council of Associated Labour
Socialist Republic of Serbia	1974-1991	Assembly	Socio-Political Council (90)
Socialist Republic of Serbia	1974-1991	Assembly	Council of Municipalities (90)
Socialist Republic of Serbia	1974-1991	Assembly	Council of Associated Labour (160)
Socialist Republic of Slovenia	1974-1990	Assembly	Socio-Political Council
Socialist Republic of Slovenia	1974-1990	Assembly	Council of Municipalities
Socialist Republic of Slovenia	1974-1990	Assembly	Council of Associated Labour
Legislatures of provinces
Socialist Autonomous Province of Kosovo	1974-1990	Assembly	Socio-Political Council
Socialist Autonomous Province of Kosovo	1974-1990	Assembly	Council of Municipalities
Socialist Autonomous Province of Kosovo	1974-1990	Assembly	Council of Associated Labour
Socialist Autonomous Province of Vojvodina	1974-1990	Assembly	Socio-Political Council
Socialist Autonomous Province of Vojvodina	1974-1990	Assembly	Council of Municipalities
Socialist Autonomous Province of Vojvodina	1974-1990	Assembly	Council of Associated Labour
