= The Music Room =

The Music Room or Music Room or variation, may refer to:

== Entertainment ==
- Jalsaghar, a 1958 film also known as Jalsaghar: The Music Room
- The Music Room, a 2009 novel by William Fiennes
- The Music Room, a 1990 novel by Dennis McFarland
- The Music Room (album), 2014 album by Sonu Nigam and Bickram Ghosh
- Music Room (TV series), British music TV show
- "The Music Room" (short story), a 2016 short story by Stephen King
- "The Music Room" (painting), painting by Mihály Munkácsy

== Rooms ==
- The Music Room, a display chamber at the tourist attraction American Treasure Tour
- Music Room, a chamber designed by James Wyatt in 1788 in Exminster, Devon, England, UK; at Powderham Castle
- Desden Room, a.k.a. Music Room, a chamber at the Home of Franklin D. Roosevelt National Historic Site
- Music Room, a chamber in Asheville, North Carolina, USA; at the Biltmore Estate
- Music Room, a chamber in Bath, England, UK; at the Herschel Museum of Astronomy
- Music Room, a chamber in Lisbon, Portugal; at the Palace of Queluz
- Music Room, a chamber in Olean, New York, USA; at the Conklin Mountain House

== See also ==
- Music rehearsal space
- Music (disambiguation)
- Room (disambiguation)
- Music from Another Room (disambiguation)
- Chamber music (disambiguation)
