= Chamber =

Chamber or The Chamber may refer to:

== Organizations and government ==
- Chamber of commerce, a form of business network
- Legislative chamber, a deliberative assembly within a legislature
- Debate chamber, a room for people to discuss and debate

== Arts and entertainment ==
- Chamber (character), in Marvel comics
- The Chamber (game show), an American TV show
- The Chamber (novel), by John Grisham, 1994
  - The Chamber (1996 film), based on the novel
- The Chamber (2016 film), a survival film
- Chamber (band), a German musical ensemble

== Business ==
- Barristers' chamber - office used by lawyers

== Other uses ==
- Chamber (firearms), part of a weapon
- Combustion chamber, part of an engine in which fuel is burned
- Environmental chamber, used in testing environmental conditions
- Execution chamber, where capital punishment is carried out
- Gas chamber, apparatus for killing humans or animals
- Chambar, or Chamber, a town in Pakistan

== See also ==
- Chambers (disambiguation)
- Chamber music (disambiguation)
- Great chamber, in an English castle or manor house
- Chambre (disambiguation), French for chamber
- Room
