= Chambre =

Chambre (French for chamber) may refer to:

- Chambre des Pairs
- Chambre des Députés
- Chambre de bonne
- Chambre introuvable
- Valet de chambre
- Chambre Ardente

== People with the surname ==
- Alan Chambré
- Calcot Chambre

== See also ==
- Chambre des représentants (disambiguation)
- Chamber (disambiguation)
