= Multicameralism =

Legislature with three or more chambers

Nations with a bicameral legislature. Nations with a unicameral legislature and an advisory body. Nations with a unicameral legislature. Nations with no legislature. Nations with a vacant legislature or data unavailable.

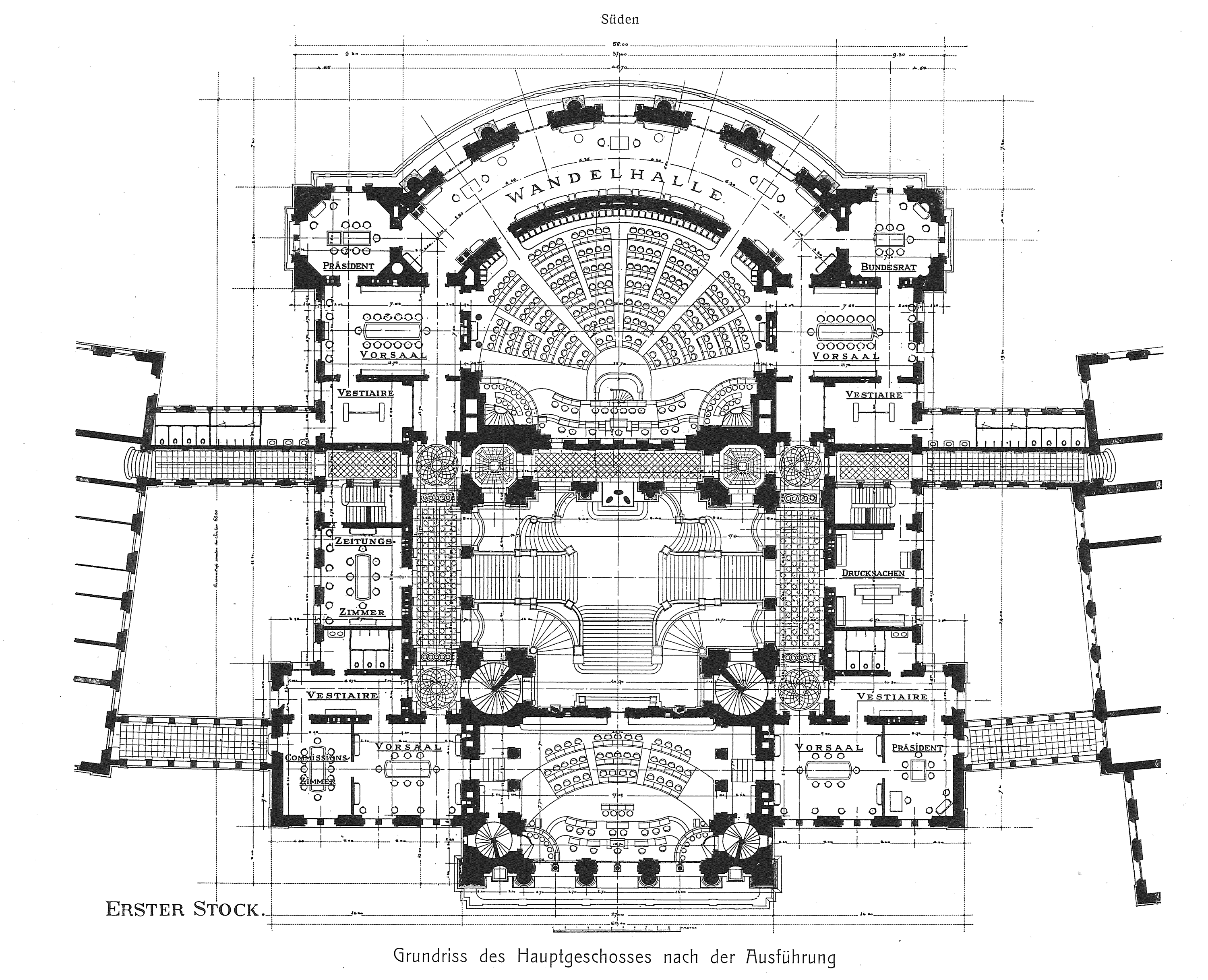
Switzerland has a bicameral legislature. The image shows the Federal Palace of Switzerland, with the National Council (top) and the Council of States (bottom).

In contrast to unicameralism, and bicameralism, multicameralism is the condition in which a legislature is divided into more than two deliberative assemblies, which are commonly called "chambers" or "houses". This usually includes tricameralism with three chambers, but can also describe a system with any amount more. The word "multicameral" can also relate in other ways to its literal meaning of "many chambered" with use in science or biology.

== Prevalence ==
Approximately half of the world's sovereign states are unicameral. Nevertheless, many current parliaments and congresses have more than one chambers (usually bicameral), which some claim provides multiple perspectives and a form of separation of powers within the government.

== History ==
Many societies in medieval Europe had quasi-legislative assemblies in the form of the Estates of the Realm, typified by those of France. Typically, this body had three chambers representing the three grand divisions of society; the clergy, nobles, and commoners; however, this was not universally the rule; Medieval Scandinavian deliberative assemblies traditionally had four estates: the nobility, the clergy, the burghers, and the peasants. The Swedish and Finnish Riksdag of the Estates survived the longest of these bodies, having four separate legislative houses. Sweden abandoned its four-chamber parliament in 1866, transitioning to a bicameral Riksdag for more than a century before moving to today's unicameral assembly in 1974 (see History of the Riksdag).

When the Grand Duchy of Finland was seized by Russia from Sweden, the four-chambered Diet of Finland, of identical structure to the Swedish Riksdag of the Estates, was established. It continued to legislate for Finland until 1906, being the only ancient legislature to survive to the 20th century while maintaining the traditional estates. In that year, the Diet's four ancient chambers were disbanded and replaced by the modern unicameral Parliament of Finland.

The Parliament of England developed in the opposite direction, merging the two aristocratic estates into the House of Lords, the archetypal upper house, leaving the House of Commons as the elective lower house; in time, the English and later British parliaments became the standard model on which the modern bicameral legislature is based.

== Modern multicameralism ==
Of the ancient assemblies in Europe, only Finland's survived to see the 20th century. As the armies of Revolutionary France conquered much of Europe in the name of liberalism and popular sovereignty, most countries’ newly established or re-established legislative assemblies were structured after either the (originally) unicameral French National Assembly or the bicameral British Parliament. Since the 19th century, tricameral legislatures have been a rare constitutional curiosity, with the overwhelming majority of assemblies having one or two chambers.

=== Iran ===
After the 1979 Iranian Revolution, the Islamic Consultative Assembly is the country's de jure unicameral legisature of the country but a number of political scientists often analyze Iran as having a de facto quadcameral (four-chamber) legislative system. In addition to the Islamic Consulative Assembly as a de facto lower house, the Guardian Council serves as a de facto upper legislative house with absolute veto power where it reviews every bill passed by the Majles to ensure complete compliance with Sharia law and the Iranian Constitution; while the Expediency Discernment Council acts as a third legislative chamber to resolve intractable gridlocks as the Parliament and the Guardian Council clash over a vetoed bill, the Expediency Council steps in to issue a final, binding decision. It can pass temporary laws and override the objections of the Guardian Council; and the Assembly of Experts formally tasked with choosing, overseeing, and theoretically dismissing the Supreme Leader.

=== Yugoslavia ===
The Federal Assembly of Yugoslavia originally had two chambers. After Yugoslavia adopted a new constitution in 1963, its legislature was restructured into four chambers each representing the various sectors of Yugoslav society with an additional chamber representing the general population. The Federal Assembly was the only legislature anywhere with five chambers, with a constitutional amendment later adding a sixth component described as either a chamber or sub-chamber. Yugoslavia adopted yet another constitution in 1974, abolishing the Federal Assembly and replacing it with a bicameral legislature simply known as the Assembly of Yugoslavia.

=== South Africa ===
Perhaps the best-known multicameral assembly in modern times is the Tricameral Parliament of the waning days of Apartheid South Africa; established in an effort to stabilize the collapsing Apartheid system, it was intended to give limited representation to the country's Cape Coloured and Indian populations to stabilize white-minority rule. The assembly failed to stem calls for universal suffrage, and was tremendously unpopular with the non-white population. When apartheid was abolished, the Tricameral Parliament disappeared with it, replaced with today's bicameral assembly.

== Benefits ==
Proponents of multicameral legislatures hold that multiple legislative chambers offer the opportunity to re-debate and correct errors in either chamber in parallel, and in some cases to introduce legislation in either chamber. Advocates of multicameralism also contend that multiple legislative chambers are (best) able to represent the various important sectors of society (such as culturally or linguistically distinct, geographically different or similarly interested populations that comprise a country - i.e. the various states of the United States of America or provinces of Canada, each with their own geographical borders, subcultures, interests and even languages i.e. English, French, Spanish), which may not be able to be adequately represented by a singular legislative body. Supporters of multicameralism also posit that a critical weakness of a unicameral system can be a potential lack of restraint on the majority (mob rule) and incompatibility with the separation of powers between the legislative and executive branches of government, particularly noticeable in parliamentary systems where the leaders of the parliamentary majority also dominate the executive.

Besides separate chambers with separate elections, other ways to divide the legislature are standing committees and parliamentary groups. Standing committee members are chosen from representatives, and they form a significant platform to further one's political agenda. Parliamentary groups are usually formed by political parties. However, the two terms are not interchangeable, as multiple parties may cooperate to form one group, while a single party can expel representatives from the parliamentary group. Parliamentary groups function as voting blocs formed by like-minded representatives, and can take some of the functions of separate chambers by representing different interests and sectors of the society, e.g. in the form of ethnic parties or agrarian parties. For instance, when the tetracameral Diet of Finland was disbanded, the role of the chamber of the Peasants was overtaken by the Agrarian Union, a political party, in the new unicameral Finnish parliament.

== See also ==
- Federalism
- Polycentric law
