= Legislative chamber =

Assembly of representatives of a representative democracy

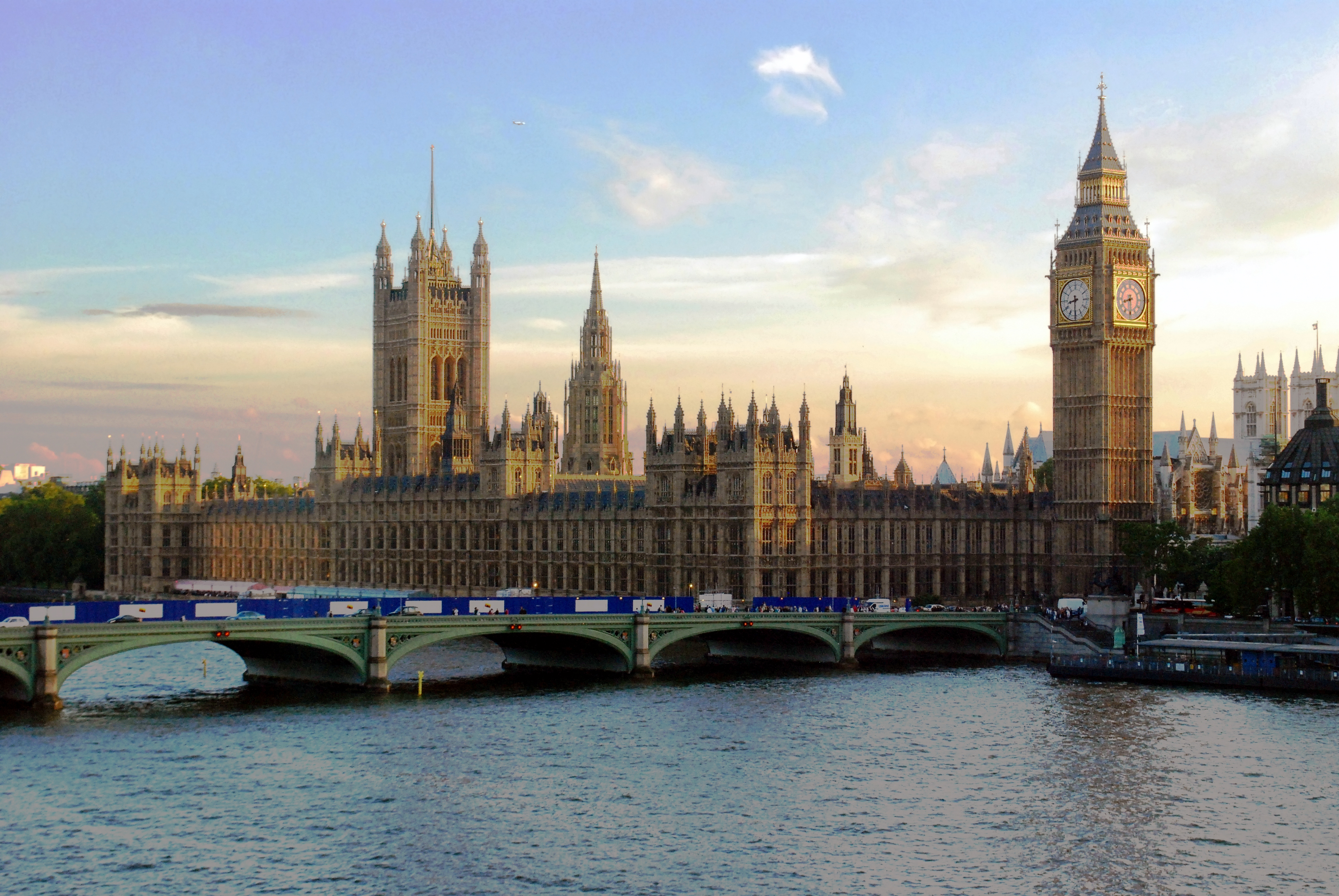
The Palace of Westminster, meeting place of the United Kingdom's legislative bodies.

A legislative chamber or house is a deliberative assembly within a legislature which generally meets and votes separately from the legislature's other chambers. Legislatures are usually unicameral, consisting of only one chamber, or bicameral, consisting of two, but there are rare examples of tricameral and tetracameral legislatures. The Socialist Federal Republic of Yugoslavia is the only country documented as having a pentacameral (and then later hexacameral) legislature.

== Bicameralism ==
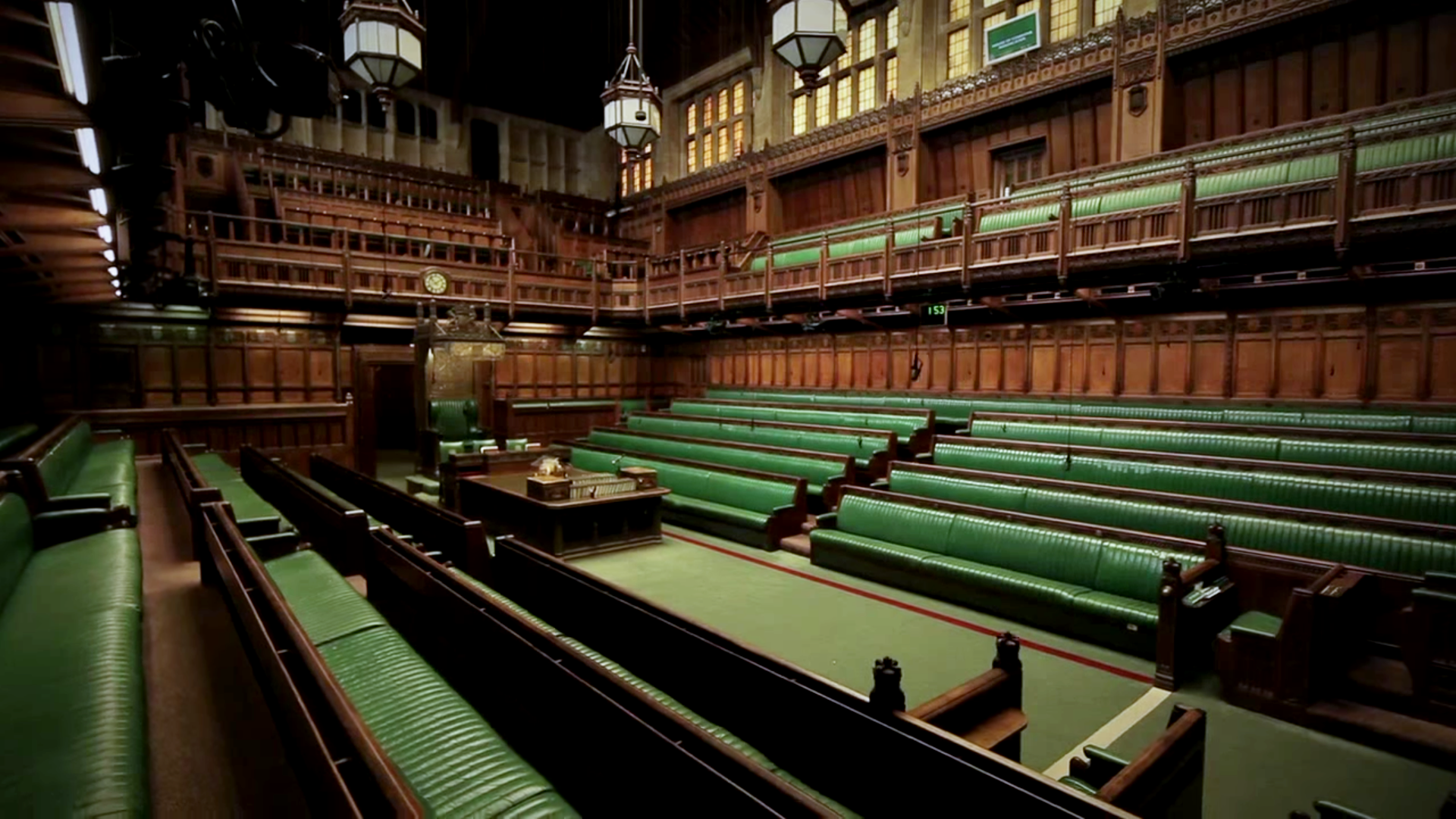
The legislative chamber of the United Kingdom Parliament's lower house, the House of Commons.

In a bicameral legislature, the two bodies are often referred to as an upper and a lower house, where the latter is often regarded as more particularly the representatives of the people. The lower house is almost always the originator of legislation, and the upper house is the body that offers the "second look" and decides whether to veto or approve the bills. In the United Kingdom legislation can be originated in either house, but the lower house can ultimately prevail if the two houses repeatedly disagree. In most countries the lower house also has sole or predominant control over matters to do with finance and taxation.

A parliament's lower house is usually composed of at least 100 members, in countries with populations of over 3 million. The number of seats rarely exceeds 400, even in very large countries. Among the countries with large lower houses are France, where the National Assembly has 577 members, and Japan, where the House of Representatives has 475 members. The upper house of a parliament customarily has anywhere from 20 to 200 seats, but almost always significantly fewer than the lower house. In the United Kingdom however, the lower house (the House of Commons) has 650 members, but the upper house (the House of Lords) currently has slightly more members than the lower house, and at one time (before the exclusion of most of the hereditary peers) had considerably more.

== Merging of chambers ==
Until 1953, the Rigsdag in Denmark was divided into two houses, the "Folketing" and "Landsting", but has since become a unicameral legislature. The same goes with Sweden, and its "Riksdag" until 1971. The Norwegian parliament (Storting) was officially divided in two chambers 1814–2009, but functioned as a single chamber in practice, a situation called Qualified unicameralism.

== Floor and committee ==
The floor is the name for the full assembly, and a committee is a small deliberative assembly that is usually subordinate to the floor. In the United Kingdom, either chamber may opt to deal with certain of its business (such as detailed consideration of a Bill) either in a specialist committee, a committee-of-the-whole (sometimes called the "main committee"), or on the floor of the House itself.

== Security ==
The buildings of a national legislature are usually equipped with an internal police. In some places, the general police force or the defence forces generally are not allowed access without an invitation and authorisation from the house(s) or presiding officer(s). This is part of the protection of broader principles of parliamentary privilege, free debate, and legislative independence—especially from control of the executive government.

== See also ==
- Delegated legislation
- Inter-Parliamentary Union
- Witenagemot
