= Assembly of Yugoslavia =

Legislative assembly in Yugoslavia

Parliament of Yugoslavia Народна скупштина
- Legislative body of Yugoslavia

Type
- Type: Unicameral (1920–1931; 1942–1945); Bicameral (1931–1941; 1946–1963; 1974–1992); Pentacameral (1963–1967); Hexacameral (1967–1974)

History
- Founded: 1920
- Disbanded: 1992
- Succeeded by: Several post-Yugoslav legislatures: list; National Assembly of Bosnia and Herzegovina; Croatian Parliament; Assembly of the Republic of Macedonia; Slovenian Parliament; Federal Assembly of Yugoslavia
- Seats: 308 (at dissolution)

Elections
- First election: 1920
- Last election: 1989

Meeting place
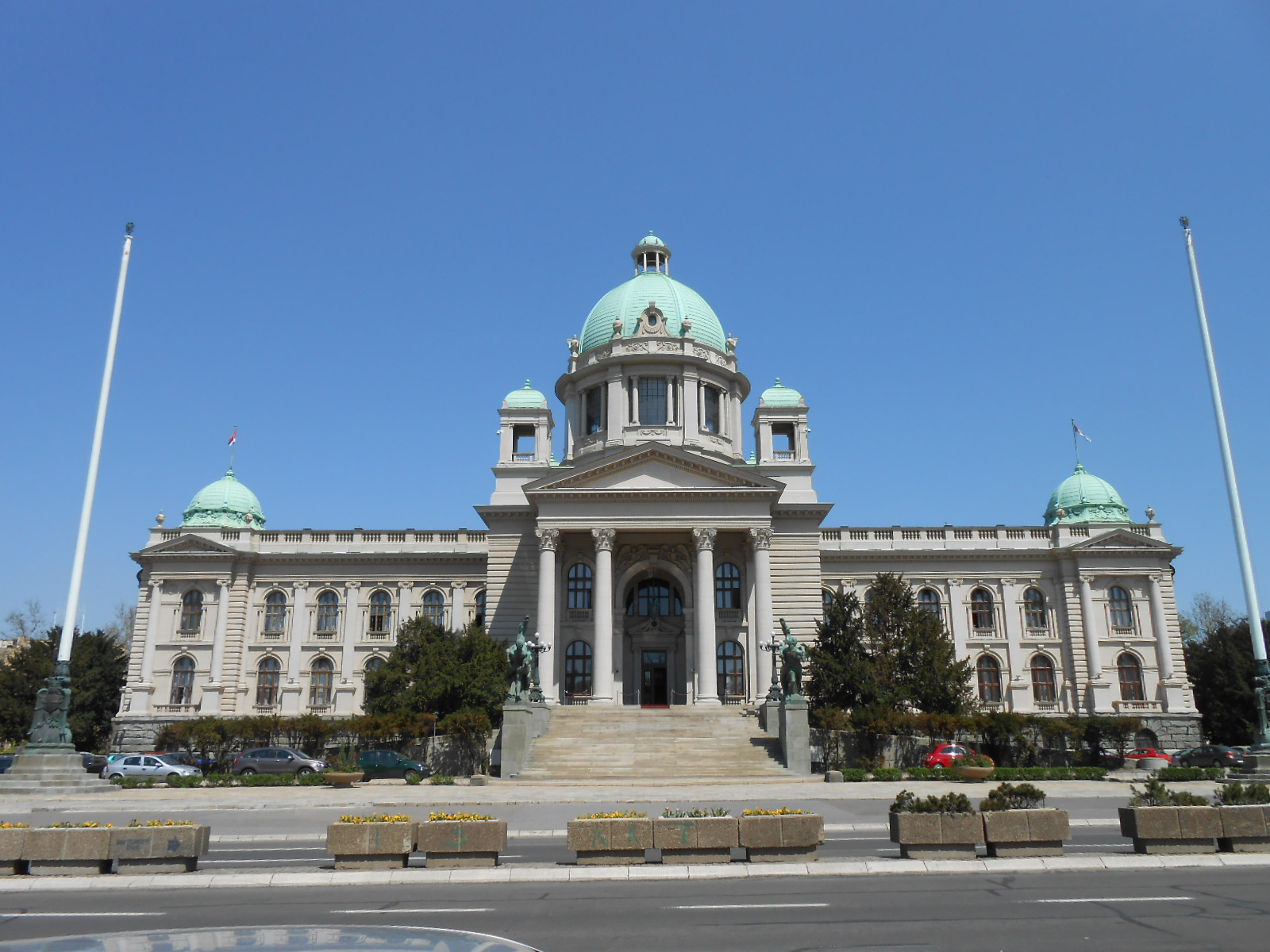
- Federal Assembly Building, Belgrade

Constitution
- Constitution of Yugoslavia

The legislature of Yugoslavia was known in the Kingdom of Yugoslavia as the National Assembly (Narodna skupština) from 1920 to 1941, while after World War II in the Socialist Federal Republic of Yugoslavia the name was changed to Federal Assembly (Serbo-Croatian: Savezna skupština/Савезна скупштина).

The Yugoslav legisulature resided in the building of the House of the National Assembly which subsequently served as the seat of the Assembly of Serbia and Montenegro and since 2006 hosts the National Assembly of Serbia.

== Kingdom ==
The first parliamentary body of the state was the Temporary National Representation which existed until the first elections were held on 28 November 1920. The new parliament was known as the Constitutional Assembly. The assembly adopted the Vidovdan Constitution on 28 June 1921, after which it became known as the National Assembly.

After the end of the January 6th Dictatorship, in 1931 the kingdom returned to a constitutional monarchy and the National Assembly became the National Representation consisting of the National Assembly (lower chamber) and the Senate (upper chamber).

== Anti-Fascist Council for the National Liberation of Yugoslavia ==
During the Axis occupation of Yugoslavia (1941−1944), the Anti-Fascist Council for the National Liberation of Yugoslavia (AVNOJ) was the political umbrella organization for the national liberation councils of the Yugoslav Resistance.

== Socialist Federal Republic ==
As a result of the Treaty of Vis, AVNOJ was reformed into the Temporary National Assembly which also included several dozen members of the assembly elected in 1938. After the consolidation of power by the communists in late 1945, the Constitutional Assembly was established. The Constitutional Assembly was divided into two houses: the Federal Assembly and the Assembly of Peoples.

With the adoption of a constitution in 1946, the name National Assembly was adopted again. It was divided into two councils (chambers): the Federal Council, and the Council of Peoples. With the amendment of the constitution in 1953, the Federal People's Assembly was divided into the Federal Council and the Council of Producers.

In 1963 with the adoption of a new constitution, the Federal Assembly was divided into five chambers: the Federal Council, the Economic Council, the Educational-Cultural Council, the Social-Health Council and the Organization-Political Council. In 1967 the Council of Nations, previously a "sub-chamber" which was established in 1953, became a separate chamber from the Federal Council, while in 1968 the Federal Council was demoted in favor of the Council of Nations and the Organization-Political Council changed its name into Socio-Political Council. The Federal Assembly of Yugoslavia was the only pentacameral (later hexacameral) legislature in political history.

After the 1974 Yugoslav Constitution was adopted, the Assembly of the SFRY was bicameral, with the lower house called the Federal Chamber and an upper house called the Chamber of Republics and Provinces. The Federal Chamber had 30 members from each Republic and 20 from each Autonomous Province, while the Chamber of Republics and Provinces had 12 members from each Republic and 8 from each Autonomous Province. The indirect election of the upper house by the assembly of each respective republic and autonomous province, instituted when it first came into existence as a "sub-chamber" over two decades earlier, was retained, although now with the stipulation that delegates would remain members of the assembly which elected them, while the option for autonomous provinces to elect delegates from the assembly of their republic rather than from their own assembly was deleted. Elections to the lower house still involved the communal assemblies across the country, as had been the case under the 1963 Constitution, but constituencies in the chamber were abolished. As such, instead of the local communal assemblies voting for a delegate from their own constituency, all the communal assemblies within a given republic or province were tasked with electing its delegates to that chamber. This reform had a second, more notable effect in that direct elections for the Federal Chamber, whereby delegates elected by the communal assemblies would subsequently need to obtain an absolute majority of that constituency's voters in order to be elected to the chamber, were discontinued as there were no longer individual constituencies for the delegates to represent. This was a first in Yugoslav political history: previously, even national elections held before universal suffrage still involved the direct election of at least one chamber of the assembly.

When the League of Communists collapsed in 1990 amid ethnic tensions, the Assembly was shut down. The institution would be resurrected as the Federal Assembly of the Federal Republic of Yugoslavia in 1992, but this assembly had elected members.

== Gallery ==
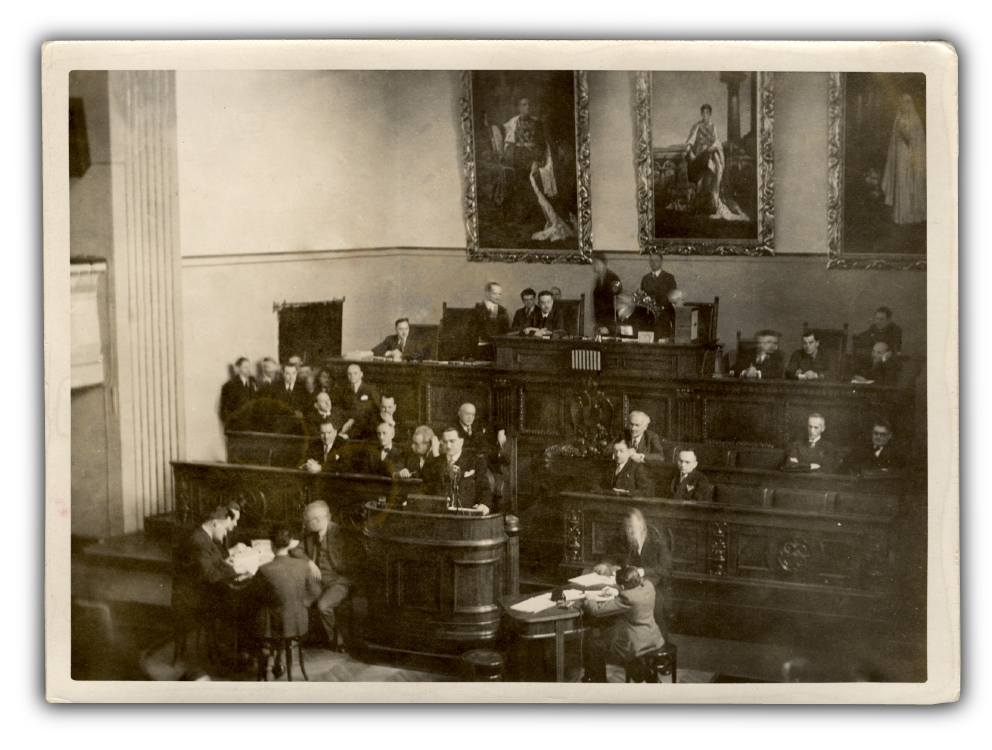
The National Representation in 1936

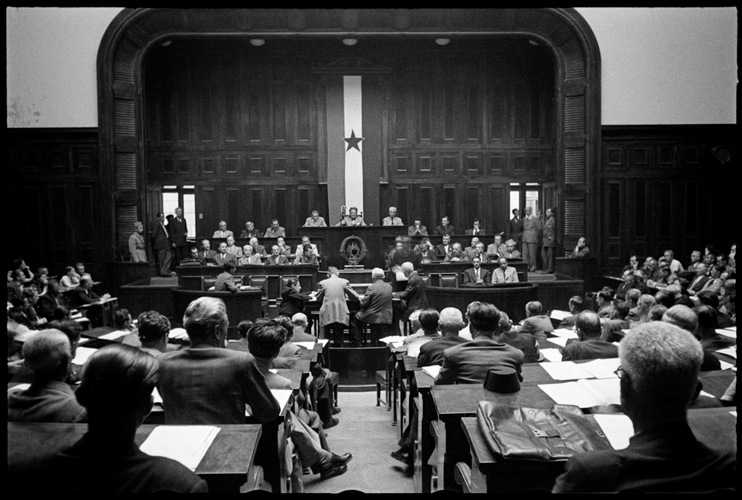
The Constitutional Assembly in 1945

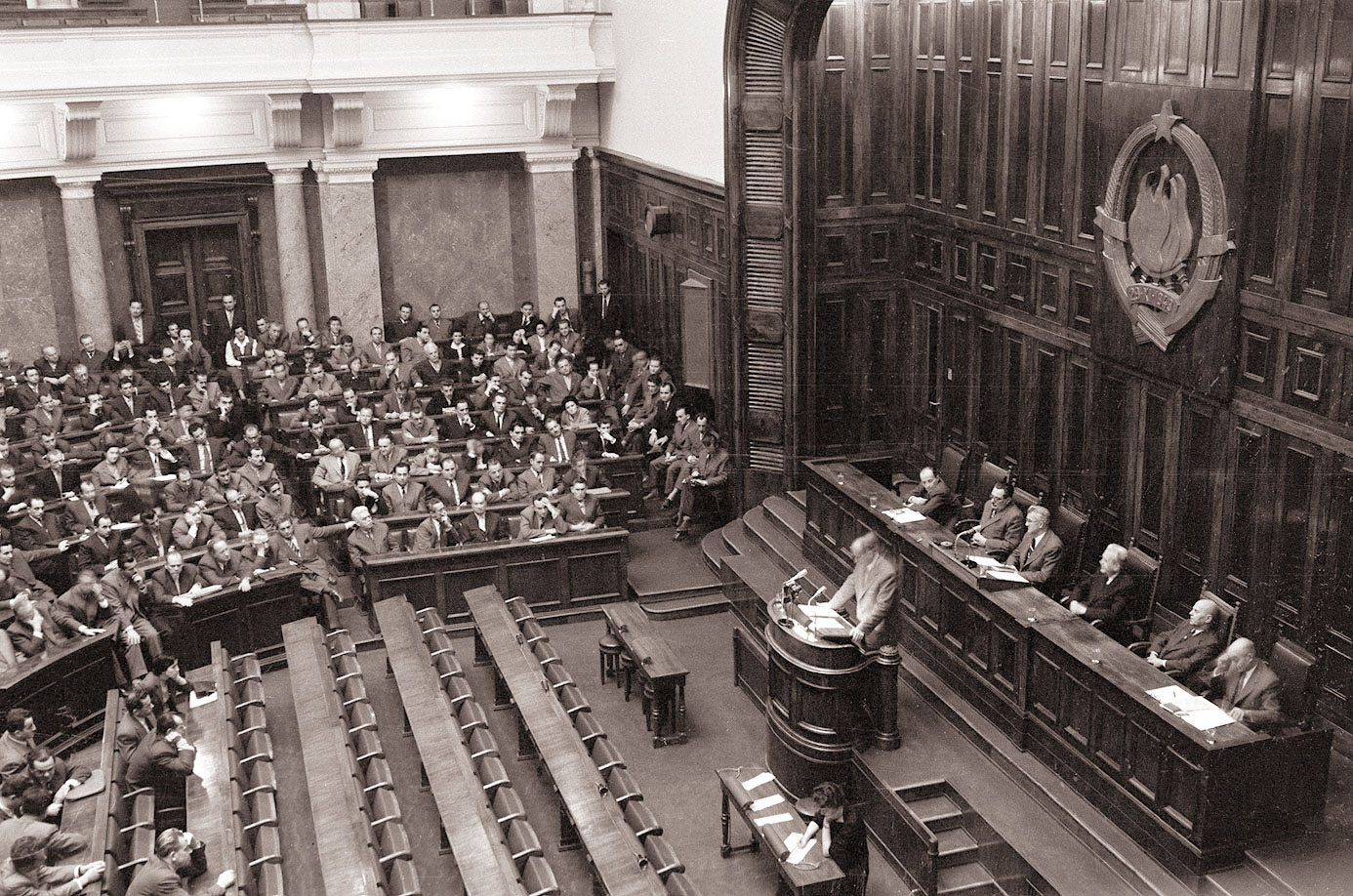
The Federal People's Assembly in 1958

== See also ==
- President of the Assembly of Yugoslavia
- Assembly of Serbia and Montenegro
  - List of presidents of the Assembly of Serbia and Montenegro
- National Assembly (Serbia) – Serbia's parliament which is housed in the same building that had been the Federal Assembly building
- Parliamentary Assembly of Bosnia and Herzegovina
- Croatian Parliament
- Parliament of Montenegro
- Assembly of North Macedonia
- Slovenian Parliament
