= Chamber music (disambiguation) =

Chamber music is a form of classical music written for a small group of instruments.

Chamber music may also refer to:

== Music ==
- Chamber Music (Berio), a 1953 composition by Luciano Berio

=== Albums ===
- Chambers' Music, a 1956 album by Paul Chambers
- Chamber Music, a 2004 album by Blueprint
- Chamber Music (Thighpaulsandra album), 2005
- Chamber Music (Ballake Sissoko and Vincent Segal album), 2009
- Chamber Music (Coal Chamber album), 1999
- Wu-Tang Chamber Music, a 2009 album by Wu-Tang Clan

=== Songs ===
- "Chamber Music", a 2011 song by Ballake Sissoko and Vincent Segal from Chamber Music
- "Chamber Music", a 2009 song by Paolo Nutini from Sunny Side Up
- "Chamber Music", a 2000 song by Wu-Tang Clan from The W
- "Chamber Music", a 1998 song by Xzibit from 40 Dayz & 40 Nightz

== Other uses ==
- Chamber Music Journal, a periodical for chamber music
- Chamber Music (film), a 1925 German film
- Chamber Music (play), a 1962 play by Arthur Kopit
- Chamber Music (poetry collection), a 1907 collection of poems by James Joyce
- Música de Cámara, Hispanic classical music organization

== See also ==
- List of chamber music festivals
- Music (disambiguation)
- Chamber (disambiguation)
- The Music Room (disambiguation)
