= Chambre des représentants =

Chambre des représentants may refer to:

- Belgian Chamber of Representatives (Chambre des représentants de Belgique), the Chamber of Representatives of Belgium
- Chambre des représentants du Maroc, the Chamber of Representatives of Morocco
- Chambre des représentants de France, the 1815 French Chamber of Representatives during the Hundred Days
