= 1963 Yugoslav Constitution =

Fundamental law of Yugoslavia from 1963 to 1974

The 1963 Yugoslav Constitution was the second communist state constitution of the Socialist Federal Republic of Yugoslavia. It came into effect on April 7, 1963. The constitution was the result of beliefs of the governing structures that Yugoslav self-management relations have been sufficiently overcome in the society that it deserved a new and final constitutional definition and enthroning.

The parliamentary Federal Assembly (Skupština) was divided into one general chamber, the Federal Chamber, and four chambers given specific bureaucratic responsibilities. The constitution directed that individual republics be represented only in the Chamber of Nationalities, a part of the Federal Chamber that in 1967 became a separate chamber of the Assembly in its own right. With this, the Federal Assembly became the only pentacameral, later hexacameral, legislature on the planet.

President Josip Broz Tito retained his position as president of the party but renounced his state position as president of the Federal Executive Council, a change that further separated party and state functions. The 1963 constitution also introduced the concept of rotation, which prohibited remaining at higher or lower level executive positions for more than two four-year mandates. Moreover, it extended human and civil rights and established constitutionally guaranteed court procedures.

The constitution was superseded by the adoption of a fourth and final constitution in 1974.

== Regulations ==
The definition of the state is characterized not only by provision that it is a federal state, but also a socialist democratic community, which was supposed to indicate the tendency towards the Marxist ideal of the withering away of the state.

Public property, self-management and self-organization of working people at the micro and macro level was declared the basis of Economic planning.

The right to social self-management was declared untouchable, and districts in the state (municipality, county, autonomous provinces of Serbia, Socialist Republics and the Federation itself), became socio-political communities. In the regulation yet unseen in constitutional law, the hierarchy between these units was destroyed and a system of mutual rights and obligations was introduced.

The Federal Assembly was proclaimed as the highest authority of government and social self-government, and in the federal and republican assembly, in addition to the general-political council, greater workers' communities were introduced - economic, educational, cultural, social and health, organizational and political. Assemblies of the autonomous provinces could have more.

President of the Republic became independent from Federal Executive Council and became an autonomous authority of the federation. The Constitutional Court of Yugoslavia and the constitutional courts of the member republics were introduced.

== Practice ==
42 amendments were added to this Constitution until the adoption of the new 1974 Yugoslav Constitution. This shows that the stability of institutions was not achieved for longer terms. New amendments strengthened the position of autonomous provinces, introduced new areas of self-government and the former federal agencies gradually became common within the federation, instead of remaining superior over the republics.
