= 1953 Yugoslav constitutional amendments =

The 1953 Yugoslav Constitutional Law was a big packet of constitutional amendments to the 1946 Yugoslav Constitution, the communist state constitution of Yugoslavia, with the goal of introducing the idea of self-management in the constitutional matter of the Federal People's Republic of Yugoslavia. It came into effect on January 13, 1953. The amended 1946 constitution would remain in power until the adoption of the 1963 Yugoslav Constitution.

This packet of constitutional amendments was approved at the sixth congress of the League of Communists of Yugoslavia. It partially separated party and state political functions and granted some civil and political rights to individuals and constituent republics. It further established legal foundations for workers' control over enterprises and expanded local governmental power. It established the Federal People's Assembly with two houses: a Federal Chamber, directly representing the regions, and a Chamber of Producers, representing economic enterprises and worker groups. The executive branch of the federal government (Federal Executive Council or FEC) included only the five ministries dealing with national affairs and foreign policy. The League of Communists retained exclusive political control, based on the Leninist credo that the state bureaucracy would wither away, and that a multiparty system would only bring more cumbersome bureaucratic institutions.

== Regulations ==
On the basis of the political and social order, social ownership on the means of production, self-producers in the economy, self-management of working people in the municipality, the city and the county and self-working people in the fields of education, culture and social services was declared.

Yugoslavia was proclaimed a socialist, democratic, federal state of sovereign and equal nations. All power in the country belonged to the working people through their representatives in the various bodies, as well as directly – election, revocation of representatives, assemblies, councils and other forms of self-government, which was declared a basis for the entire organization.

In the field of the representative body this was reflected in the introduction of the Council of Producers, as the home of the representatives of professions, in addition to a political home. The Federal Council was elected by universal suffrage, with elections now featuring multiple candidates. Nevertheless, the one-party system of the League of Communists was retained.

Until then, the highest existing executive body, the Government was replaced with two executive authorities of the Federal People's Assembly – the President of the Republic and the Federal Executive Council (known as FEC), who were responsible for carrying the assembly's work into fruition, at least on paper. The President of the Republic was ex officio the president of the Federal Executive Council. The Presidency of the National Assembly, which had served as a collective head of state, was dissolved, with its functions largely subsumed into the President of the Republic and any remaining functions assumed directly by the Federal People's Assembly.

Democratic centralism was also abandoned, the rights of the republics and autonomous regions were increased, and in the municipality, the city and the county self-management was introduced.
