= Music from Another Room =

Music from Another Room may refer to:

- Music from Another Room (EP), a 2001 EP by The Juliana Theory
- Music from Another Room (film), a 1998 romantic comedy
