= 1946 Yugoslav Constitution =

First constitution of the Federal People's Republic of Yugoslavia

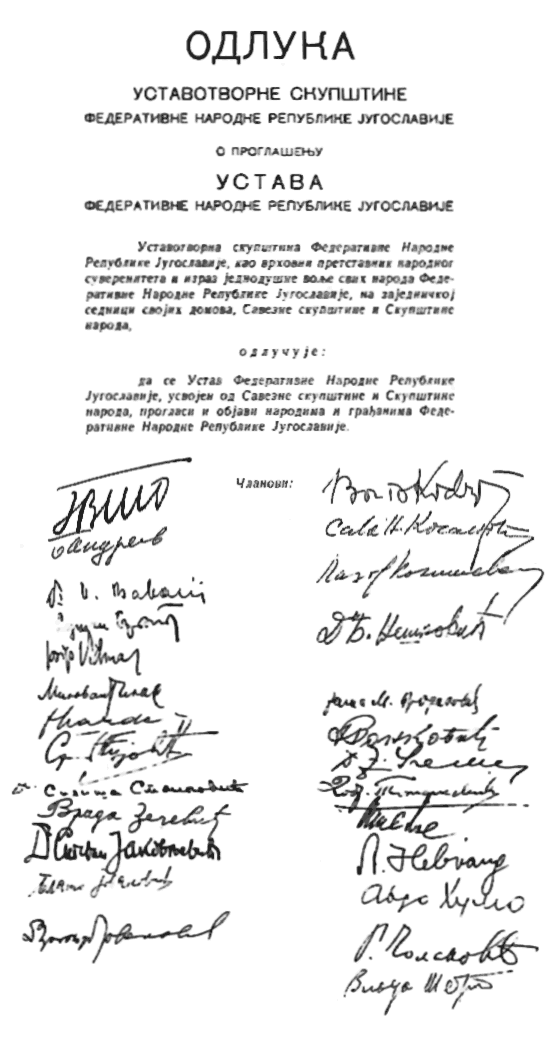
Act of promulgation of the Constitution of the Federal People's Republic of Yugoslavia (1946)

The 1946 Yugoslav Constitution, officially titled as the Constitution of the Federal People's Republic of Yugoslavia (Serbo-Croatian: Устав Федеративне Народне Републике Југославије / Ustav Federativne Narodne Republike Jugoslavije), was the first communist state constitution of the Federal People's Republic of Yugoslavia. It was adopted by the Constitutional Assembly of Yugoslavia, elected on 11 November 1945. The Constitution came into effect at its promulgation, on 31 January 1946.

== Background ==
Elections for the Constitutional Assembly of Yugoslavia were held 11 November 1945. Electoral process was dominated by the People's Front of Yugoslavia (PFY), a political coalition led by the ruling Communist Party of Yugoslavia (CPY). Since opposition parties were suppressed, electoral list of PFY won an overwhelming electoral victory, thus allowing CPY to proceed with its plans for definite abolition of the already weakened monarchy. On November 29 (1945), by a declaration of the Constitutional Assembly, Yugoslavia was officially proclaimed as people's republic, and federation, under the name: Federal People's Republic of Yugoslavia (FPRY). In the same time, drafting of the new constitution was initiated. On 31 January 1946, Constitution was adopted and promulgated. Solemn proclamation of the new Constitution was officiated by Ivan Ribar, President of the Presidency of the Constitutional Assembly of Yugoslavia.

== Constitutional provisions ==
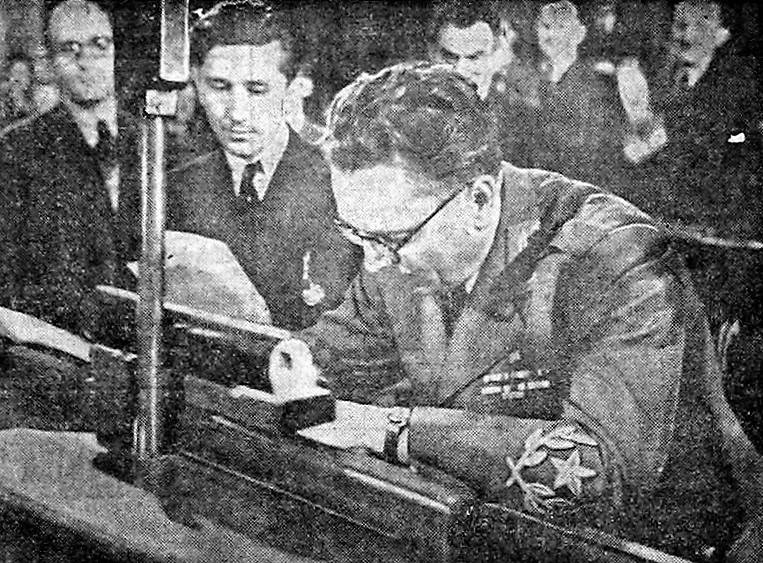
Signing of the Declaration of 29 November 1945, by Josip Broz Tito, President of the Yugoslav Government

Constitution has defined Yugoslavia as a people's republic, and a federation (Article 1), thus finalizing two main political goals of the People's Front of Yugoslavia (PFY), and the ruling Communist Party of Yugoslavia (CPY), led by Josip Broz Tito, at that time President of the Yugoslav Government.

Under the Article 2 of the Constitution, federal state was defined as union of six federated states, in following constitutional order: the People's Republic of Serbia, the People's Republic of Croatia, the People's Republic of Slovenia, the People's Republic of Bosnia and Herzegovina, the People's Republic of Macedonia, and the People's Republic of Montenegro.

Two existing autonomous units were also confirmed, within the People's Republic of Serbia: first being the Autonomous Province of Vojvodina, and second being the Autonomous Region of Kosovo and Metohija. Under the Article 44, creation of new autonomous provinces and new autonomous regions was also allowed.

Equality of all citizens and all groups was proclaimed and guarantied, but not a single nationality or ethnicity was mentioned by name in the entire text of the Constitution.

The official languages were not defined.

One of the most important characteristics of the Constitution was that it resembled the Constitution of the Soviet Union (1936). Yugoslav constitution promoted dominant position of state property, organization of authority on the principle of unity of authority and dichotomous division of all state authority on state authorities and state administration.

The division of jurisdiction existed between the federal state, and six federated states. Distribution of power was based on the principle of "democratic centralism", which was defined by the leading Yugoslav constitutional ideologue of that time: Edvard Kardelj. That actually meant the introduction of the etatistic social models and centralist state regulations, side by side with the nominal federalism. Ideological, political and other forms of pluralism were excluded.

This Constitution enabled further consolidation of the communist regime in the country. After the conflict with the Soviet Union broke out in 1948, Yugoslav authorities decided to find their own way to socialism. Legislative reform began with partial changes, in 1950 and 1952, but crucial change will be made by the Yugoslav Constitutional law of 1953.

== Commentaries ==
In his address to the Fifth Congress (1948) of the Communist Party of Yugoslavia, general secretary Josip Broz Tito referred to several articles of the Constitution to demonstrate its liberal nature.

Let us take only Article 1 of the Constitution, which says: "The Federal People's Republic of Yugoslavia is a federal national state of republican structure, a community of peoples enjoying equal rights, who on the basis of the right to self-determination, including the right to secede, have expressed their will to live together in a federated state."

There, that is how national equality is settled here, that is how it is codified and put fully into practice.
Further, how is the question of power settled in the Constitution and in practice in this country?
In Article 6 it is stated: "In the Federal People's Republic of Yugoslavia all power derives from the people and belongs to the people. The people exercise their power through the freely elected representative bodies of state authority, from the people's committees which, from the local people's committees up to the assemblies of the people's republics and the People's Assembly of the Federal People's Republic of Yugoslavia originated and developed in the People's Liberation War against Fascism and reaction and which are the basic achievements of that struggle."

Consequently, the Constitution has only confirmed, or rather codified, what was won during the war, that is to say the power of the people, the power of a real people's democracy.

== See also ==
- 1945 Yugoslav parliamentary election
- People's Front of Yugoslavia
- Communist Party of Yugoslavia
- Yugoslav-Soviet Split

== Sources ==
- Bataković, Dušan T., ed. (2005). Histoire du peuple serbe [History of the Serbian People] (in French). Lausanne: L’Age d’Homme. ISBN 9782825119587.
- Ćirković, Sima (2004). The Serbs. Malden: Blackwell Publishing. ISBN 9781405142915.
- Cox, John K. (2002). The History of Serbia. Westport, Connecticut: Greenwood Press. ISBN 9780313312908.
- Jelavich, Barbara (1983). History of the Balkans: Twentieth Century. Vol. 2. Cambridge University Press. ISBN 9780521274593.
- Pavlowitch, Stevan K. (2002). Serbia: The History behind the Name. London: Hurst & Company. ISBN 9781850654773.
