= 1974 Yugoslav Constitution =

Fundamental law of Yugoslavia from 1974 to 1992

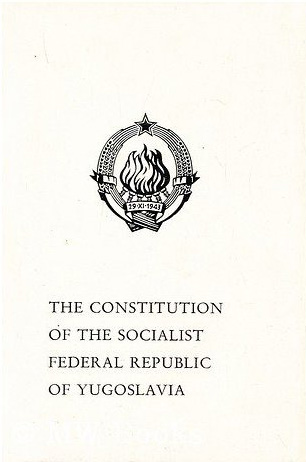
The 1974 Constitution

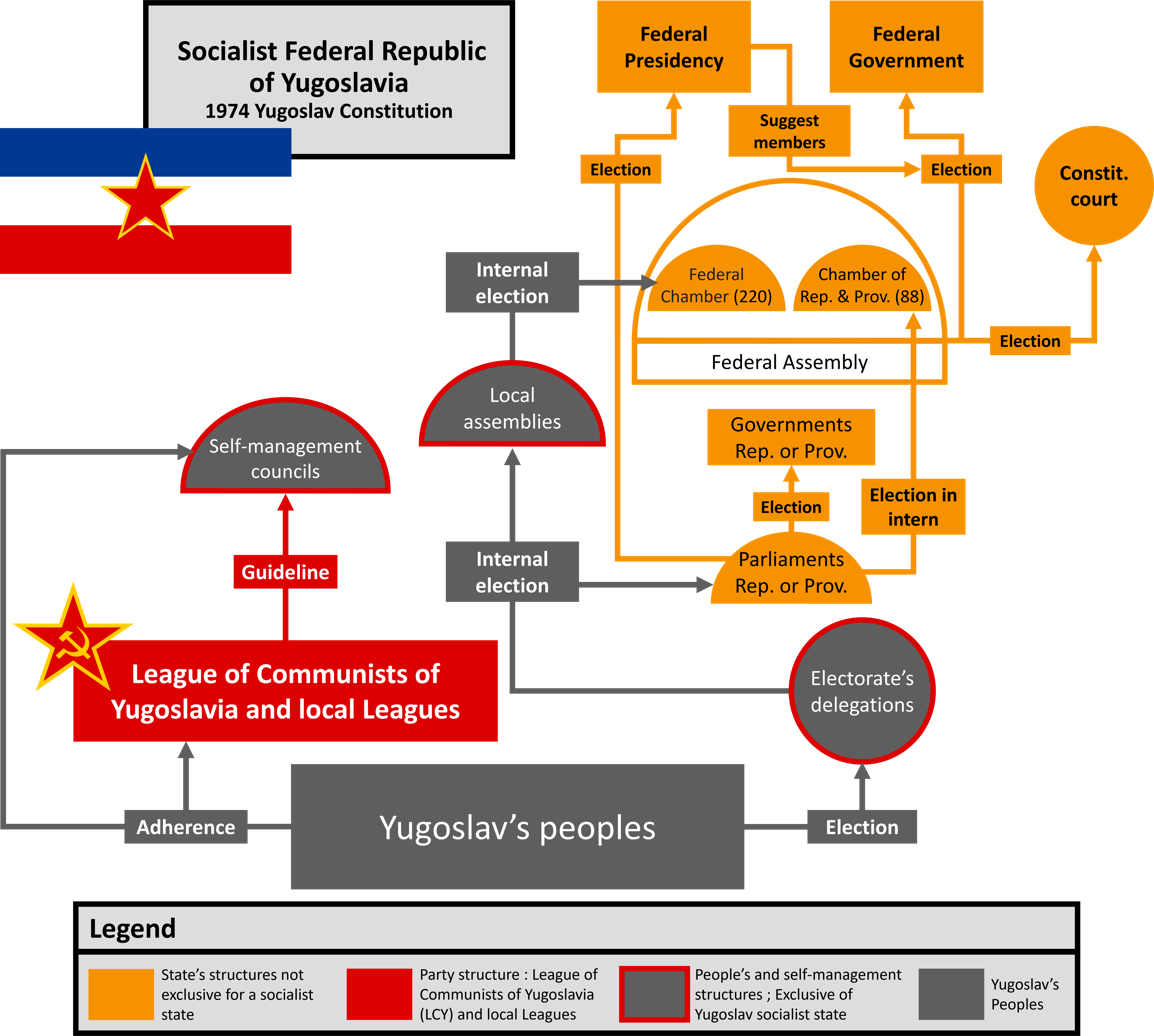
Political system of Yugoslavia according to the 1974 Constitution

The 1974 Yugoslav Constitution was the fourth and final communist state constitution of the Socialist Federal Republic of Yugoslavia. It came into effect on 21 February 1974.

With 406 original articles, the 1974 constitution was one of the longest constitutions in the world. It added elaborate language protecting the self-management system from state interference and expanding representation of republics and provinces in all electoral and policy forums. The Constitution called the restructured Federal Assembly the highest expression of the self-management system. Accordingly, it prescribed a complex electoral procedure for that body, beginning with the local labor and political organizations. Those bodies were to elect commune-level assemblies, which then would elect assemblies at province and republic level; finally, the latter groups would elect the members of the two equal components of the Federal Assembly, the Federal Chamber and the Chamber of Republics and Provinces.

Although the new constitution dealt with the codification of the socio-economic system towards the achievements of the theory of self-management socialism to a greater extent, the most controversial and historical consequences arose from the regulations of the Constitution about the state organization of Yugoslavia, which were later used as the legal basis for the breakup of Yugoslavia and differently interpreted by the warring parties during the armed conflict in the former Yugoslavia.

The new Constitution also reduced the Federal Presidency from twenty-three to nine members, with equal representation for each republic and province and an ex-officio position for the president of the League of Communists. The 1974 Constitution also expanded protection of individual rights and court procedures, with the all-purpose caveat that no citizen could use those freedoms to disrupt the prescribed social system. Finally, Kosovo and Vojvodina, the two constituent provinces of Serbia, received substantially increased autonomy, including de facto veto power in the Serbian parliament.

The Yugoslav Federal Constitution of 1974 confirmed and strengthened the principles of the Yugoslav Federal Constitution Amendments of 1971, which introduced a concept that sovereign rights were exercised by the federal units, and that the federation had only the authority specifically transferred to it by the constitution.

The constitution also proclaimed Josip Broz Tito president for life.

== Background ==
Adoption of the Constitution was preceded by significant political events that occurred several years earlier, and that marked the beginning of the federalization of the country. First, in the summer of 1966, Anti-federalization leader Aleksandar Ranković, one of the closest associates of Josip Broz Tito, was removed from all functions. The federalization ideas of Edvard Kardelj won, and thus began a gradual federalization of Yugoslavia. In 1968 and 1971 amendments were adopted to the Federal Constitution, through which Yugoslav Presidency as a collective leadership body was introduced (1971). Later that year, the republican leadership of SR Croatia was completely dismissed, which propagated their nationalistic politics. And in the autumn of next year (1972), a purge was carried out in the leadership of the SR Serbia. After all that, everything was ready for the adoption of the new Federal Constitution.

== The Constitution ==
By the words of the Constitution, all power belongs to the "working class and working people". In terms of governmental structure, the provinces within Yugoslavia (SAP Vojvodina and SAP Kosovo) have received even greater rights than they had before. Provinces had their state and party Presidencies. Their territory could not be altered without the decision of the Provincial Assembly, provincial governments even got the right to veto decisions of the authorities in Serbia.

Josip Broz Tito, president of Yugoslavia, was named President for Life of Yugoslavia in the Constitution. He was also the President of the Republic and President of the Presidency of Yugoslavia. After his death, all his functions would be transferred to the Presidency of Yugoslavia.

During the public discussion on the proposed changes to the Constitution, Professor of the Belgrade Law School, Mihailo Đurić was sentenced to prison after the publication of the speech in which he opposed the implementation of the planned constitutional changes. Pointing out that Yugoslavia was becoming just a geographical term, on whose soil under the disguise of consistent development of equality between nations, several independent, even conflicting national states were being established, prof. Đurić warned that the proposed constitutional changes not only fundamentally change the character of the former state union of the Yugoslav nations, but rejects the very idea of such a state community. Stressing that if something would be left from the state, it is only because in the next phase of changes we had something to bring to an end.

== Principles of the Constitution ==
The introductory part of the 1974 Constitution presents 10 basic principles:

1. Government: Proceeding from the right of every nation to self-determination, including the right to secession, Yugoslavia is defined as a federal republic of equal nations and nationalities, freely united on the principle of brotherhood and unity in achieving specific and common interest. Holders of the sovereignty of nations and nationalities are the republics and provinces within its constitutional jurisdiction. Decision-making in the federation is based on communication and mutual rights and obligations of the republics and provinces. Socio-economic relations are established as a socialist self-management system.
2. Socio-economic Planning: The basis of socio-economic system is social ownership on the means of production, the right of a working man to self-management and enjoying the fruits of labor, solidarity and reciprocity of rights and obligations of all social actors. Contrary to the Constitution are considered all forms of privatization of public assets, as well as "bureaucratic" or "technocratic" usurpation of resources or monopolization of decision-making.
3. Economic system: Public property does not have a legal title holder, the holder of property rights are neither political institutions, nor economic entities, nor citizens. Working people decide about the distribution of income, socially limited by established criteria of distribution to consumption and reproduction. Social ownership and working people are organized in basic organizations of associated labor. The economy is characterized by cash, credit and market system, the connection, self-governing communication, social compacts, work planning and development among the organizations of associated labor, self-management and socio-political organizations and communities are taken as a basis for regulatory mechanisms. Social activities like education, science, culture and health care are organized into self-governing communities that represent the connection between the organization of associated labor and public interest. The work of the self-employed in private ownership and operation of farmers shall be governed by the same principles as in organizations of associated labor. The coordinated development of the economy through financing the development of underdeveloped republics and provinces is determined as the general interest at the level of Yugoslavia.
4. Socialist self-governing democracy: It is defined as a specific form of the dictatorship of the proletariat which is ensured through a ban on the socio-economic and political organizations aimed at the establishment of capitalist relations. The power of working people is achieved through self-management and decision-making in the basic organizations of associated labor, self-interest communities and local communities and the delegation of representatives to the higher levels of the management bodies of self-governing organizations and the assemblies of socio-political organizations. Principles of work of all public authorities and self-management, personal responsibility, social control and replaceability office holders, the protection of constitutionality and legality are proclaimed, but the dominant role in the implementation of these principles in the framework of the Constitution is reserved for certain political organizations. Social self-protection is defined as the activity of all social actors to protect the self-governing constitutional order. The freedom of socio-political organization of working people is identified, but with the obligation to respect the framework of government socialist system dominated by the Constitution of the superior political organization.
5. Rights and freedom of men and citizens: are limited by the interests of socialist society. The freedom of scientific, cultural and artistic creativity is proclaimed, education is based on the principles of scientific socialism, social policy is based on overcoming the differences resulting from unequal conditions of life and work, veterans' benefits and social security are provided, protection and improvement of environment is introduced.
6. People's Defense is a collateral policy of peace, opposing aggression and pressure, which is an integral part of strengthening the defense capability of the country. It includes the participation of all social and political institutions and autonomous organizations at all levels in defense of the independence, sovereignty, territorial integrity and self-management system. The unity of command of the armed forces is anticipated.
7. International relations of Yugoslavia are based on the principles of peaceful coexistence and active cooperation of equal states and nations, adherence to the principles of the Charter of the United Nations, meeting international commitments and active participation in international organizations. Yugoslavia is committed to non-interference in the internal affairs of other countries, socialist internationalism, rejecting the use of force in international relations to achieve general disarmament, the right of people to self-determinate for the sake of the liberation struggle, independence and free choice of social and political organization for the protection of minority rights, equal economic relations in the world, respect of accepted norms of international law.
8. The role of political and trade union organizations: the League of Communists of Yugoslavia under the Constitution has the responsibility of the political activities to protect and further develop self-governing socialist relations. Socialist Alliance of Working People of Yugoslavia is the widest democratic front of working people and citizens and is under the leadership of the Communist Party in order to achieve political unity and action. In its framework it is possible to discuss social issues, launch political initiatives and harmonization of opinions to determine political attitudes. The Constitution delegated functions of the Socialist Alliance include personnel matters, determining candidates for delegates and persons performing functions in the self and socio-political organizations, exercising social control over the work of the authorities and the management bodies of autonomous organizations and office holders, exercising influence over the system of public information. Voluntary union organizing is integrated into the socialist self-management relations. The union is authorized to delegate representatives to the management and organization of joint work and to socio-political organizations, to initiate and participate directly in the self-communication and social agreements.
9. The goal of socio-economic and political system established by the Constitution of the Yugoslav Republic is the development of the material basis of social relations and towards achieving the principle of communism: "From each according to ability - to each according to his needs." All social actors are invited to "contribute to the realization of human rights and freedoms, humanizing social environment and the human personality, the strengthening of solidarity and humanity among people and respect for human dignity" and to build relationships between people in the direction of creating conditions for the elimination of coercion and to the awareness of common interests.
10. The basis of the interpretation of the Constitution and laws of the principles of socialist self-management expressed in the introduction to the Constitution of the Yugoslav Republic.

== Right to self-determination ==
Previous constitutions had granted the republics the constitutional right to self-determination, including a right to secede. In the 1974 Constitution, these rights belonged to the "nations of Yugoslavia." At the same time, the constitution included a number of provisions that could deny the right to secede. Article 5 required the consent of all republics and provinces before the borders of Yugoslavia could be altered. Article 283 gave the Yugoslav Assembly the power to determine alterations in the state's boundaries. It was not clearly defined whether unilateral secession was possible or whether this could only be done if the federal government and all of the republics and provinces agreed to it.

== The end of the Constitution ==
Out of all constituencies, the SR Serbia had the most comments on the state organization under the 1974 Constitution, which was natural given its territorial structure. Initially, it requested the federal government to convince the province to properly interpret the Constitution, according to which Serbia was still a sovereign republic with an appropriate degree of autonomy for its provinces. However, after Kardelj's (1979) and Tito's death (1980) it was more and more difficult to arbitrate in disputes between the republics and provinces. In the mid-1980s, the Serbian leadership was requesting amendments to the Constitution, no longer only correct interpretation. In early 1987, thanks to the efforts of the Serbian leadership, the Presidency of Yugoslavia initiated the adoption of more than 130 amendments. However, some time later, there was a conflict within the Serbian leadership. At the eighth session of the Central Committee of the League of Communists of Serbia in September 1987, the ideas of Slobodan Milošević won, who energetically and strongly demanded the repeal of the Constitution of 1974. At the end of 1988 there was a shift of complete leadership in both provinces, and in the spring of 1989 amendments to the Constitution of Serbia were adopted, which significantly narrowed the powers and rights of the provinces. The final repeal of the constitutional provisions of 1974 in Serbia took place in September 1990, when it adopted a brand new constitution.

In the meantime, the other Yugoslav republics had started removing the 1974 constitution. Slovenia first removed the prefix "socialist" from the name of the republic in March 1990, and at the same time adopted a series of amendments that removed the socialist arrangement. In Croatia, after the victory of the HDZ (Franjo Tuđman), adopted amendments in 1990 which also removed the prefix "socialist" and changed the republic symbols as well. In December 1990 Croatia adopted a brand new constitution. Bosnia and Herzegovina and Macedonia followed in the autumn of 1990, when the anti-communist forces removed the socialist system as well, and in Montenegro the removal was formally marked by the adoption of the new republic constitution in the autumn of 1992.
