= Narrow-gauge railways in Croatia =

There are currently no operational narrow-gauge railway lines in Croatia. In some cities there are still metre-gauge tram networks.

== Metre gauge 1,000 mm (3 ft 3 3/8 in) ==
Osijek–Donji Miholjac, 51 km, closed 1970.

== Bosnian gauge 760 mm (2 ft 5 15/16 in) ==
- Parenzana railway, Trieste (Italy) – Capodistria–Koper (Slovenia)–Parenzo (Poreč, Croatia). Dismantled, in formerly Italian territory. Single track, 122,88 km.
- Samoborček railway, Zagreb–Samobor via Podsused. Single track, 19 km. Later extended to Bregana, now dismantled.
- The former Steinbeis railway starting in Knin and crossed the border to Bosnia and Herzegovina, replaced with the standard-gauge "Unska pruga" route in 1948.
- Sinjska rera railway, Split–Sinj, dismantled 1963
- Railway from Gabela to Zelenika
  - Branch: Uskoplje–Dubrovnik–Gruž

== Decauville 600 mm (1 ft 11 5/8 in) ==
- Raša (Štalije)–Mine, single track, ~ 7 km
- Plomin Luka to mine, single track, ~12 km

== Metre-gauge trams ==
Current

- Osijek tram system
- Zagreb Tramway

Former

- Dubrovnik tram
- Opatija tram
- Trams in Pula
- Trams in Rijeka
