= List of town tramway systems in Croatia =

This is a list of town tramway systems in Croatia. It includes all tram systems in Croatia, past and present; cities with currently operating systems, and those systems themselves, are indicated in bold and blue background colored rows. The use of the diamond (♦) symbol indicates where there were (or are) two or more independent tram systems operating concurrently within a single metropolitan area. Those tram systems that operated on other than standard gauge track (where known) are indicated in the 'Notes' column.

Location	Tram System	Traction Type	Date (From)	Date (To)	Notes	Source
Dubrovnik	Trams in Dubrovnik	Electric	22 Dec 1910	20 Mar 1970	Gauge: 760 mm (2 ft 5 15/16 in)	
Opatija	Trams in Opatija	Electric	09 Feb 1908	31 Mar 1933	Gauge: 1,000 mm (3 ft 3 3/8 in)	
Osijek	Trams in Osijek	Horse	10 Sep 1884	31 Mar 1926	Gauge: 1,000 mm (3 ft 3 3/8 in)	
Osijek	Trams in Osijek	Electric	12 Dec 1926		Gauge: 1,000 mm (3 ft 3 3/8 in)	
Pula	Trams in Pula	Electric	24 Mar 1904	16 Jun 1934	Gauge: 1,435 mm (4 ft 8 1/2 in)	
Rijeka	Trams in Rijeka	Electric	07 Nov 1899	15 Jun 1952	Gauge: 1,000 mm (3 ft 3 3/8 in)	
♦ Zagreb	Trams in Zagreb	Horse	05 Sep 1891	1911	Gauge: 760 mm (2 ft 5 15/16 in)	
♦ Zagreb	Trams in Zagreb	Electric	18 Aug 1910		Gauge: 1,000 mm (3 ft 3 3/8 in)	
♦ Velika Gorica	Kojnača	Horse	22 Feb 1907	09 Nov 1937	Used former Zagreb horse tramcars.	
♦ Velika Gorica	Kojnača	Diesel	1907	1937	Former horse tramcars pulled by diesel locomotives after World War II.	

== See also ==
- List of town tramway systems in Europe
- List of tram and light rail transit systems
