= Trams in Opatija =

Matulji-Opatija-Lovran tram
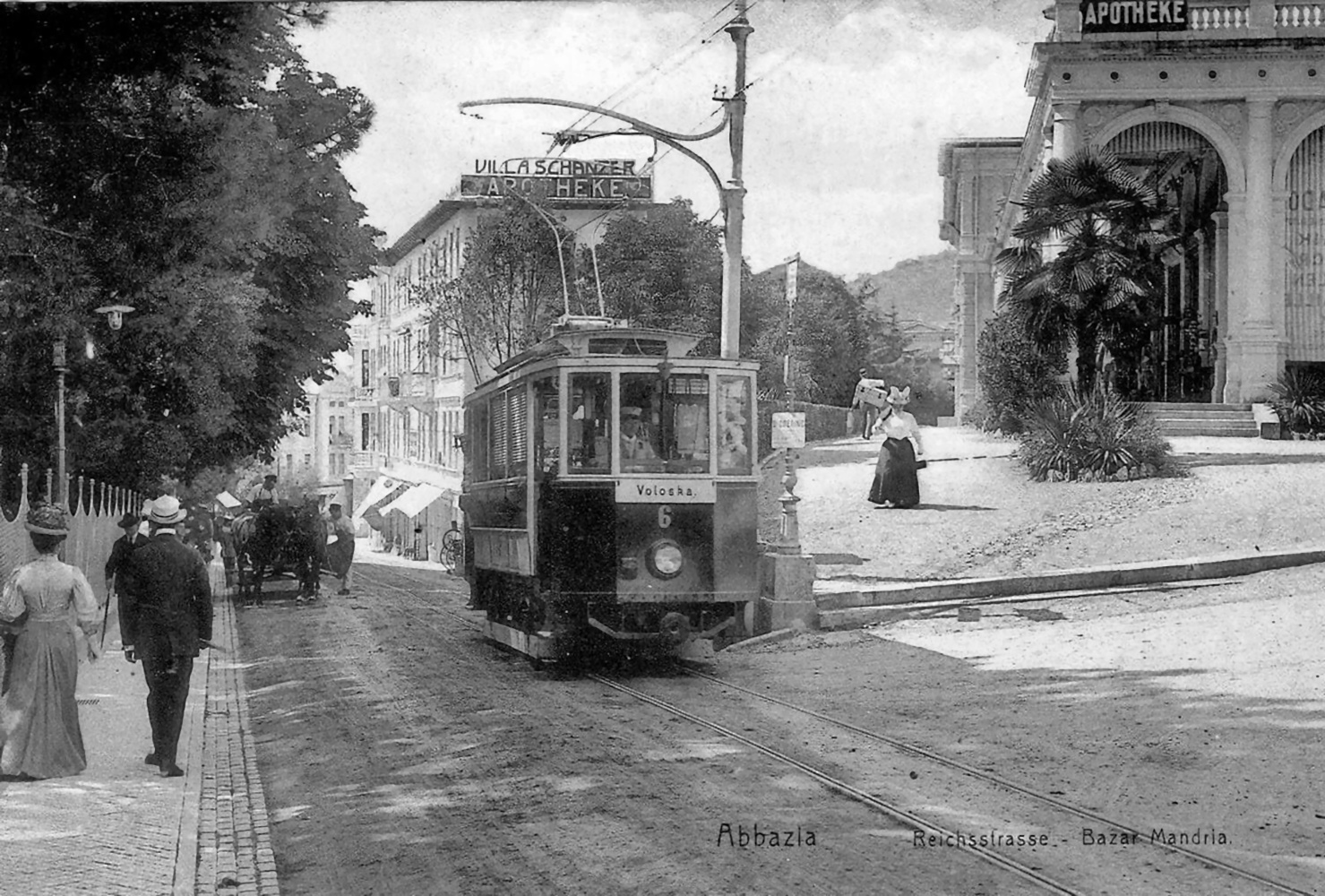

Overview
- Locale: Opatija
- Transit type: Tram
- Number of lines: 1
- Number of stations: 27

Operation
- Began operation: February 9, 1908
- Ended operation: March 31, 1933

Technical
- System length: 12 km (7.5 mi)
- Track gauge: 1,000 mm
- Electrification: 750 V DC

Trams in Opatija ran from February 1908 to March 1933, connecting the railway station in Matulji with Opatija and Lovran.

== History ==
The Opatija line was planned in 1892 as a steam driven tramway line from Matulji to Volosko, however, this concept was not accepted due to complaints by the hotel industry fearing the smoke and noise generated by steam locomotives, which would disturb their guests. The routing of the electric railway on the Matulji - Lovran route began in 1904, and the then Ministry of Railways issued a building permit for its construction in 1907. The concession for building this 12 kilometer long track was issued on February 9, 1906 and the tramway went into operation on February 9, 1908.

The tramway line was closed on March 31, 1933, and the next day the public transportation was conducted using Consorzio Intercomunale Servizi Automobilistici Fiume-Abbazia busses. The tracks were removed and taken to Sicily by ship from the port of Opatija. The tram cars were sold to Ljubljana, where they ran and were in use until 1958.

== Technical ==
The line was descending from Matulje at the elevation of 212 meters (650 feet) in Matulji to the lowest 2 meters above sea level. The tram was single-track, and bypasses were built every few kilometers, where there were also stations, of which there were a total of 27. It had 13 locomotives and five passenger cars, and used a voltage of 750 volts of direct current. Although the section from Matulji to Preluk is quite steep, the tram did not use gears to overcome the steepness, but had electromagnetic brakes with quick engagement. The tram ran daily between Matulji and Lovran from 6 a.m. to 10 p.m., departing every 15 to 20 minutes. It started from the railway station in Matulji towards the center of Matulji, its draw was at Preluk, and then went down towards Volosko, Opatija, Ičići, Ika and Lovran.

There was a tram stop in front of the town hall, and a big one at that, since trams from opposite directions passed each other there. For this purpose, the otherwise single-track railway was now double-tracked there. The luggage was transported in separate wagons. In the summer they used open wagons to carry the public through Opatija.

== Gallery ==
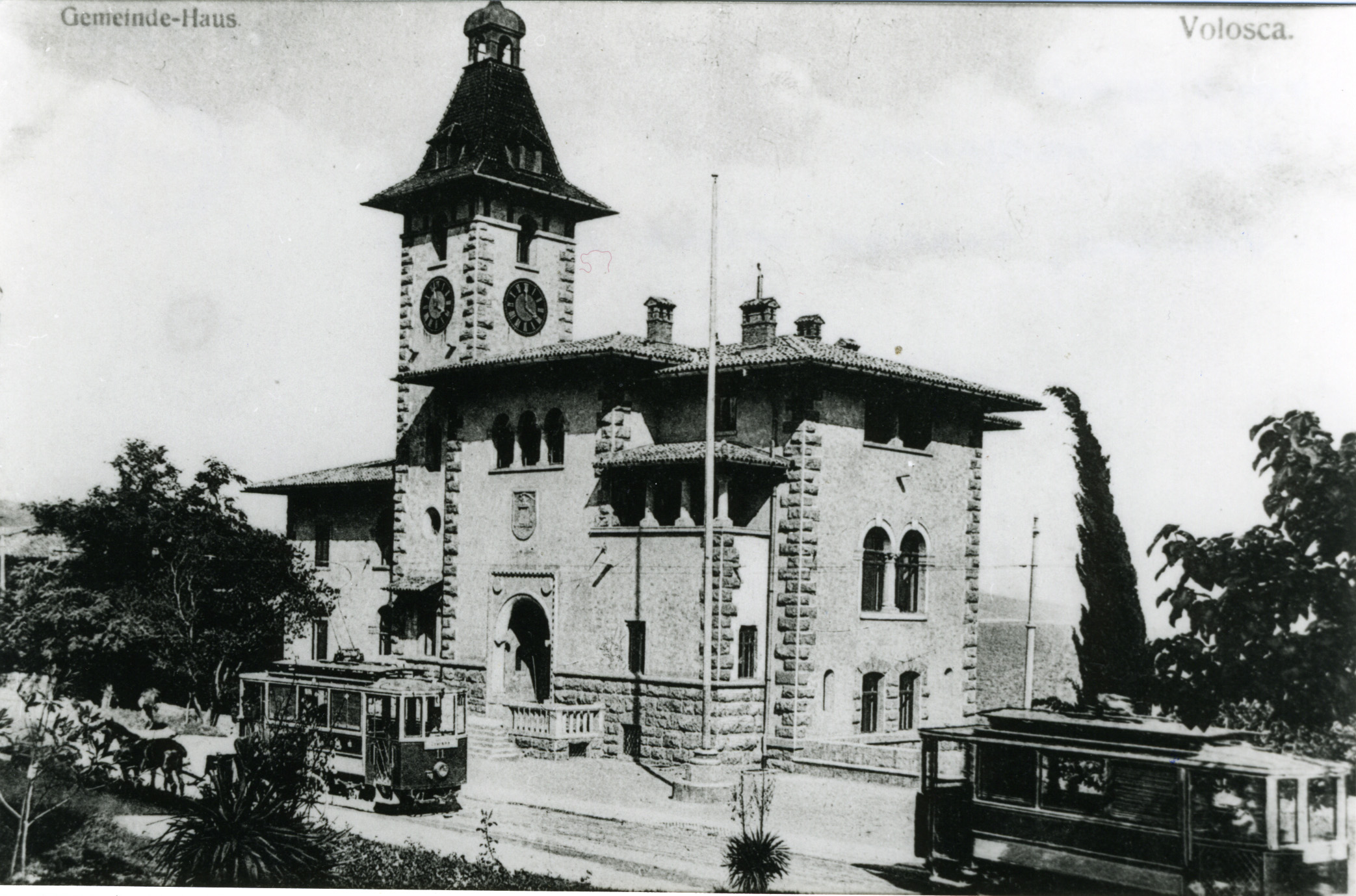

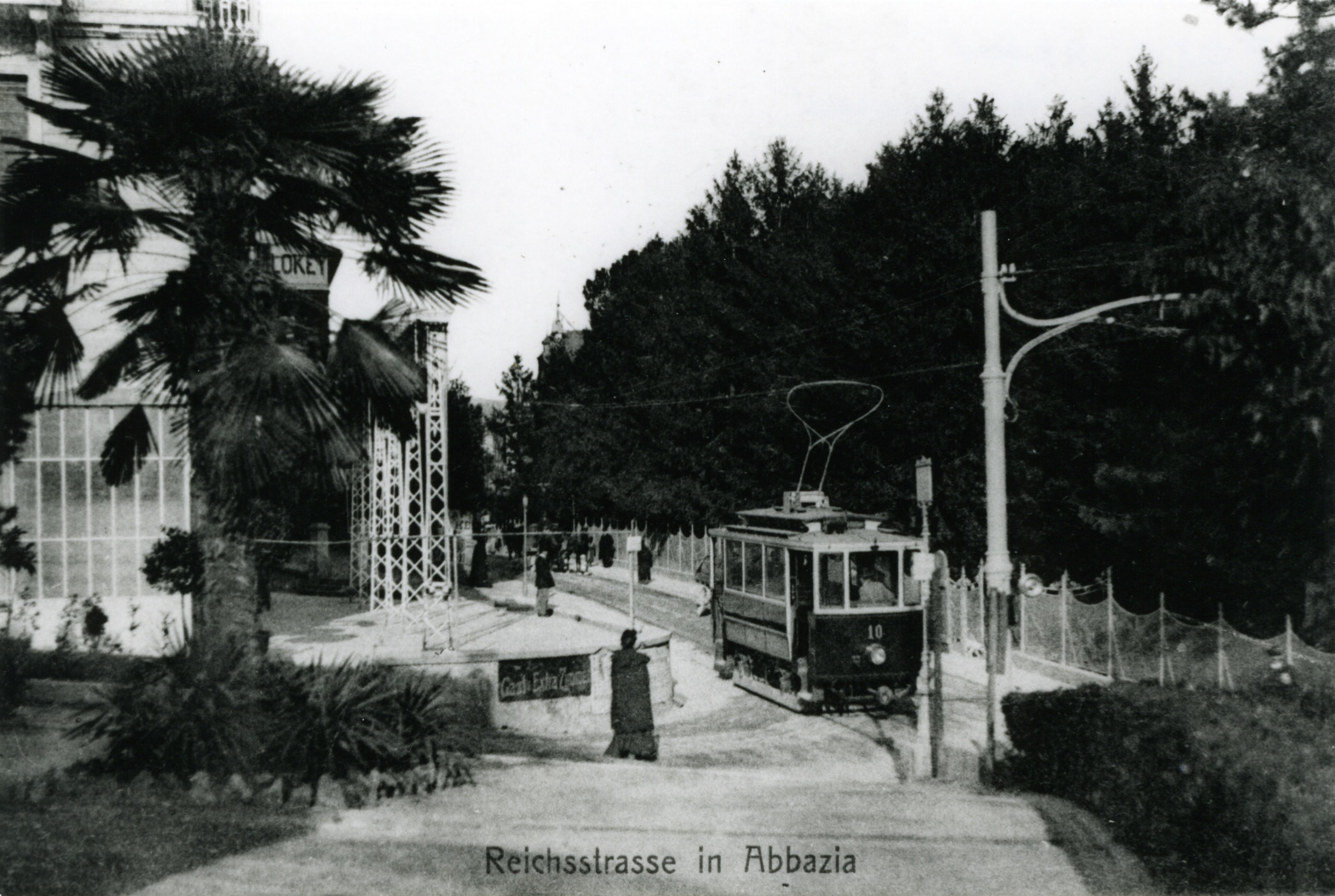

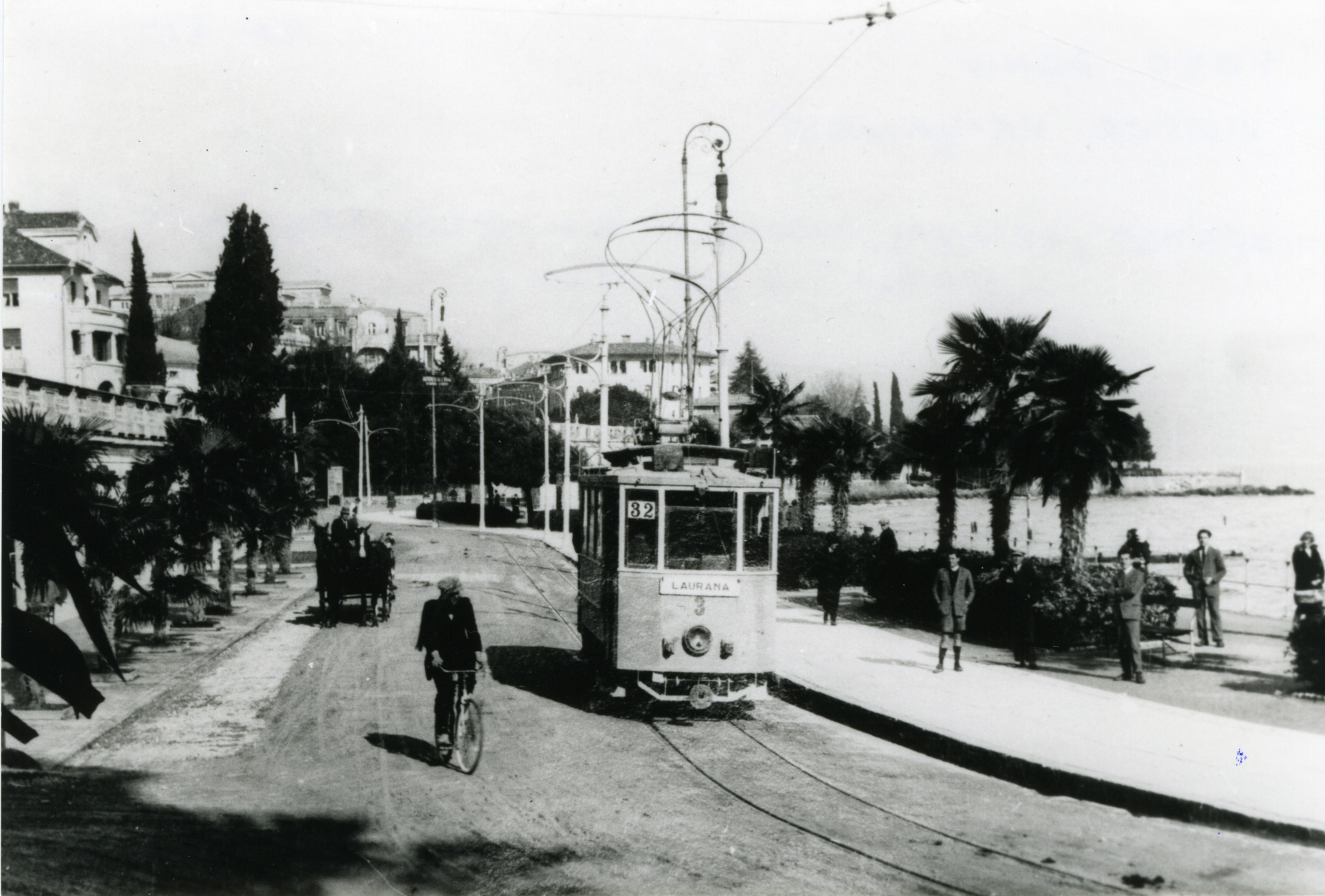

== See also ==
- List of town tramway systems in Croatia

== Sources ==
- Istria on the Internet - Tramways
- E.Oberegger, A short history of the "Lovraner Tram"(in german)
