= Trams in Pula =

Pula electric tramway
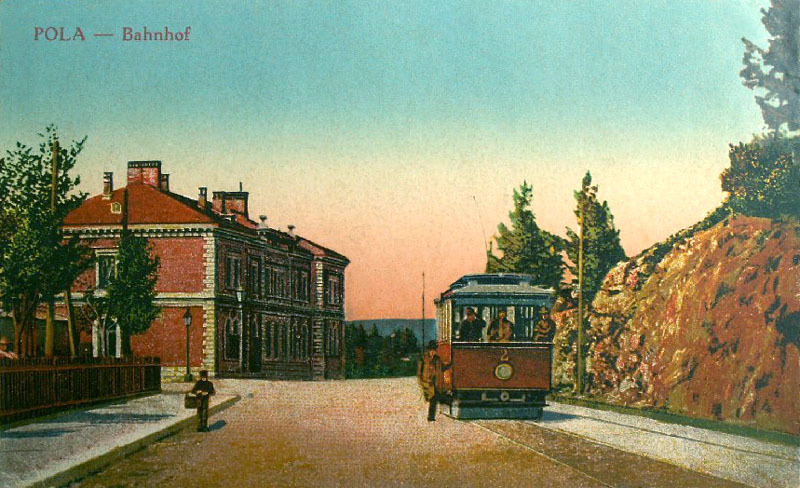

Overview
- Locale: Pula
- Transit type: Tram

Operation
- Began operation: March 24, 1904
- Ended operation: June 16, 1934

The city of Pula (Pola) had an electric tram system in the early 20th century. It was built in 1904 as a part of Pula's economic crescendo during the Austro-Hungarian rule. After World War I, under Fascist rule, the need for tram transportation declined and it was finally dismantled in 1934.

== History ==
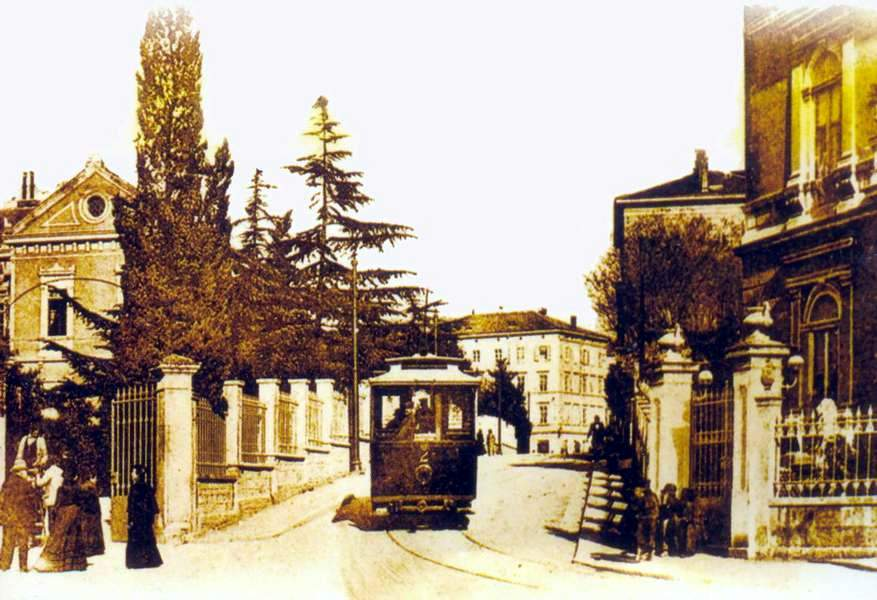
Tram on an old postcard

The trial run was completed on March 24, 1904 and regular traffic started the next day. The tracks started at the rail station. One branch traversed along the coast and Arsenal to St. Policarp where there was the depot and today there is the cement factory. The second branch passed by Marina Casino and across the center of the city along the Arena, and then again to the railroad station.

Later on a branch from Arena to Šiana forest was built. There was a plan to expand the tracks to Fažana and Vodnjan. The width of the tracks was 1435 millimeters. After World War I, the tram system was challenged by bus lines and so on June 16, 1934 the tram line was closed and public transportation was taken over by the "Gattoni" bus company.

== Modern day ==
In 2021, funds were secured for the initial phase of a new tram system in Pula which would travel roughly from the train station to Pragrande via the waterfront, including using existing infrastructure where possible.

== See also ==
- List of town tramway systems in Croatia

== Sources ==
- "O NAMA-eng | Pulapromet".
- Istria on the Internet - Tramways
