= Trams in Osijek =

Croatian tram system

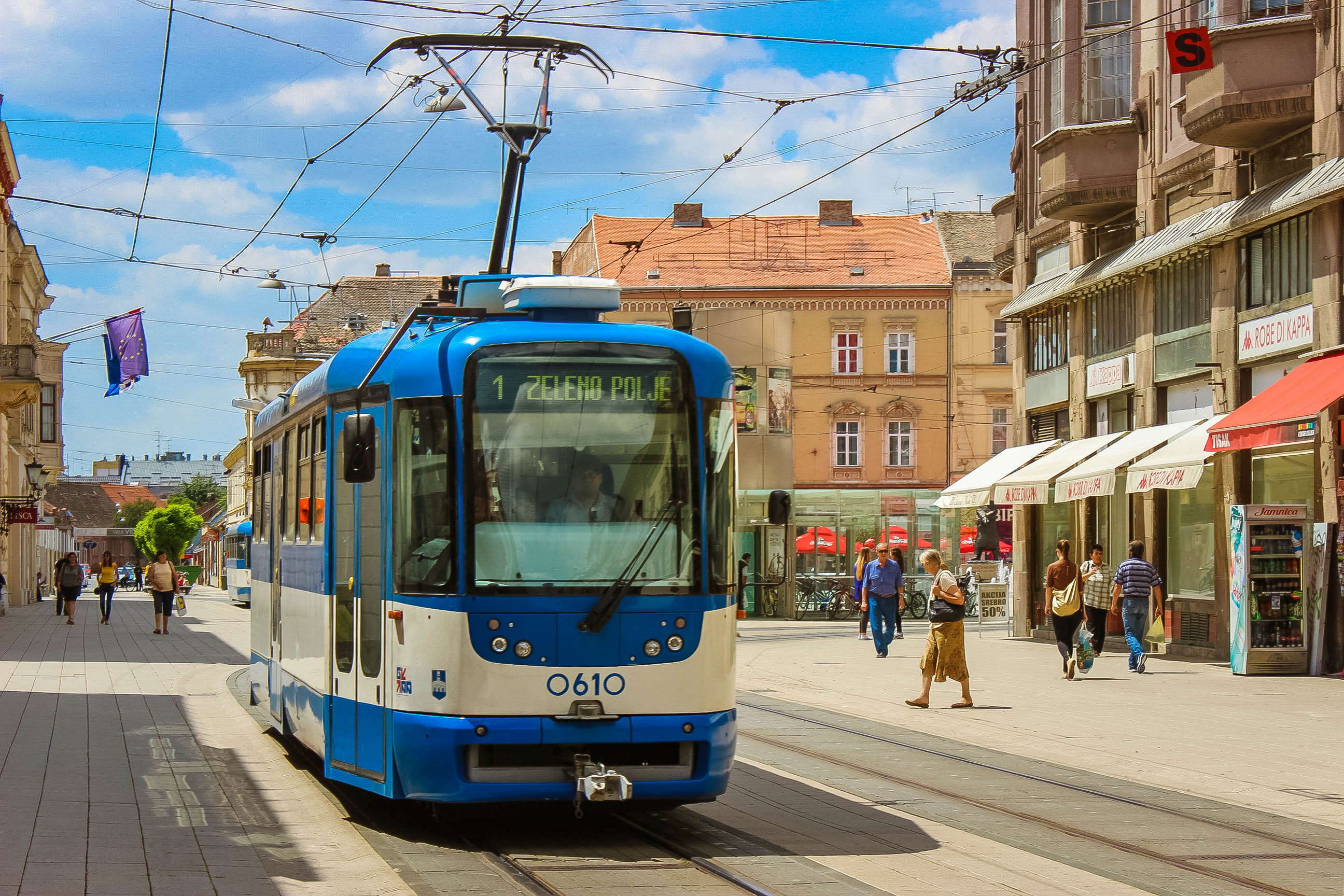

Overview
- Locale: Osijek, Croatia
- Transit type: Tram
- Number of lines: 2

Operation
- Began operation: 1884 (horse tram); 1926 (electric tram)
- Operator: Gradski prijevoz putnika Osijek

Technical
- System length: 12 km (7.5 mi), Track length: 30 km (19 mi)
- Track gauge: 1,000 mm (3 ft 3 3/8 in) metre gauge
- Electrification: 600 V DC
System map

The Osijek tram system is operated by the City Transport of Osijek (GPP Osijek) and serves the city of Osijek, capital of the Slavonia region of Croatia.

The Osijek network is the only Croatian tram system still in existence outside Zagreb. Services have operated continuously since the first horse-car tram line was opened in 1884 (connecting the railway station and city square), and the first electric tram ran in 1926.

The present network consists of two lines which intersect in the city square (Trg Ante Starčevića) and the fleet consists of refurbished Tatra T3 PVO vehicles and some newly acquired second hand Duewag GT6. During the Croatian War of Independence, five Tatra T3 streetcars were destroyed and two female drivers were killed in 1991/92.

There is also an old Škoda tourist heritage tram, which can be rented for special occasions. The tram dates back to the start of electrical operation, back in 1926.

All tracks are at 1000 mm (metre gauge) width. There are three terminal loops, and two loops used rarely only when shorter route service is provided. There is also an inner city loop for the part of line 2, which connects the main railway station with the city centre. Unlike line 1, which is double track in its whole length, line 2 is composed of a loop segment, a double track segment and the remainder being single track with passing loops. At the main vehicle depot (Remiza) there is a track triangle structure used regularly for turning tramway vehicles when starting or ending service.

In November 2014, Line 1 was extended from Višnjevac Sjever to Višnjevac Okretište.

A 2018 reorganization of public transport, which abolished the tariff union between GPP and the private transport operators, reintroduced the city centre circulator, connecting the main square and the city's railway station. Popularly known as the "Kolodvorac" (lit. Station-runner), the line previously existed until 2008, when it was abolished. However, this line was removed again on 15 April 2019 due to a low amount of passengers and a bad time organisation with Line 2.

In September 2023, GPP Osijek ordered 10 new low-floor trams from Končar; the deal was for 25 million euros.

== Lines ==
- Line 1: Višnjevac - Trg Ante Starčevića - Zeleno polje
- Line 2: Trg Ante Starčevića - Bikara - Kolodvor - Trg Ante Starčevića

== Fleet ==
Image	Type	Since	Current	Original	Note
Tatra T3PV.O	Tatra T3PV.O	2006	16	17	
TMK 2500	TMK 2500	2025	6	10	3 trams on delivery (7 are delivered, but 1 of them isn't in service)

== Gallery ==
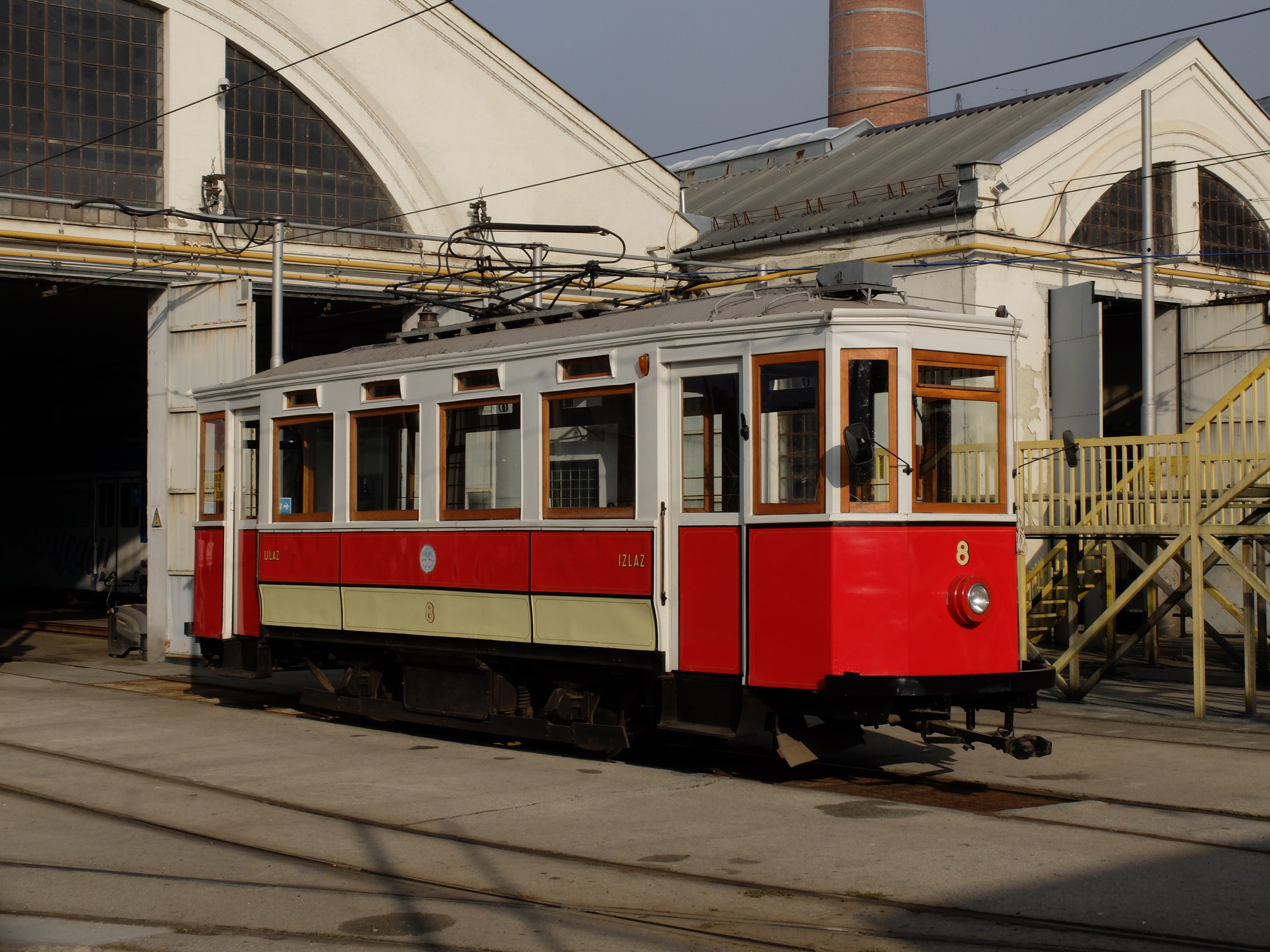
No. 8

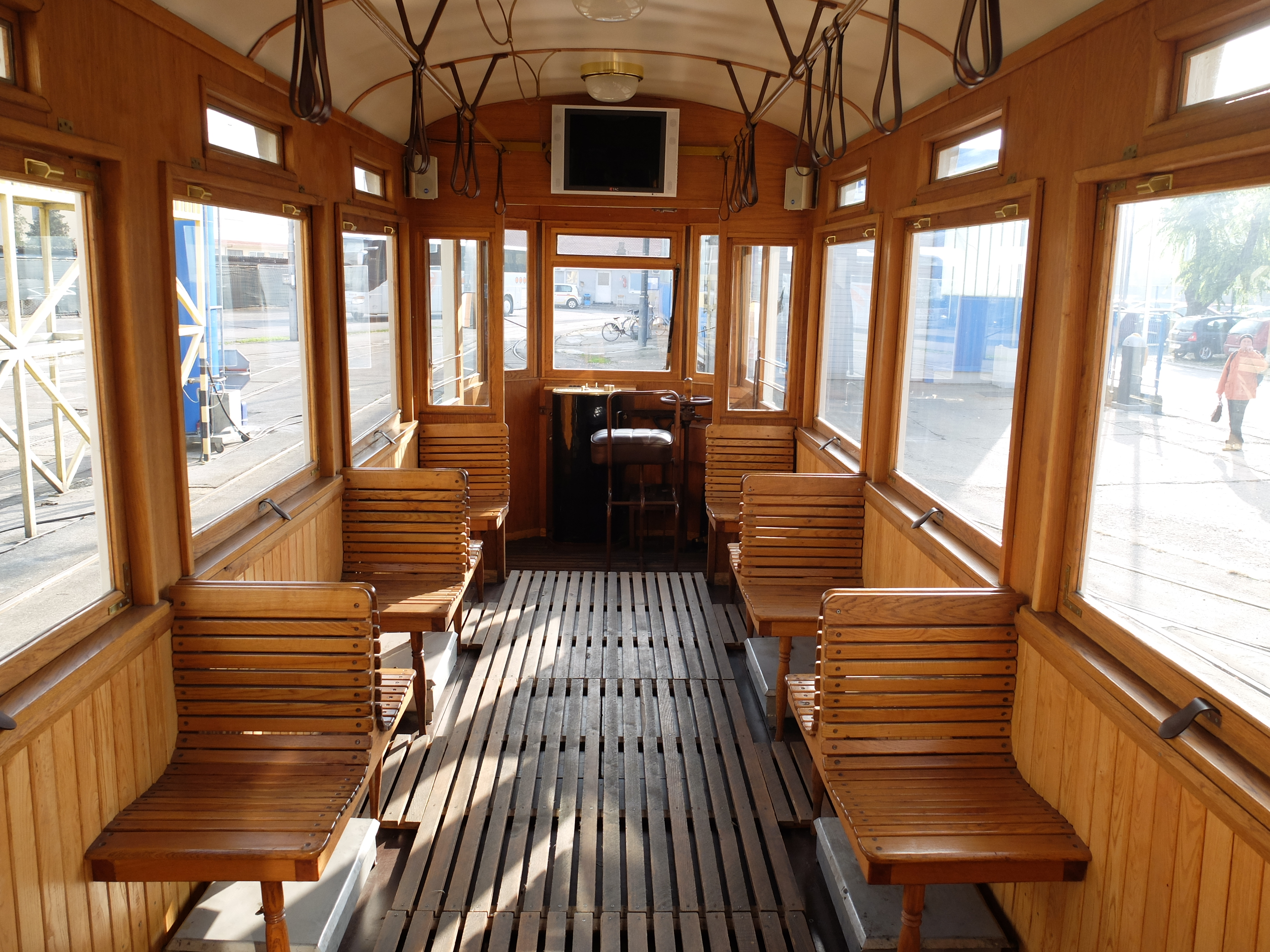
No. 8 (Passenger compartment)

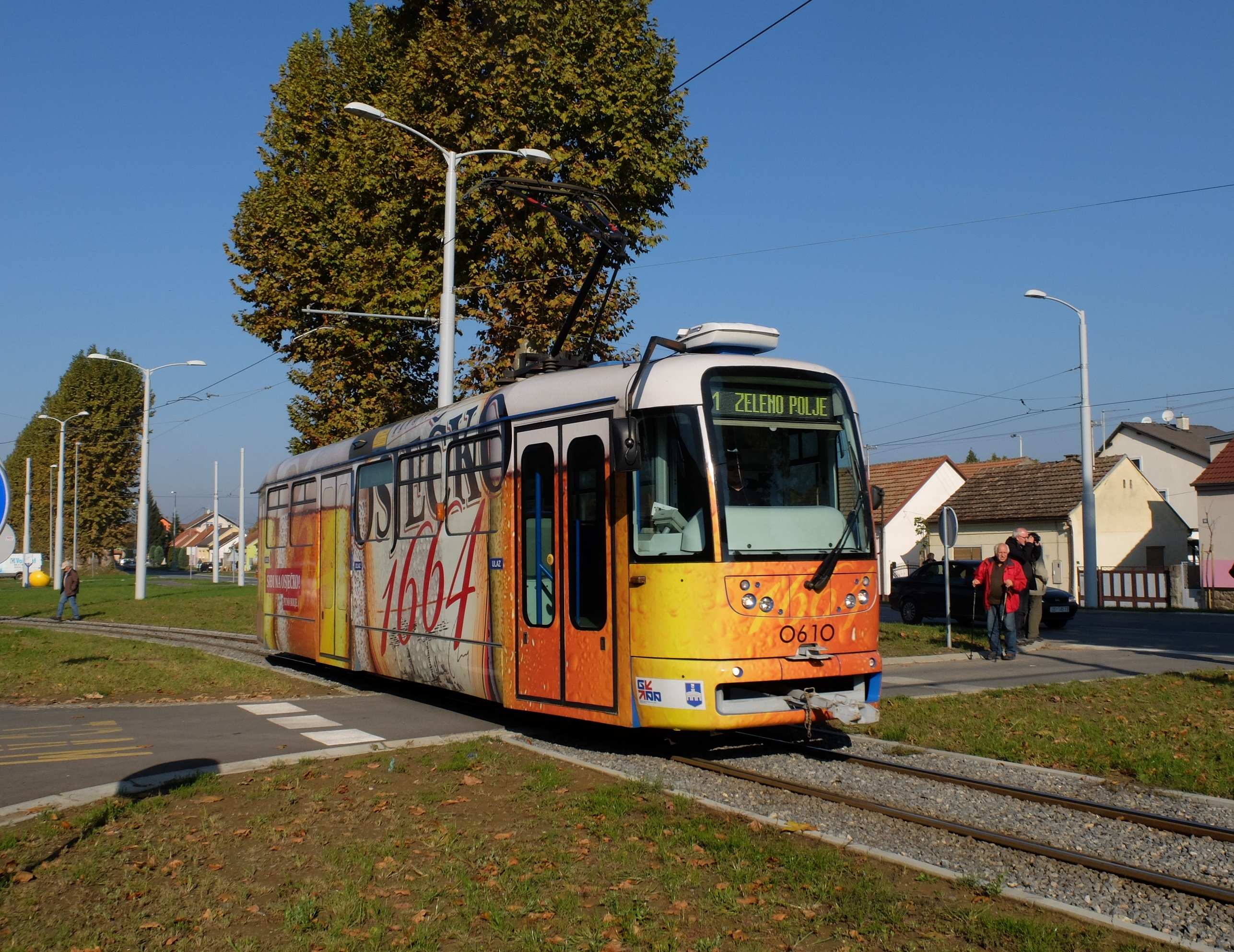
No. 0610 (T3R.PV)

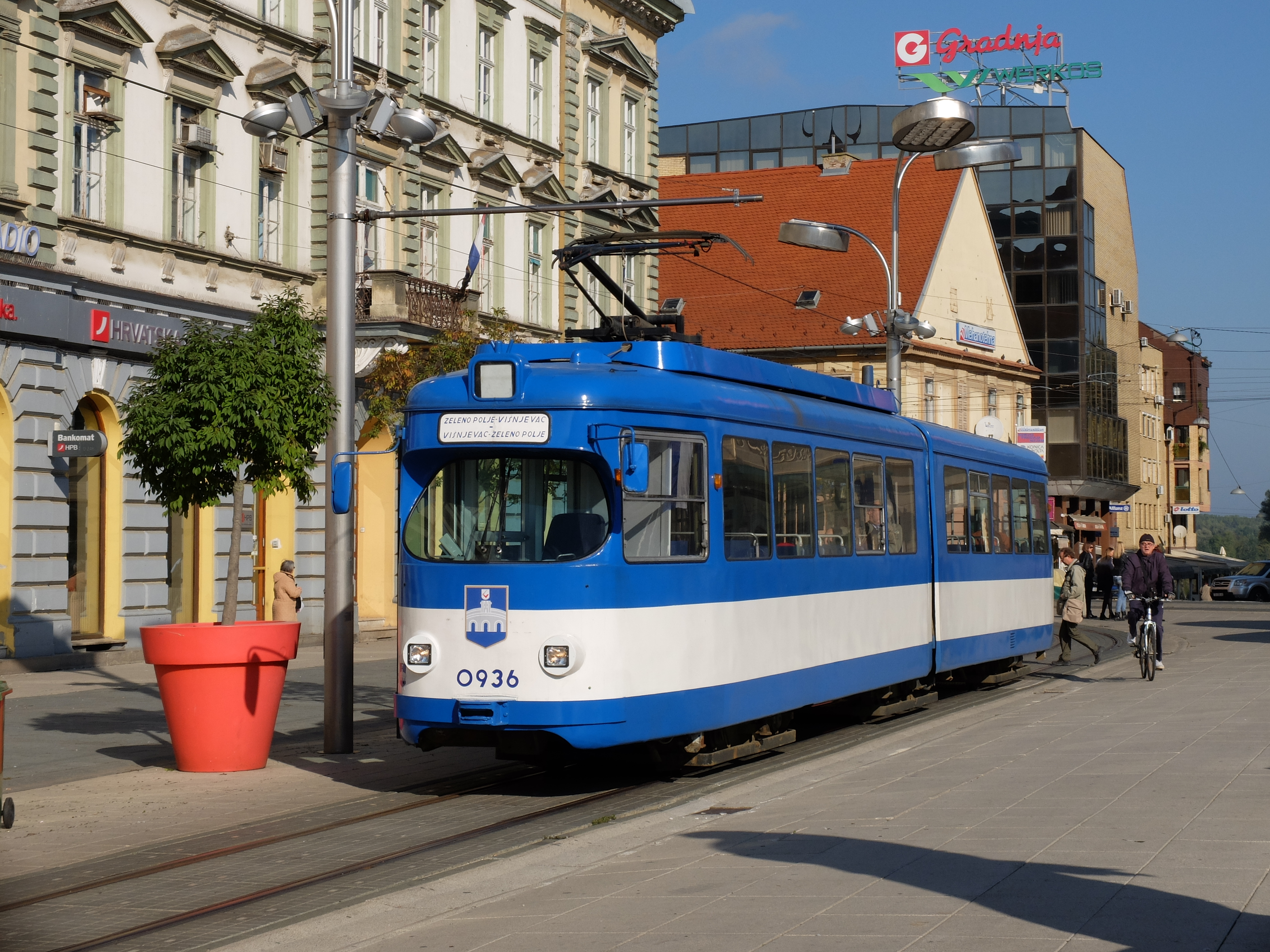
No. 0926 (GT6)

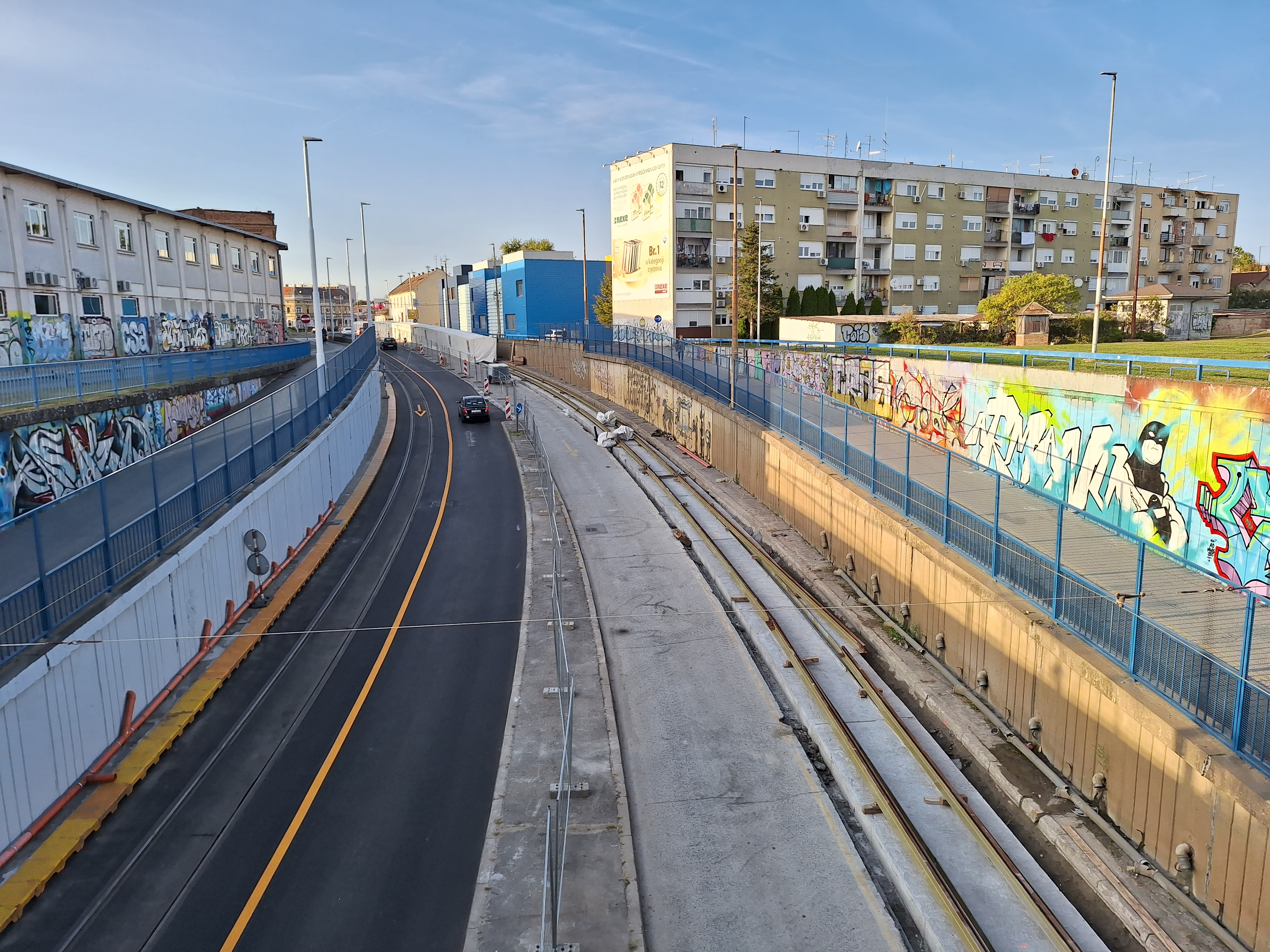
Reconstruction and modernization of the Osijek tram network, 2024.

== See also ==
- Trams in Zagreb
- List of town tramway systems in Croatia
