= Trams in Dubrovnik =

Public transit system in Croatian city

Dubrovnik tram
- Dubrovnik tram in 1968

Overview
- Locale: Dubrovnik, Croatia
- Transit type: Tram

Operation
- Began operation: 22 December 1910
- Ended operation: 20 March 1970

Technical
- Track gauge: 760 mm (2 ft 5 15/16 in) Bosnian gauge
System map
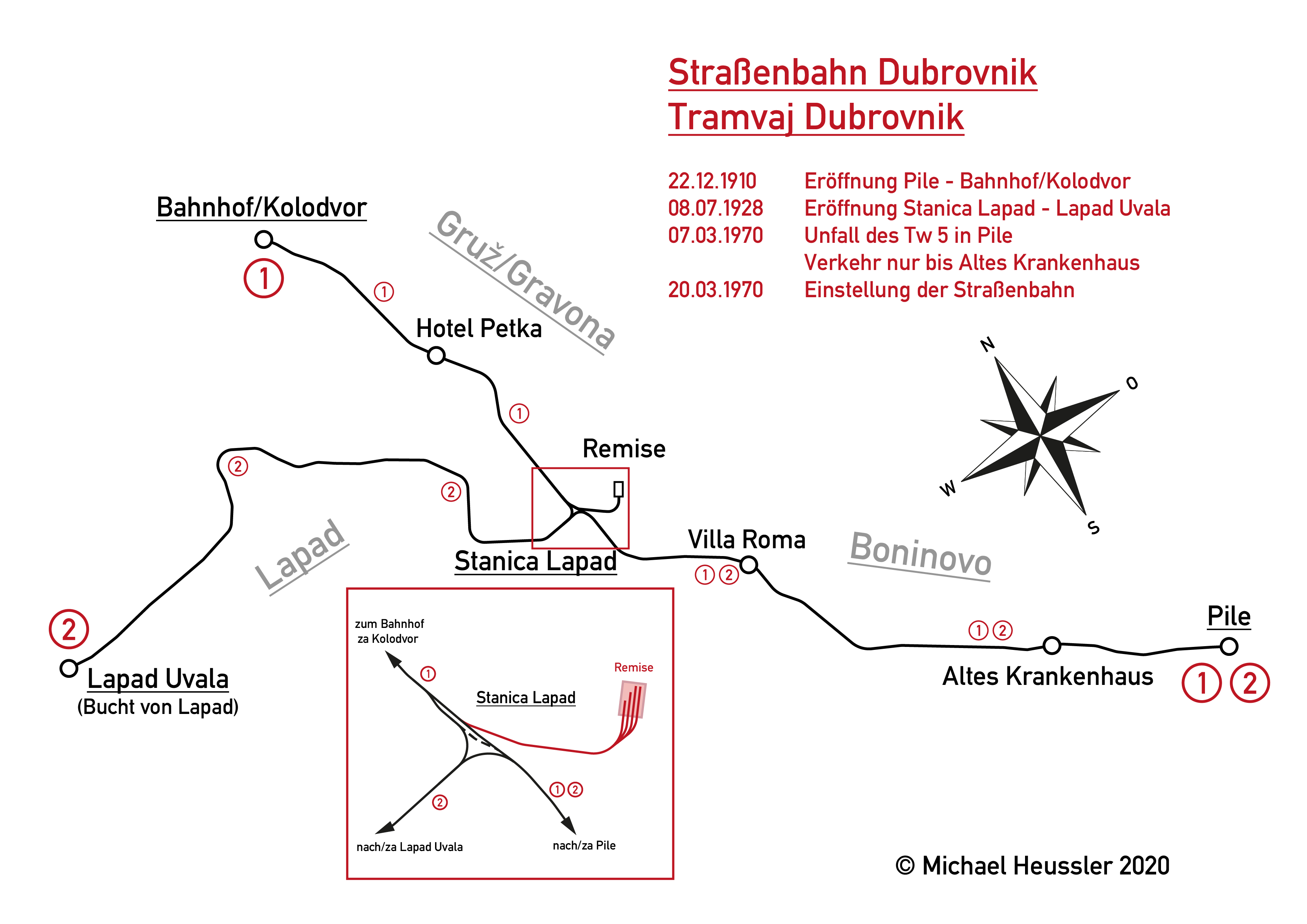
Formal map of the Dubrovnik tram network

Trams in Dubrovnik was the public transit system that operated in the Croatian city of Dubrovnik from 1910 until 1970.

== History ==
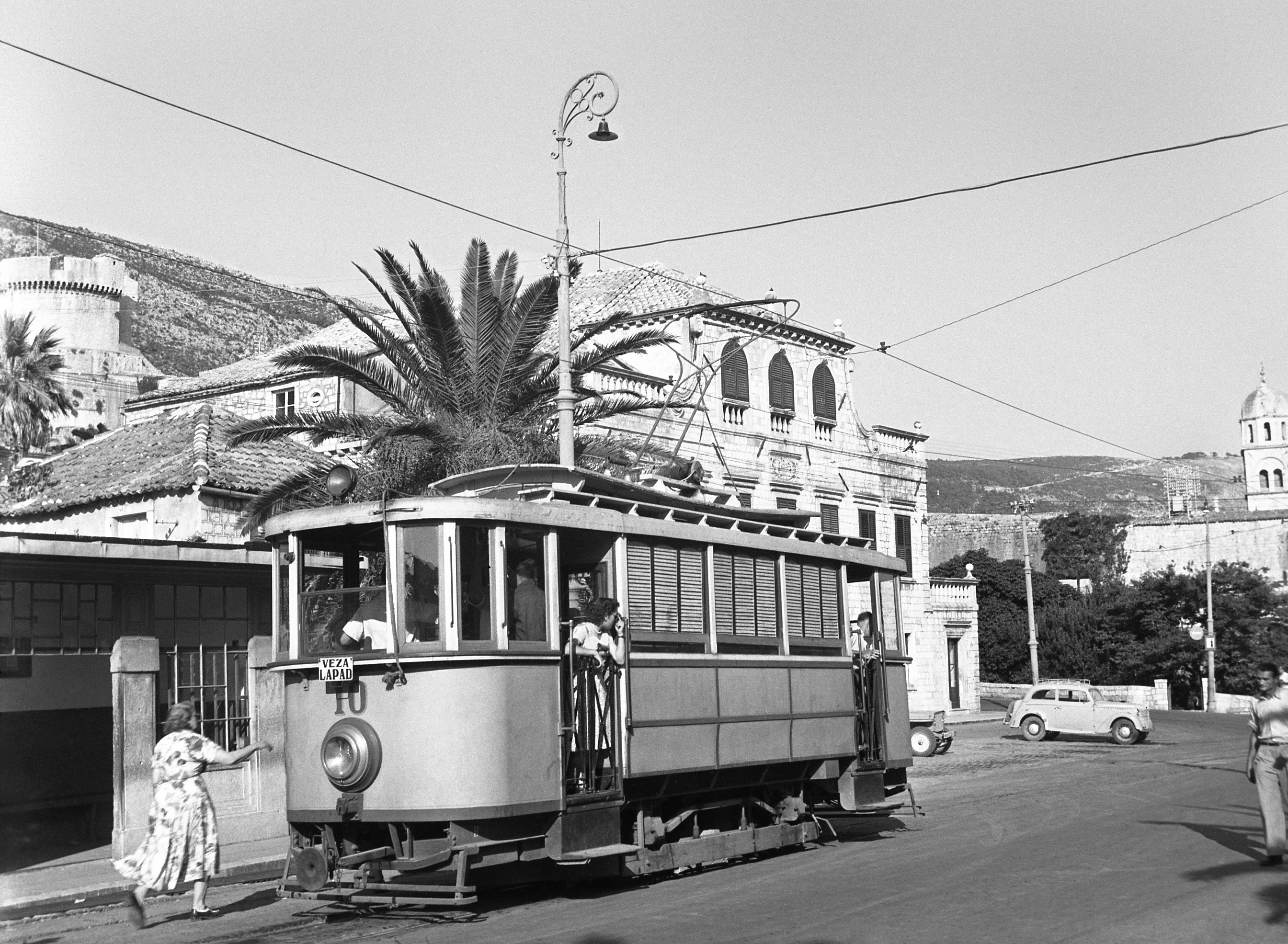
Tram No. 10 at Pile in 1952

The first tram commenced operations on 22 December 1910 between the city gates at (Pile) and nearby port of Gruž, and expanded throughout its life with an extension of the original line to the Dubrovnik railway station, and a second line to Lapad.

=== 1970 Accident and eventual closure ===
On Saturday, March 7, 1970, around 9:00 a.m., there was one of the most serious traffic accidents involving the Dubrovnik tram in the past 60 years since it appeared on the city's streets. Tram 5, which was traveling on the route Pile–Lapad, went down Maršala Tita Street at high speed to the last tram stop, where it jumped off the rails, rushed 27 meters across the road, collapsed a fence wall, and crashed from a height of four meters into the city park directly at the entrance through the walls to the old part of the city. One person died, while others were seriously injured.

The Council for National Defense and the Council for Urban Planning and Communal Affairs of the Dubrovnik Municipal Assembly adopted a resolution to abolish tram service in Dubrovnik, which had been introduced in 1910. The two councils' decision was implemented by suspending tram service and lifting the tram tracks en route from Boninovo to Pile. On April 20th at 12 noon, the tram traffic was suspended.

At exactly 12 noon, all tram cars were lined up at Lapad Station and from there, accompanied by citizens and all active and retired company employees, they set off on their last short ride to the depot. The last full day of tram service was Friday, 20 March 1970. The next morning, on the 21st, free rides were given to all as a final farewell to the old tram cars, several of which were originals from 1910. Large crowds, mostly of locals, took advantage of their last chance to ride the trams which ran a special service between Lapad and the railway station at Gruz. At noon a straggled procession was formed of the system's nine remaining vehicles that filed one by one into the depot which shut its gates without ceremony at 12:30. That was the end of the Dubrovnik trams.

Road transport services in the city are now exclusively operated by buses. The tramways carried around 100 million passengers during their six decades of existence.

== Gallery ==
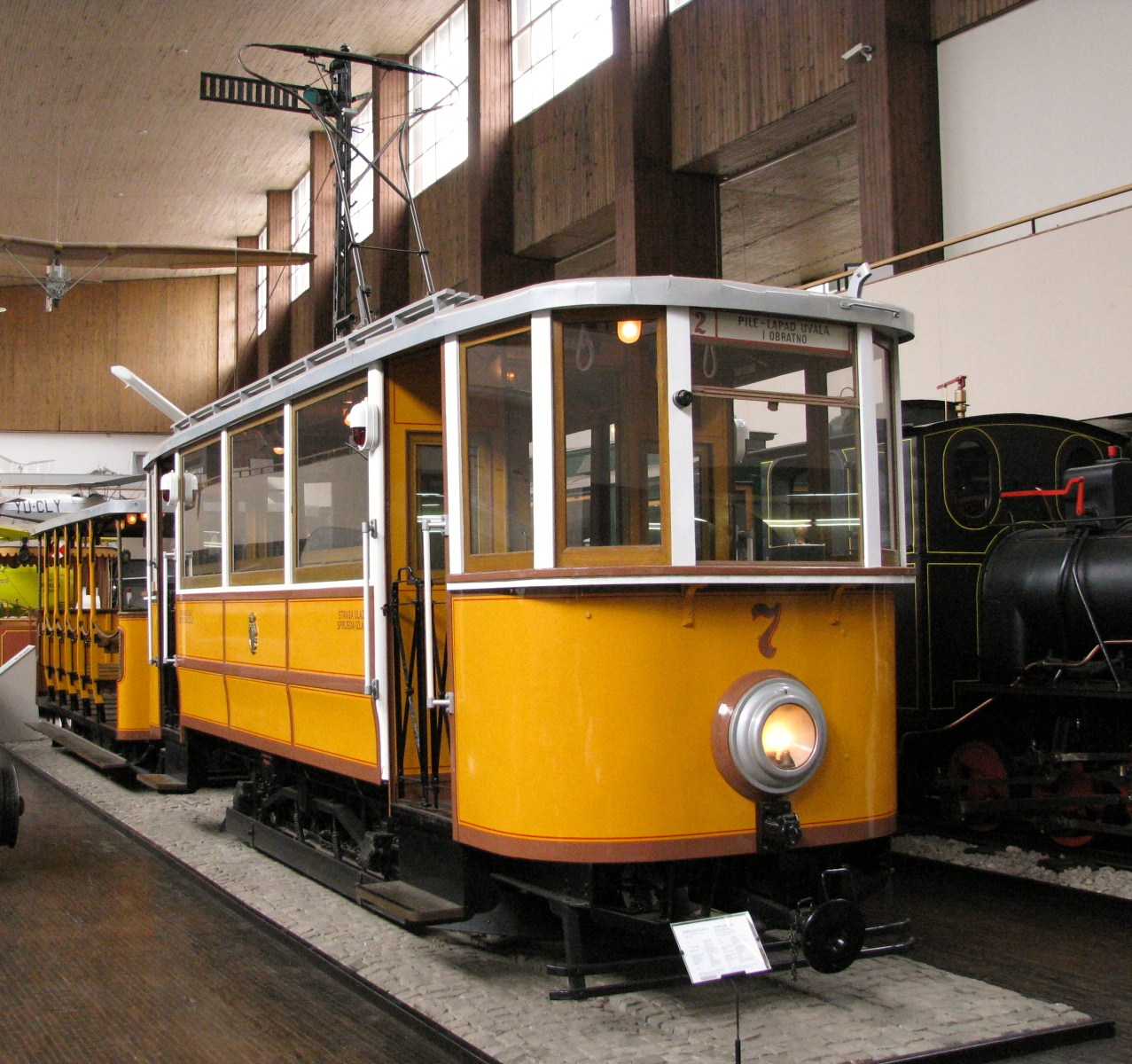
Restored Dubrovnik tram on display at the Zagreb Technical Museum

Dubrovnik tram in 1968

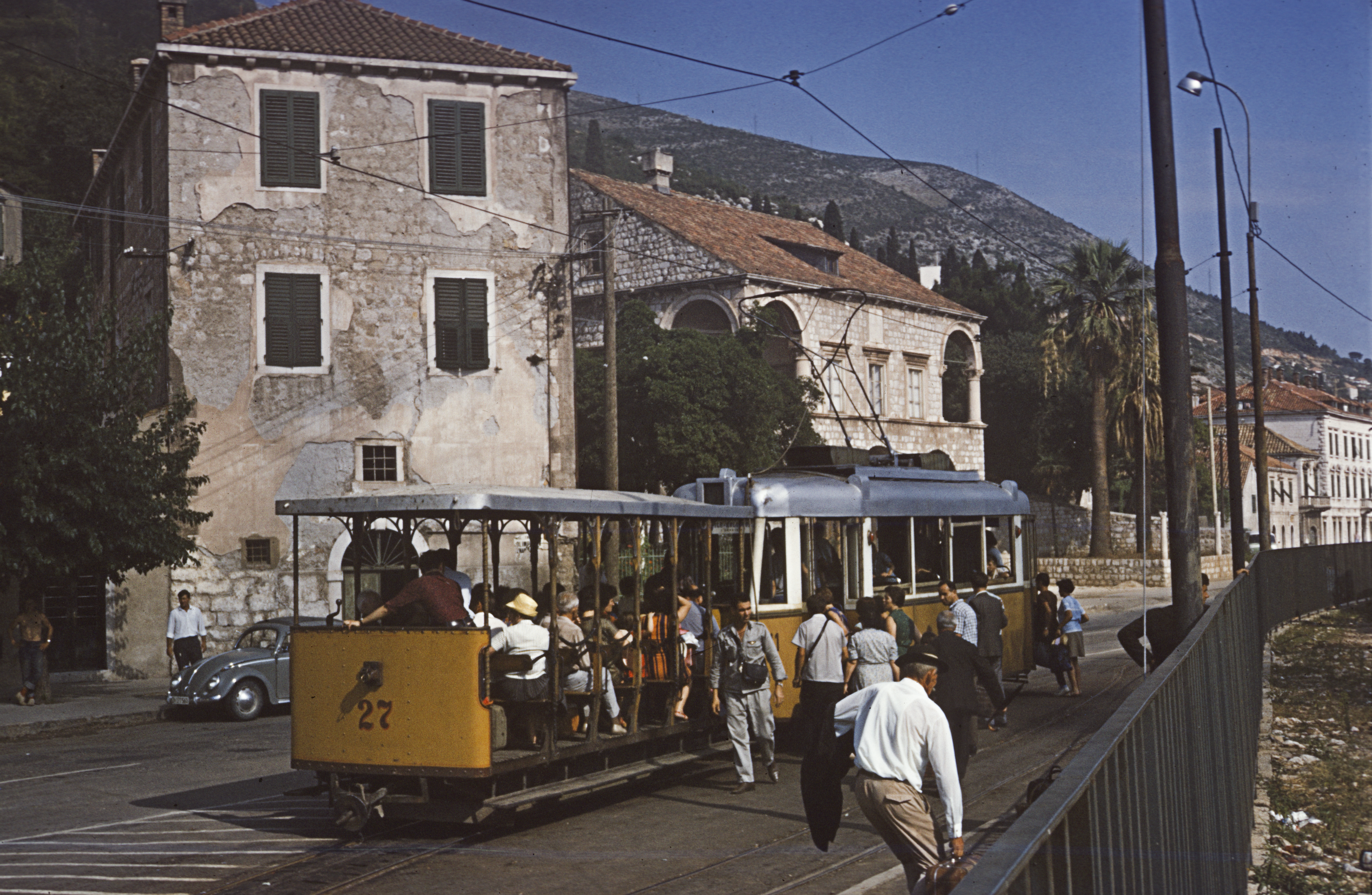
Dubrovnik tram in operation

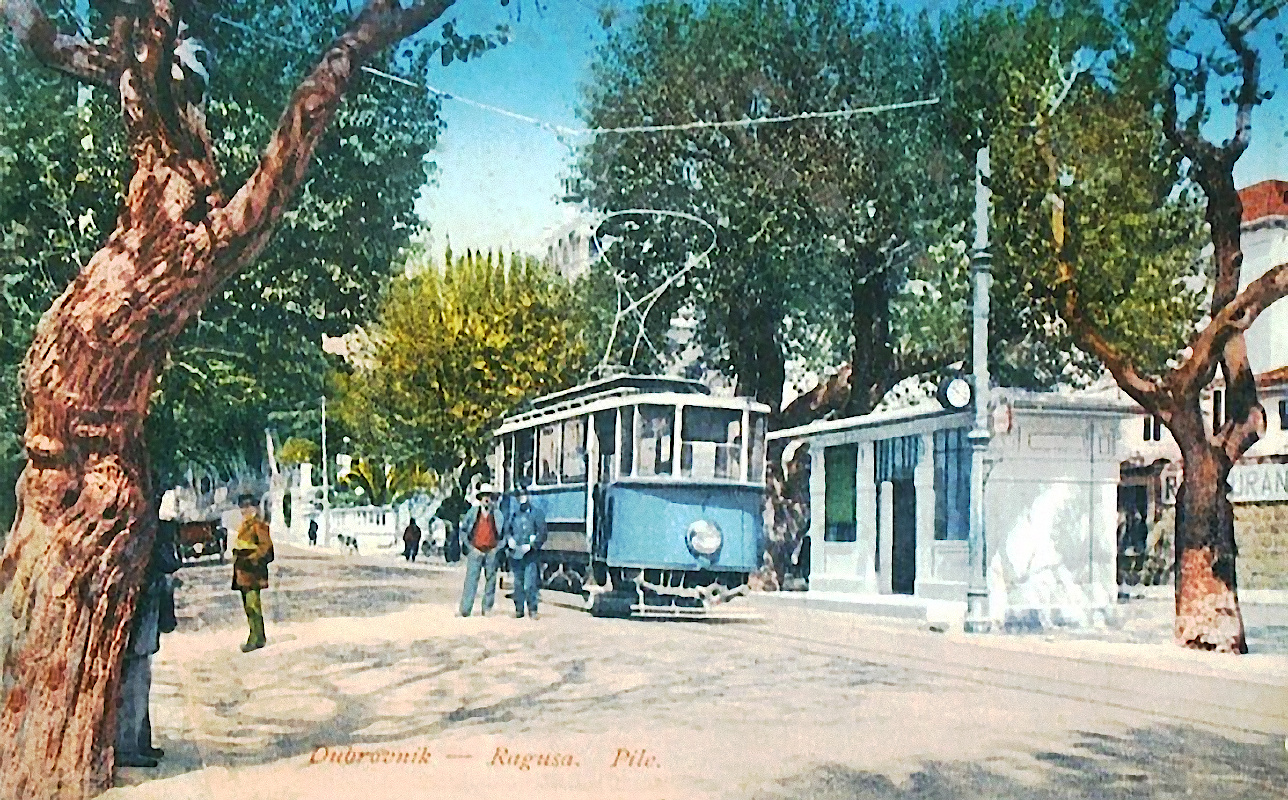
Tram at the beginning of its service, 1910

== See also ==
- List of town tramway systems in Croatia
