= Trams in Rijeka =

Rijeka tram
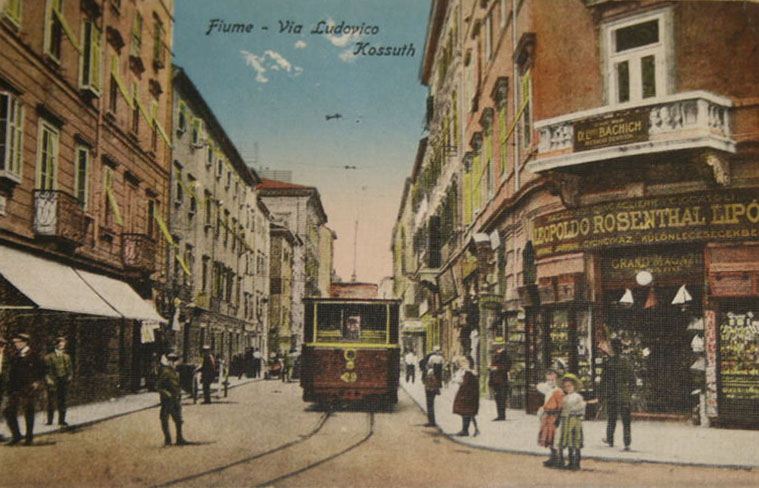

Overview
- Locale: Rijeka
- Transit type: Tram

Operation
- Began operation: November 7, 1899
- Ended operation: June 15, 1952
System map
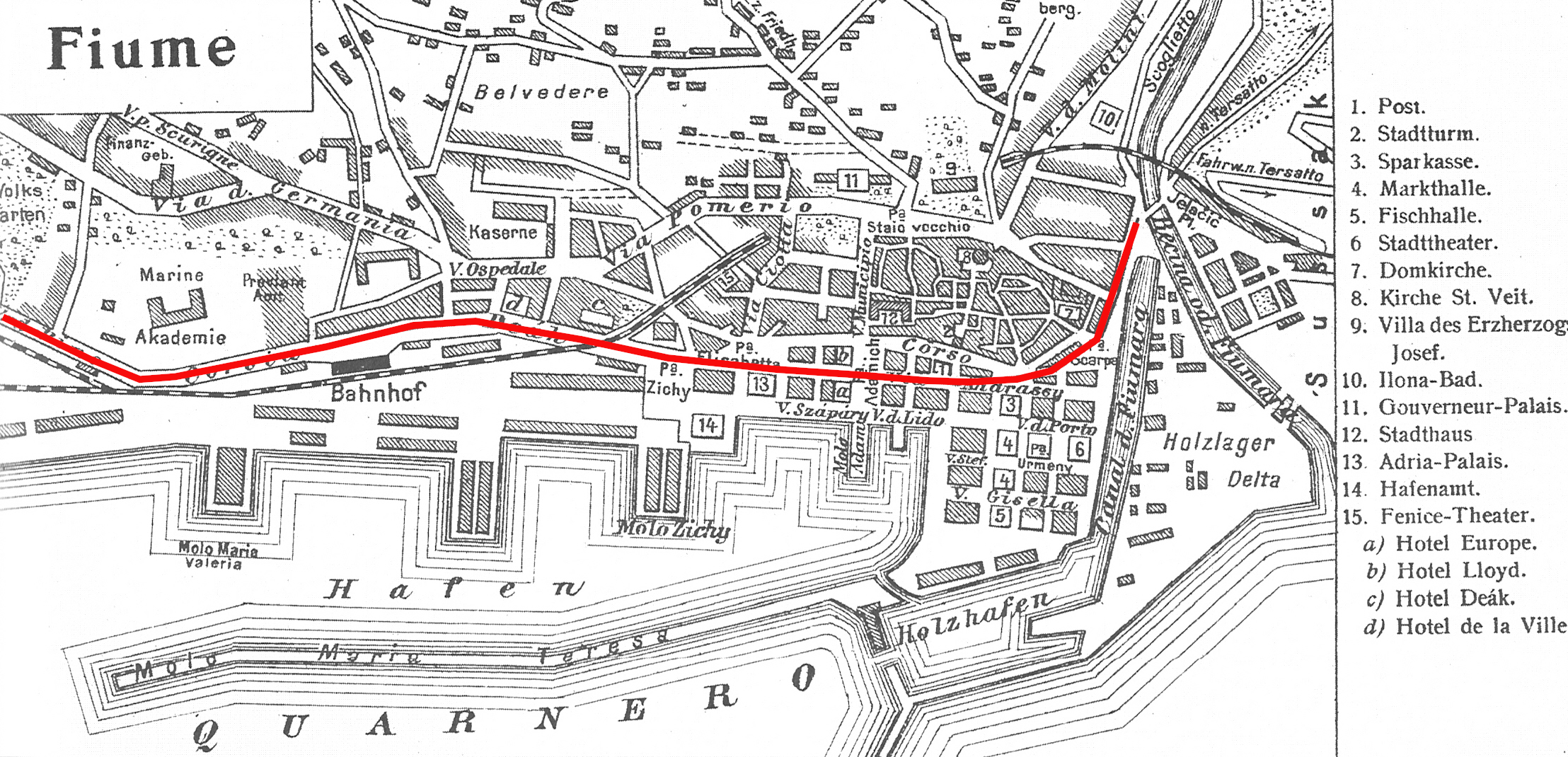
Formal map of the Rijeka tram network

Tram traffic in Rijeka (Fiume) was introduced in 1899. The first electric tram appeared on the streets of Rijeka (Fiume) on November 7, 1899, replacing horse-drawn vehicles, and thus marking the beginning of organised public transport in the town. A single-track line that was 4,400 metres long carried passengers from the bridge on Rječina to the Railway Station. Each of the eight existing trams could take twenty-eight passengers.

In 1907, the tram started to run also from Školjić to the place where today’s shipyard "3. maj" is, while three years later it went all the way to Kantrida. In 1921, the double-track line was finished.

During the Second World War it was the only means of public transport in the town. After the war new buses were acquired and they gradually took over the public transport in the town. Tram tracks that were in a poor condition became a danger for the traffic safety so that on June 15, 1952 the Rijeka tram had to be redesigned. Instead of renovation however, the city council at the time opted to install a bus system to replace it, which has served as the sole means of public transport in the city since.

== Gallery ==
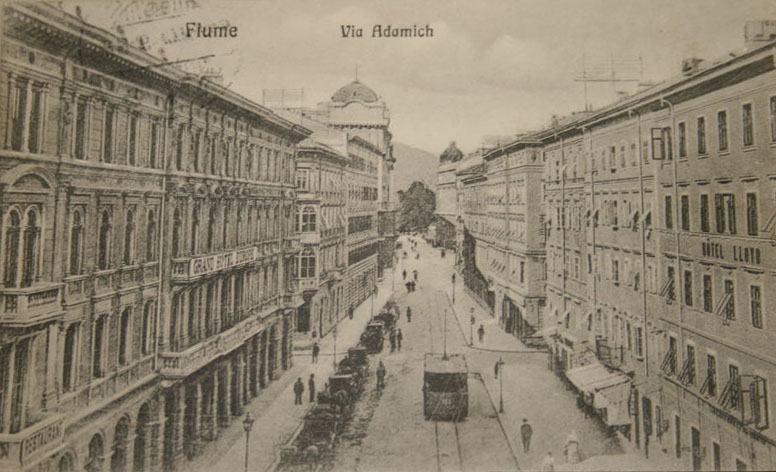

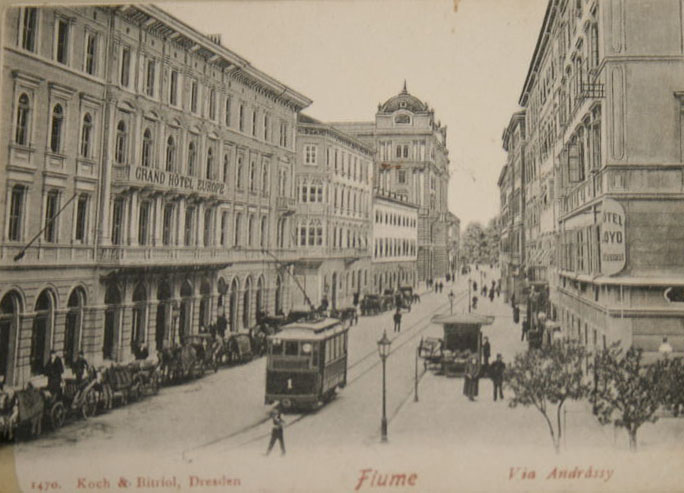

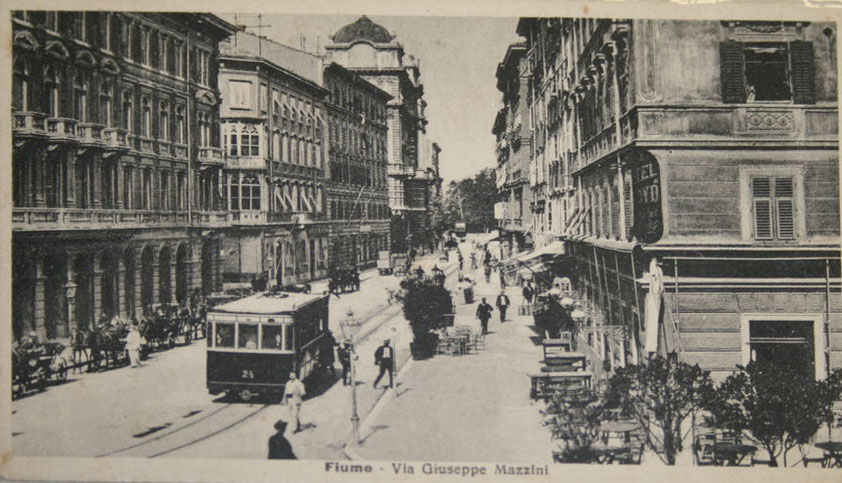

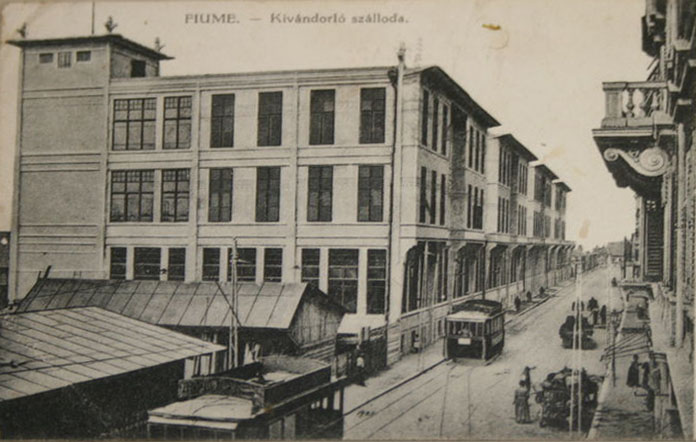

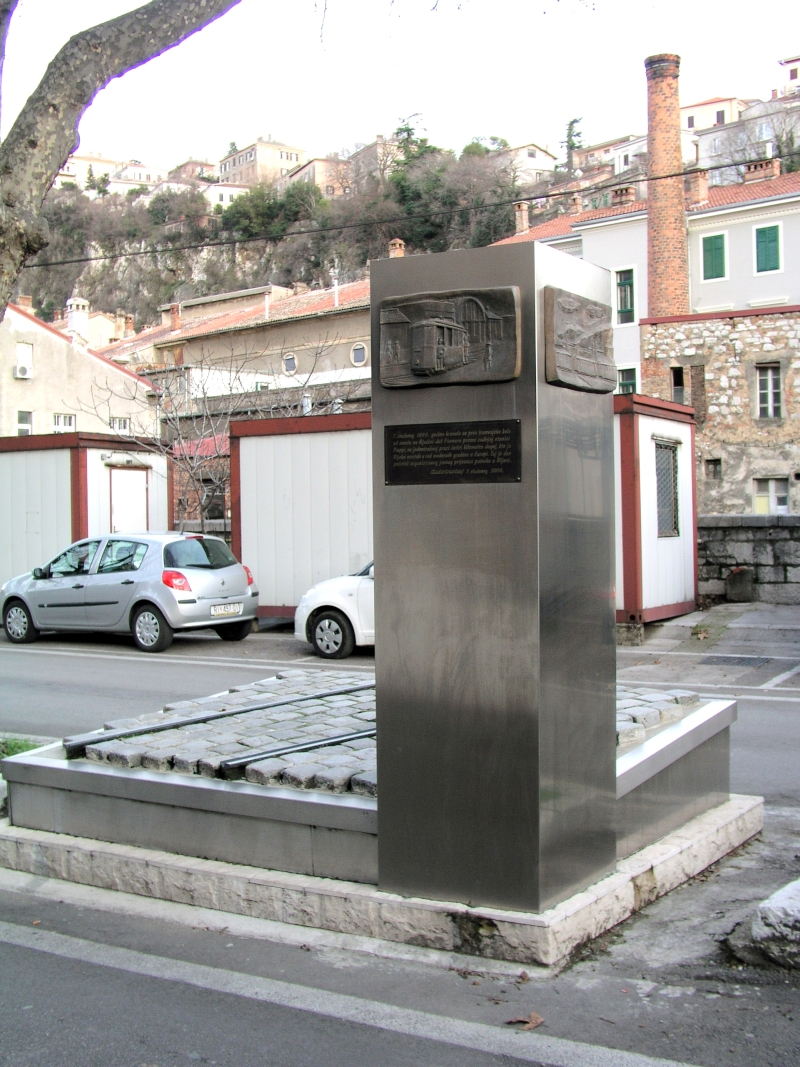
Monument commemorating the first public transport system in Rijeka.

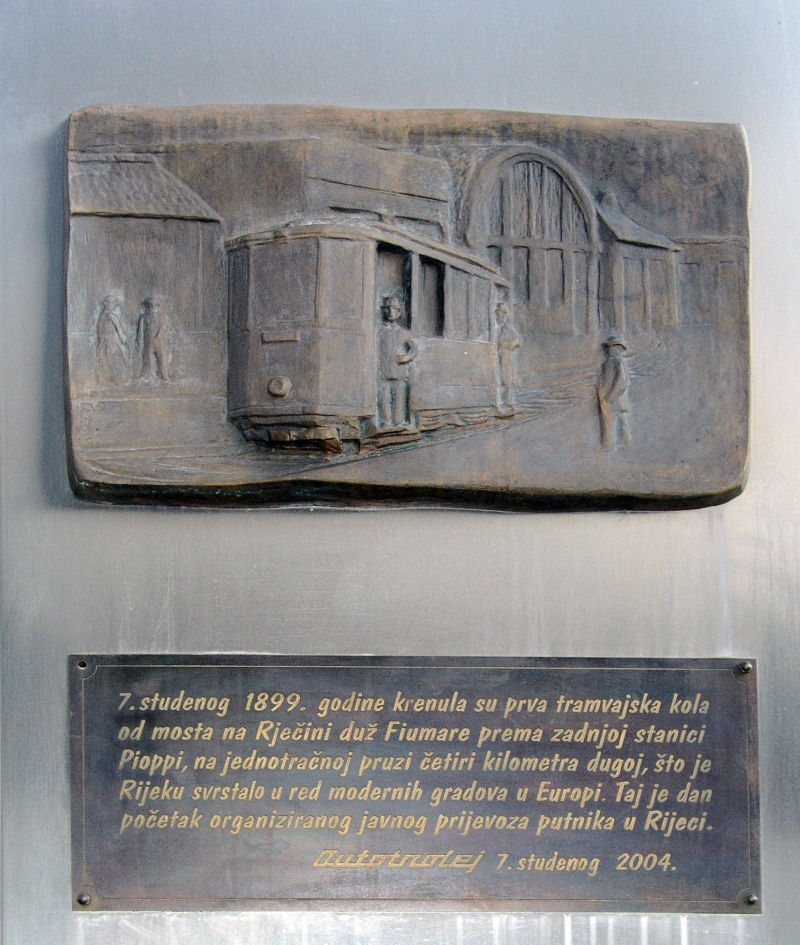
Close up of the monument.

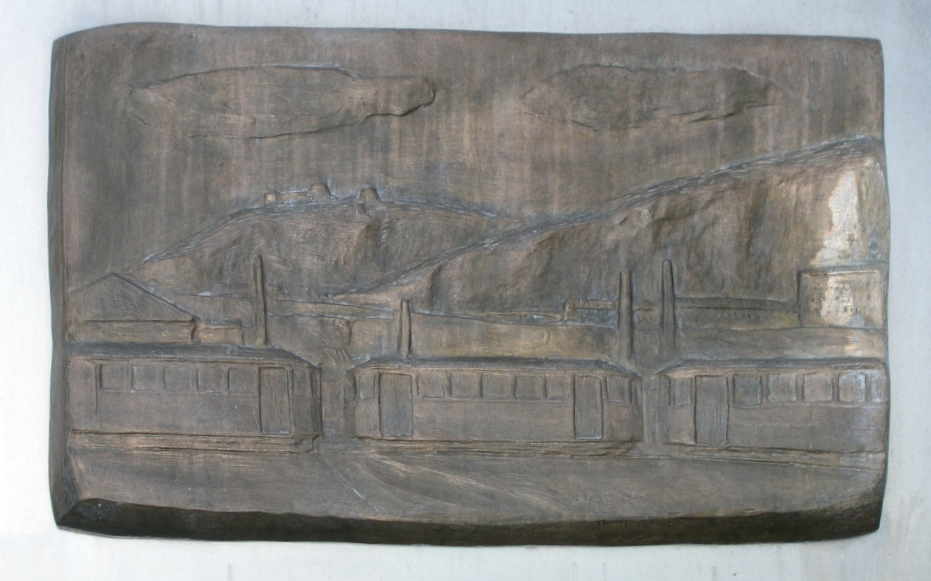
Close up of the monument.

== See also ==
- List of town tramway systems in Croatia
