= List of heads of state of Serbia =

This article lists the heads of state of Serbia, from the establishment of the modern Serbian state during the Serbian Revolution to the present day.

The list includes the heads of state of Revolutionary Serbia; the independent monarchies of Principality of Serbia and Kingdom of Serbia; the People's Republic of Serbia / Socialist Republic of Serbia, a constituent republic of the Federal People's Republic of Yugoslavia / Socialist Federal Republic of Yugoslavia; the Republic of Serbia, a constituent republic of the Federal Republic of Yugoslavia / State Union of Serbia and Montenegro; and the Republic of Serbia, an independent state.

== Monarchy ==
=== Revolutionary Serbia ===
Grand Vožd				Reign			Claim
No.	Portrait	Name (Birth–Death)	House	Reign start	Reign end	Duration	Claim
1		Karađorđe Petrović; Карађорђе Петровић (1768–1817)	Founder of the House of Karađorđević	15 February 1804	21 September 1813 (Exiled)	9 years, 218 days	Leader of the First Serbian Uprising (elected at the Orašac Assembly)

=== Principality of Serbia ===
Status: Denotes Regent

Prince				Reign			Claim
No.	Portrait	Name (Birth–Death)	House	Reign start	Reign end	Duration	Claim
1		Miloš Obrenović I Милош Обреновић I (1780–1860)	Founder of the House of Obrenović	23 April 1815	25 June 1839 (Abdicated)	24 years, 63 days	Leader of the Second Serbian Uprising (elected at the Takovo Meeting)
2		Milan Obrenović II; Милан Обреновић II (1819–1839)	Obrenović	25 June 1839	8 July 1839	13 days	Son of Miloš Obrenović I
—		Jevrem Obrenović; Јеврем Обреновић (1790–1856)	Obrenović	25 June 1839	14 March 1840	263 days	Regency Council For Milan Obrenović II (25 June – 8 July 1839) Regency Council For Mihailo Obrenović III (8 July 1839 – 14 March 1840)
—		Toma Vučić Perišić; Тома Вучић Перишић (1787–1859)	—	25 June 1839	14 March 1840	263 days	Regency Council For Milan Obrenović II (25 June – 8 July 1839) Regency Council For Mihailo Obrenović III (8 July 1839 – 14 March 1840)
—		Avram Petronijević; Аврам Петронијевић (1791–1852)	—	25 June 1839	14 March 1840	263 days	Regency Council For Milan Obrenović II (25 June – 8 July 1839) Regency Council For Mihailo Obrenović III (8 July 1839 – 14 March 1840)
3		Mihailo Obrenović III; Михаило Обреновић III (1823–1868)	Obrenović	8 July 1839	14 September 1842 (Deposed)	3 years, 68 days	Son of Miloš Obrenović I
4		Aleksandar Karađorđević; Александар Карађорђевић (1806–1885)	Karađorđević	14 September 1842	23 December 1858 (Abdicated)	16 years, 100 days	Son of Karađorđe Petrović
(1)		Miloš Obrenović I Милош Обреновић I (1780–1860)	Founder of the House of Obrenović	23 December 1858	26 September 1860	1 year, 278 days	Second reign (restored at the St. Andrew's Day Assembly)
(3)		Mihailo Obrenović III; Михаило Обреновић III (1823–1868)	Obrenović	26 September 1860	10 June 1868 (Assassinated)	7 years, 258 days	Second reign Son of Miloš Obrenović I
—		General Milivoje Blaznavac; Генерал Миливоје Блазнавац (1824–1873)	—	10 June 1868	22 August 1872	4 years, 73 days	Regency Council For Milan Obrenović IV
—		Jovan Ristić; Јован Ристић (1831–1899)	—	10 June 1868	22 August 1872	4 years, 73 days	Regency Council For Milan Obrenović IV
—		Jovan Gavrilović; Јован Гавриловић (1796–1877)	—	10 June 1868	22 August 1872	4 years, 73 days	Regency Council For Milan Obrenović IV
5		Milan Obrenović IV; Милан Обреновић IV (1854–1901)	Obrenović	10 June 1868	6 March 1882	13 years, 269 days	Grandnephew of Miloš Obrenović I

=== Kingdom of Serbia ===
Status: Denotes Regent

King				Reign			Claim
No.	Portrait	Name (Birth–Death)	House	Reign start	Reign end	Duration	Claim
1		Milan I Милан I (1854–1901)	Obrenović	6 March 1882	6 March 1889 (Abdicated)	7 years	Previously ruled as Prince
—		Jovan Ristić; Јован Ристић (1831–1899)	—	6 March 1889	13 April 1893 (Deposed)	4 years, 38 days	Regency Council For Alexander I
—		General Jovan Belimarković; Генерал Јован Белимарковић (1827–1906)	—	6 March 1889	13 April 1893 (Deposed)	4 years, 38 days	Regency Council For Alexander I
—		General Kosta Protić; Генерал Коста Протић (1831–1892)	—	6 March 1889	4 June 1892 (Died in Office)	3 years, 90 days	Regency Council For Alexander I
2		Alexander I Александар I (1876–1903)	Obrenović	6 March 1889	11 June 1903 (Assassinated)	14 years, 97 days	Son of Milan I
3		Peter I Петар I (1844–1921) (Note: In exile from November 1915 until the liberation in 1918, due to the occupation by the Central Powers during World War I (see Austro-Hungarian and Bulgarian occupation of Serbia).)	Karađorđević	15 June 1903 (Crowned on 21 September 1904)	1 December 1918	15 years, 169 days	Son of Aleksandar Karađorđević
—		Crown Prince Alexander; Престолонаследник Александар (1888–1934)	Karađorđević	24 June 1914	1 December 1918	4 years, 160 days	Regent; Son of Peter I For Peter I

== Republic ==
=== People's Republic of Serbia / Socialist Republic of Serbia (constituent republic of Yugoslavia) ===
Note: between 1945 and 1974, Serbia's head of state was the speaker (president) of the Serbian parliament.

Political parties: Communist Party of Serbia / League of Communists of Serbia Socialist Party of Serbia

Status: Denotes Acting President

President			Election	Term of office			Party	Notes
No.	Portrait	Name (Birth–Death)	Election	Took office	Left office	Time in office	Party	Notes
President of the Presidency of the National Assembly; 1945–1953
1		Siniša Stanković; Синиша Станковић (1892–1974)	—	7 April 1945	20 November 1946	1 year, 227 days	Communist Party of Serbia	
2		Aćim Grulović; Аћим Груловић (1898–1948)	—	20 November 1946	23 December 1948	2 years, 33 days	Communist Party of Serbia	
3		Isa Jovanović; Иса Јовановић (1906–1983)	—	23 December 1948	December 1953	4 years, 11 months	Communist Party of Serbia (renamed)	Communist Party of Serbia reformed and renamed into the League of Communists of Serbia
3		Isa Jovanović; Иса Јовановић (1906–1983)	—	23 December 1948	December 1953	4 years, 11 months	League of Communists of Serbia	Communist Party of Serbia reformed and renamed into the League of Communists of Serbia
President of the National Assembly; 1953–1963
4		Petar Stambolić; Петар Стамболић (1912–2007)	—	December 1953	April 1957	3 years, 4 months	League of Communists of Serbia	
5		Jovan Veselinov; Јован Веселинов (1906–1982)	—	April 1957	26 June 1963	6 years, 2 months	League of Communists of Serbia	
President of the Assembly; 1963–1974
6		Dušan Petrović; Душан Петровић (1914–1977)	—	26 June 1963	6 May 1967	3 years, 314 days	League of Communists of Serbia	
7		Miloš Minić; Милош Минић (1914–2003)	—	6 May 1967	6 May 1969	2 years	League of Communists of Serbia	
8		Dragoslav Marković; Драгослав Марковић (1920–2005)	—	6 May 1969	19 April 1974	4 years, 348 days	League of Communists of Serbia	
9		Živan Vasiljević; Живан Васиљевић (1920–2007)	—	19 April 1974	6 May 1974	17 days	League of Communists of Serbia	
President of the Presidency; 1974–1991
(8)		Dragoslav Marković; Драгослав Марковић (1920–2005)	—	6 May 1974	5 May 1978	3 years, 364 days	League of Communists of Serbia	
10		Dobrivoje Vidić; Добривоје Видић (1918–1992)	—	5 May 1978	5 May 1982	4 years	League of Communists of Serbia	
11		Nikola Ljubičić; Никола Љубичић (1916–2005)	—	5 May 1982	5 May 1984	2 years	League of Communists of Serbia	
12		Dušan Čkrebić; Душан Чкребић (1927–2022)	—	5 May 1984	5 May 1985	1 year	League of Communists of Serbia	
13		Ivan Stambolić; Иван Стамболић (1936–2000)	—	5 May 1985	14 December 1987 (Note: Removed from the position in the aftermath of the 8th session of the Central Committee of the League of Communists of Serbia.)	2 years, 223 days	League of Communists of Serbia	
14		Petar Gračanin; Петар Грачанин (1923–2004)	—	14 December 1987	20 March 1989	1 year, 96 days	League of Communists of Serbia	
—		Ljubiša Igić; Љубиша Игић (1941–2023)	—	20 March 1989	8 May 1989	49 days	League of Communists of Serbia	Acting President
15		Slobodan Milošević; Слободан Милошевић (1941–2006)	1989	8 May 1989	11 January 1991	1 year, 248 days	League of Communists of Serbia (renamed)	League of Communists of Serbia reformed and renamed into the Socialist Party of Serbia
		Slobodan Milošević; Слободан Милошевић (1941–2006)	1989	8 May 1989	11 January 1991	1 year, 248 days	Socialist Party of Serbia	League of Communists of Serbia reformed and renamed into the Socialist Party of Serbia
President of the Republic; 1991–1992
(15)		Slobodan Milošević; Слободан Милошевић (1941–2006)	1990	11 January 1991	28 April 1992	1 year, 108 days	Socialist Party of Serbia	

=== Republic of Serbia (constituent republic of FR Yugoslavia / State Union of Serbia and Montenegro) ===
Political parties: Socialist Party of Serbia Civic Alliance of Serbia Democratic Party of Serbia Serbian Renewal Movement G17 Plus Democratic Party

Status: Denotes Acting President

President			Election	Term of office			Party	Notes
No.	Portrait	Name (Birth–Death)	Election	Took office	Left office	Time in office	Party	Notes
1 (15)		Slobodan Milošević; Слободан Милошевић (1941–2006)	1992	28 April 1992	23 July 1997	5 years, 86 days	Socialist Party of Serbia	
—		Dragan Tomić; Драган Томић (1935–2022)	—	23 July 1997	29 December 1997	159 days	Socialist Party of Serbia	Acting
2 (16)		Milan Milutinović; Милан Милутиновић (1942–2023)	1997	29 December 1997	29 December 2002	5 years	Socialist Party of Serbia	
—		Nataša Mićić; Наташа Мићић (born 1965)	—	29 December 2002	27 January 2004	1 year, 29 days	Civic Alliance of Serbia	Acting
—		Dragan Maršićanin; Драган Маршићанин (born 1950)	—	4 February 2004	3 March 2004	28 days	Democratic Party of Serbia	Acting
—		Vojislav Mihailović; Војислав Михаиловић (born 1951)	—	3 March 2004	4 March 2004	1 day	Serbian Renewal Movement	Acting
—		Predrag Marković; Предраг Марковић (born 1955)	—	4 March 2004	11 July 2004	129 days	G17 Plus	Acting
3 (17)		Boris Tadić; Борис Тадић (born 1958)	2004	11 July 2004	5 June 2006	1 year, 329 days	Democratic Party	

=== Republic of Serbia ===
Political parties: Democratic Party Socialist Party of Serbia Serbian Progressive Party Student List

Status: Denotes Acting President

President			Election	Term of office			Party	Notes
No.	Portrait	Name (Birth–Death)	Election	Took office	Left office	Time in office	Party	Notes
1 (17)		Boris Tadić; Борис Тадић (born 1958)	2008	5 June 2006	5 April 2012 (Resigned)	5 years, 305 days	Democratic Party	
—		Slavica Đukić Dejanović; Славица Ђукић Дејановић (born 1951)	—	5 April 2012	31 May 2012	56 days	Socialist Party of Serbia	Acting
2 (18)		Tomislav Nikolić; Томислав Николић (born 1952)	2012	31 May 2012	31 May 2017	5 years	Serbian Progressive Party	
3 (19)		Aleksandar Vučić; Александар Вучић (born 1970)	2017; 2022	31 May 2017	27 September 2026 (Resigned)	9 years, 119 days	Serbian Progressive Party	
—		Ana Brnabić; Ана Брнабић (born 1975)	—	27 September 2026 (Note: Vučić handed over presidential duties to Brnabić the following day.)	17 November 2026 (Note: Brnabić's term as president of the National Assembly, and with it her role as acting president, ended when the mandates of the 15th National Assembly were confirmed on 17 November 2026. The office was then vacant, with no one formally acting, until the new Assembly elected Aleksandar Čupić as its president on 19 November 2026.)	51 days	Serbian Progressive Party	Acting
—		Aleksandar Čupić; Александар Чупић (born 1978)	—	19 November 2026	Incumbent	2 days	Independent (Student List)	Acting

== See also ==
- List of Serbian monarchs
- List of Serbian regents
- President of Serbia
  - List of presidents of Serbia
- Prime Minister of Serbia
- List of heads of state of Yugoslavia
- President of Serbia and Montenegro
