= List of leaders of the Socialist Republic of Serbia =

President of the Presidency
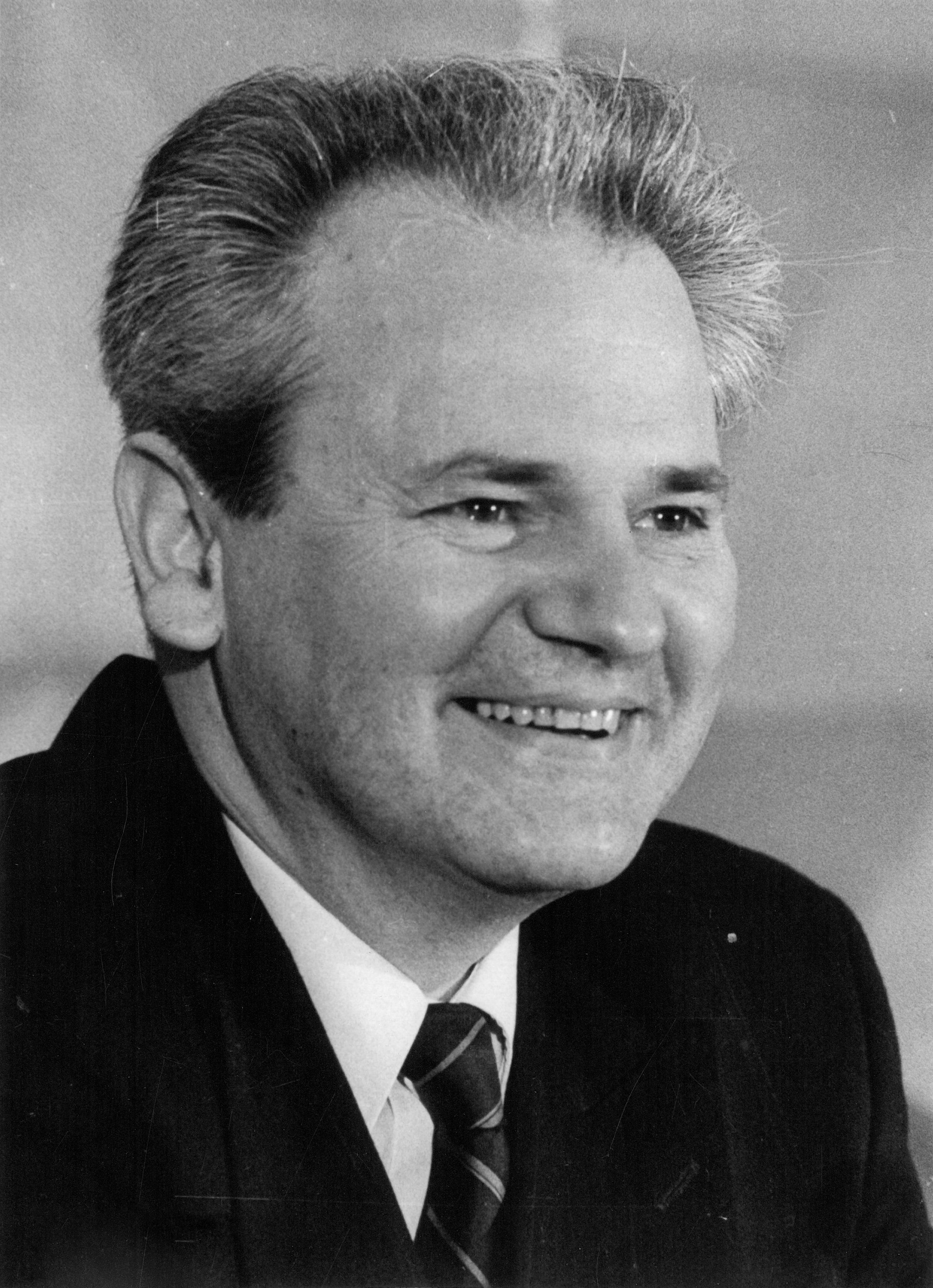
- Slobodan Milošević
- Formation: 12 November 1944
- First holder: Siniša Stanković (As Chairman of the Anti-Fascist Assembly)
- Final holder: Slobodan Milošević (As President of the Presidency)
- Abolished: 11 January 1991

The following is a list of leaders of the Socialist Republic of Serbia (SR Serbia). It lists heads of state and heads of government. In the Socialist Republic, the only legal political party was the League of Communists of Serbia (SKS), which was part of the League of Communists of Yugoslavia (SKJ).

Commonly referred to as Socialist Serbia or simply as Serbia, SR Serbia was the largest, most populous, and most economically developed republic of Yugoslavia in 1945–91.

== Heads of State ==
Prior to 1974, Serbia had no president or state presidency. The most senior state official was the President of the People's Assembly of Serbia, who was considered as the head of state.

In the SR Serbia, the only legal political party was the League of Communists of Serbia, and therefore all heads of state belonged to that political organization.

=== Chairman of the ASNOS ===
Head of State			Term of office		
Nº	Portrait	Name (Born–Died)	Took office	Left office	Duration
Chairman of the Antifascist Assembly for the People's Liberation of Serbia (ASNOS)
1		Siniša Stanković; Синиша Станковић (1892–1974)	12 November 1944	7 April 1945	146 days

=== Presidents of the People's Assembly ===
Head of State			Term of office		
Nº	Portrait	Name (Born–Died)	Took office	Left office	Duration
President of the Presidency of the People's Assembly
1		Siniša Stanković; Синиша Станковић (1892–1974)	7 April 1945	20 November 1946	1 year, 227 days
2		Aćim Grulović; Аћим Груловић (1898–1948)	20 November 1946	23 December 1948	2 years, 33 days
3		Isa Jovanović; Иса Јовановић (1906–1983)	23 December 1948	December 1953	4 years, 343 days
President of the People's Assembly
4		Petar Stambolić; Петар Стамболић (1912–2007)	December 1953	April 1957	3 years, 4 months
5		Jovan Veselinov; Јован Веселинов (1906–1982)	April 1957	26 June 1963	6 years, 2 months
6		Dušan Petrović Šane; Душан Петровић Шане (1914–1977)	26 June 1963	6 May 1967	3 years, 314 days
7		Miloš Minić; Милош Минић (1914–2003)	6 May 1967	6 May 1969	2 years, 0 days
8		Dragoslav Marković; Драгослав Марковић (1920–2005)	6 May 1969	19 April 1974	4 years, 348 days
9		Živan Vasiljević; Живан Васиљевић (1920–2007)	19 April 1974	6 May 1974	17 days

=== Presidents of the Presidency ===
In the SR Serbia, the only legal political party was the League of Communists of Serbia.

Head of State			Term of office		
Nº	Portrait	Name (Born–Died)	Took office	Left office	Duration
1		Dragoslav Marković; Драгослав Марковић (1920–2005)	6 May 1974	5 May 1978	3 years, 364 days
2		Dobrivoje Vidić; Добривоје Видић (1918–1991)	5 May 1978	5 May 1982	4 years, 0 days
3		Nikola Ljubičić; Никола Љубичић (1916–2005)	5 May 1982	5 May 1984	2 years, 0 days
4		Dušan Čkrebić; Душан Чкребић (1927– )	5 May 1984	5 May 1985	1 year, 0 days
5		Ivan Stambolić; Иван Стамболић (1936–2000)	5 May 1985	14 December 1987	2 years, 223 days
6		Petar Gračanin; Петар Грачанин (1923–2004)	14 December 1987	20 March 1989	1 year, 96 days
7		Slobodan Milošević; Слободан Милошевић (1941–2006)	8 May 1989	11 January 1991	1 year, 248 days

== See also ==
- List of heads of state of Serbia, for a comprehensive list of Serbian heads of state since 1804
- President of Serbia
- Prime Minister of Serbia
- List of heads of state of Yugoslavia
