= List of presidents of Serbia =

This is a list of the presidents of Serbia, including the presidents of the Presidency of the Socialist Republic of Serbia (constituent republic of the Socialist Federal Republic of Yugoslavia), presidents of the Republic of Serbia (constituent republic of the Federal Republic of Yugoslavia / State Union of Serbia and Montenegro), and presidents of the Republic of Serbia (as independent state).

The president of Serbia is the head of state of Serbia, elected by popular vote for five years and is limited by the Constitution to a maximum of two terms.

== Socialist Republic of Serbia (constituent republic of SFR Yugoslavia) ==
Parties: League of Communists of Serbia Socialist Party of Serbia

Status: Denotes Acting President

No.	Portrait	Name (Birth–Death)	Term of office			Political party
No.	Portrait	Name (Birth–Death)	Took office	Left office	Time in office	Political party
President of the Presidency; 1974–1991
1		Dragoslav Marković; Драгослав Марковић (1920–2005)	6 May 1974	5 May 1978	3 years, 364 days	League of Communists of Serbia
2		Dobrivoje Vidić; Добривоје Видић (1918–1992)	5 May 1978	5 May 1982	4 years	League of Communists of Serbia
3		Nikola Ljubičić; Никола Љубичић (1916–2005)	5 May 1982	5 May 1984	2 years	League of Communists of Serbia
4		Dušan Čkrebić; Душан Чкребић (1927–2022)	5 May 1984	5 May 1985	1 year	League of Communists of Serbia
5		Ivan Stambolić; Иван Стамболић (1936–2000)	5 May 1985	14 December 1987	2 years, 223 days	League of Communists of Serbia
6		Petar Gračanin; Петар Грачанин (1923–2004)	14 December 1987	20 March 1989	1 year, 96 days	League of Communists of Serbia
–		Ljubiša Igić; Љубиша Игић (1941–2023)	20 March 1989	8 May 1989	49 days	League of Communists of Serbia
7		Slobodan Milošević; Слободан Милошевић (1941–2006)	8 May 1989	11 January 1991	1 year, 248 days	League of Communists of Serbia (Note: League of Communists of Serbia reformed and renamed into the Socialist Party of Serbia)
		Slobodan Milošević; Слободан Милошевић (1941–2006)	8 May 1989	11 January 1991	1 year, 248 days	Socialist Party of Serbia

== Republic of Serbia (constituent republic of FR Yugoslavia / Serbia and Montenegro) ==
Parties: Socialist Party of Serbia Civic Alliance of Serbia Democratic Party of Serbia Serbian Renewal Movement G17 Plus Democratic Party

Status: Denotes Acting President

No.	Portrait	Name (Birth–Death)	Term of office			Political party	Elected
No.	Portrait	Name (Birth–Death)	Took office	Left office	Time in office	Political party	Elected
1		Slobodan Milošević; Слободан Милошевић (1941–2006)	11 January 1991	23 July 1997	6 years, 193 days	Socialist Party of Serbia	1990; 1992
–		Dragan Tomić; Драган Томић (1935–2022)	23 July 1997	29 December 1997	159 days	Socialist Party of Serbia	—
2		Milan Milutinović; Милан Милутиновић (1942–2023)	29 December 1997	29 December 2002	5 years	Socialist Party of Serbia	1997
–		Nataša Mićić; Наташа Мићић (born 1965)	29 December 2002	27 January 2004	1 year, 29 days	Civic Alliance of Serbia	—
–		Dragan Maršićanin; Драган Маршићанин (born 1950)	4 February 2004	3 March 2004	28 days	Democratic Party of Serbia	—
–		Vojislav Mihailović; Војислав Михаиловић (born 1951)	3 March 2004	4 March 2004	1 day	Serbian Renewal Movement	—
–		Predrag Marković; Предраг Марковић (born 1955)	4 March 2004	11 July 2004	129 days	G17 Plus	—
3		Boris Tadić; Борис Тадић (born 1958)	11 July 2004	5 June 2006	1 year, 329 days	Democratic Party	2004

== Republic of Serbia ==
Parties: Democratic Party Socialist Party of Serbia Serbian Progressive Party Student List

Status: Denotes Acting President

No.	Portrait	Name (Birth–Death)	Term of office			Political party	Elected
No.	Portrait	Name (Birth–Death)	Took office	Left office	Time in office	Political party	Elected
1 (3)		Boris Tadić; Борис Тадић (born 1958)	5 June 2006	5 April 2012	5 years, 305 days	Democratic Party	2008
–		Slavica Đukić Dejanović; Славица Ђукић Дејановић (born 1951)	5 April 2012	31 May 2012	56 days	Socialist Party of Serbia	—
2 (4)		Tomislav Nikolić; Томислав Николић (born 1952)	31 May 2012	31 May 2017	5 years	Serbian Progressive Party	2012
3 (5)		Aleksandar Vučić; Александар Вучић (born 1970)	31 May 2017	27 September 2026	9 years, 119 days	Serbian Progressive Party	2017; 2022
–		Ana Brnabić; Ана Брнабић (born 1975)	27 September 2026 (Note: Vučić handed over presidential duties to Brnabić the following day.)	17 November 2026 (Note: Brnabić's term as president of the National Assembly, and with it her role as acting president, ended when the mandates of the 15th National Assembly were confirmed on 17 November 2026. The office was then vacant, with no one formally acting, until the new Assembly elected Aleksandar Čupić as its president on 19 November 2026.)	51 days	Serbian Progressive Party	—
–		Aleksandar Čupić; Александар Чупић (born 1978)	19 November 2026	Incumbent	2 days	Independent (Student List)	—

== See also ==
- List of Serbian monarchs
- List of heads of state of Serbia, for a comprehensive list of Serbian heads of state since 1804
- President of Serbia
- President of the National Assembly of Serbia
- Prime Minister of Serbia
- President of Serbia and Montenegro
- List of heads of state of Yugoslavia
