= Minister of Internal Affairs (SR Serbia) =

The Socialist Republic of Serbia (SR Serbia), one of the republics of the Socialist Federal Republic of Yugoslavia, was led by the League of Communists of Yugoslavia and had the following Ministers of Internal Affairs during its existence 1945—1991:

Minister	Office	Notes
Milentije Popović (1913—1971)	April 9, 1945 — November 22, 1946	Served during the first government of Blagoje Nešković. Participated in the National Liberation War.
Slobodan Penezić (1918—1964)	November 22, 1946 — September 5, 1948	Served during the second government of Blagoje Nešković. People's Hero.
Slavko Zečević	1966 — October 26, 1976	

== See also ==
- Minister of Internal Affairs (Principality of Serbia)
- Minister of Internal Affairs (Kingdom of Serbia)
- Minister of Internal Affairs (Serbia)
