= Branislav Ikonić =

Serbian politician

- Бранислав Иконић
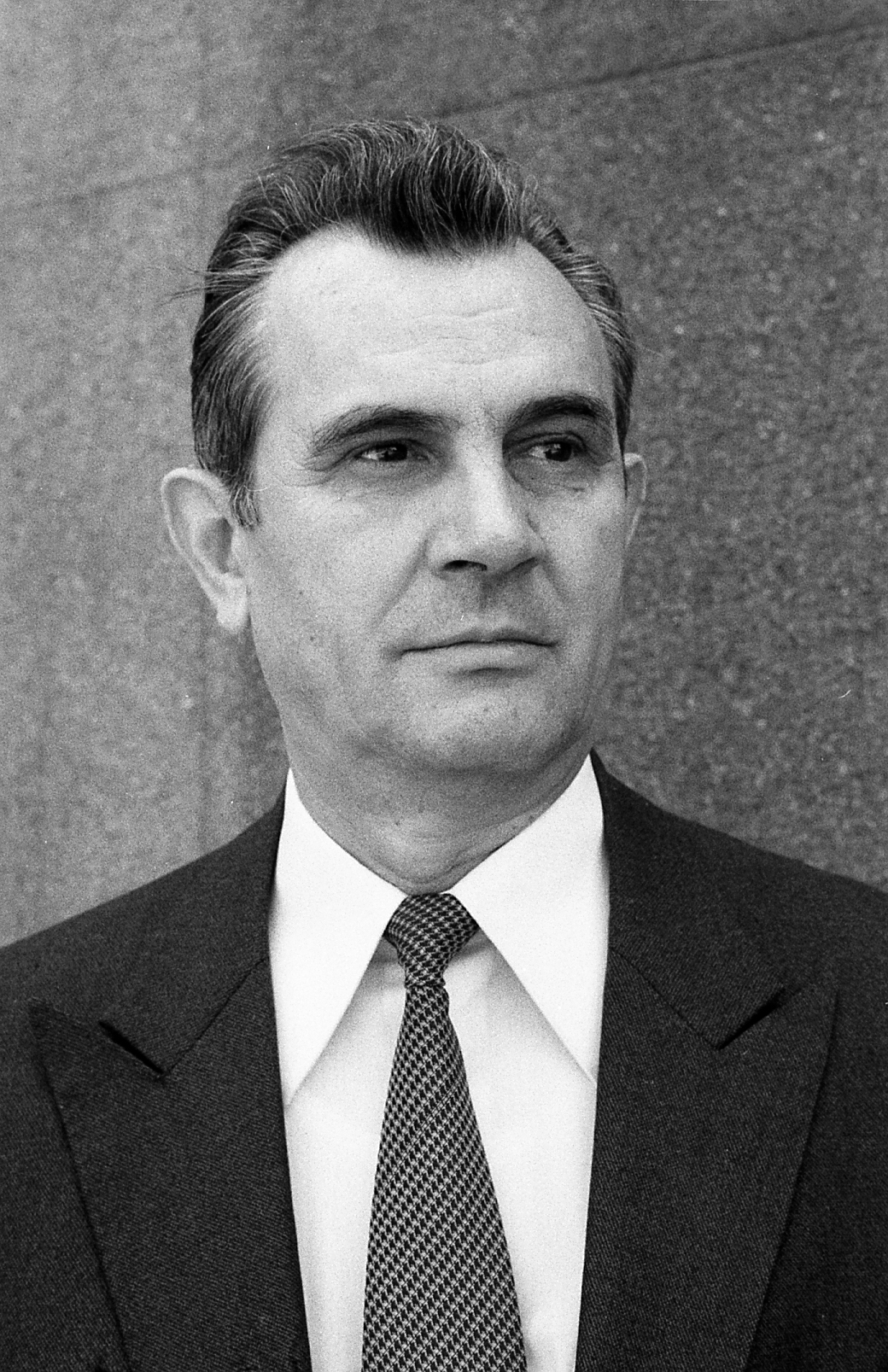

Prime Minister of Serbia President of the People's Government of Serbia
- In office 5 May 1982 – 6 May 1986
- President: Nikola Ljubičić; Dušan Čkrebić
- Preceded by: Ivan Stambolić
- Succeeded by: Desimir Jevtić

President of the National Assembly of Serbia President of the People's Assembly of Serbia
- In office May 1986 – May 1988
- Preceded by: Slobodan Gligorijevć
- Succeeded by: Borisav Jović

Personal details
- Born: 21 June 1928 Gornje Crniljevo, Kingdom of SCS
- Died: 16 January 2002 (aged 73) Belgrade, FR Yugoslavia
- Party: League of Communists of Yugoslavia
- Education: University of Belgrade

Branislav Ikonić (Serbian Cyrillic: Бранислав Иконић; 21 June 1928 – 16 January 2002) was a Yugoslav and Serbian politician who served as prime minister of Serbia from 1982 to 1986. As a member of the League of Communists of Yugoslavia, he was also the president of the National Assembly of Serbia from 1986 to 1988.

== Biography ==
He graduated from the University of Belgrade School of Electrical Engineering and worked in "Viskoza" company from Loznica as an engineer, technical and general director of the company until 1965. Afterwards he served as the vice president, president of the Republic Chamber of Commerce of Serbia. Ikonić held a number of political positions in Serbia and Yugoslavia.

He is one of the few Serbian politicians who, after the Milošević-Stambolić split, did not side with Milošević's faction.

Government offices
Preceded by Miloš Minić	Deputy Prime Minister of Serbia; 1978–1982	Succeeded by Ivo Margan
Preceded by Ivan Stambolić	Prime Minister of Serbia; 1982–1986	Succeeded by Desimir Jevtić
Preceded by Slobodan Gligorijević	President of the National Assembly of Serbia; 1986–1988	Succeeded by Borisav Jović
