= Božidarka Damjanović-Marković =

Yugoslav Partisan commander (1920-1996)

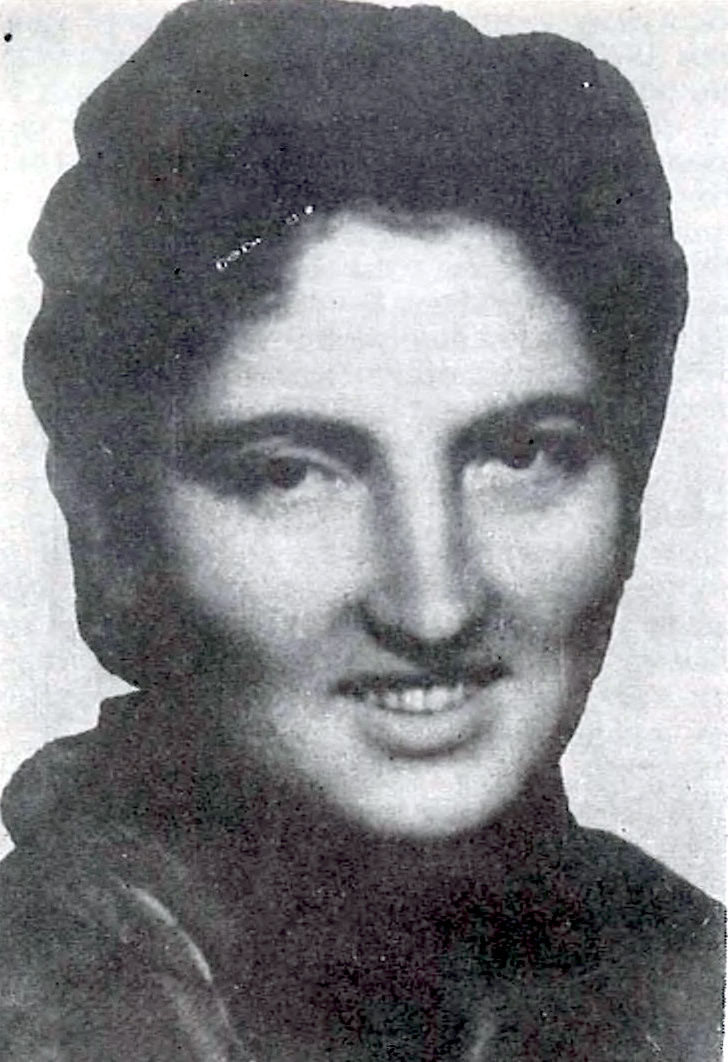
Kika

Božidarka "Kika" Damjanović-Marković (25 September 1920 – 17 January 1996) was a Yugoslav Partisan commander as a participant in the Second World War in Yugoslavia.

After World War II, she participated in high social functions, became a deputy of the Federal Assembly and the National Assembly of the Socialist Republic of Serbia.

She was a recipient of the Commemorative Medal of the Partisans of 1941 and the Order of the People's Hero.

== Early life and education ==
Božidarka Damjanović was born on 25 September 1920, in Mladenovac, in a family of four children. Her father Đura Damjanović was a railway worker, born in Kopljar. She finished elementary school in Mladenovac, and four grades of gymnasium in Smederevska Palanka. Until the beginning of WWII, she completed a women's cottage craft school and began attending a stenographic school. When her family moved to Valjevo, Damjanović remained in Mladenovac in her kum's (Slavic form of a godfather) apartment. The war ended her further education.

== Career ==
=== World War II ===
The organizers of the uprising and members of the Communist Party of Yugoslavia (KPG) in Kragujevac with whom she connected during the summer of 1941, assigned her various tasks related to the rebellion that she successfully performed. While working on the preparation of the uprising, she lived illegally in Mladenovac. She became a member of League of Communist Youth of Yugoslavia (SKOJ) in late June 1941.

In the middle of October 1941, she volunteered to join the Prvi šumadijski partizanski odred (First Partisan Squad Detachment), and from there, she quickly moved to the Kosmajski partizanski odred (Kosmaj Partisan Detachment), where she was admitted to the membership of the Communist Party of Yugoslavia, and then was appointed a member of the Communist Party of Yugoslavia's Commissariat for the Mladenovac District. Soon, she was appointed secretary of the Trust and became a member of the KPJ District Committee for the Mladenovac District.

When the Kosmaj Partisan Detachment withdrew into the Sandžak area due to Operation Uzice of the German Occupation Army and its allies, a partisan company remained on the territory of Kosmaj, which occasionally carried out armed actions. Damjanović participated in all these actions. She received her nickname "Kika" from her colleagues.

In 1942, Damjanović, her husband Draža Marković, Andrija Habuš and another partisans found themselves surrounded at a peasant school in Mladenovac, but they managed to break away.

In 1943, she married Marković, the head of the KPJ. In the same year, Damjanović was appointed as deputy Political commissar. She participated in a large number of battles that the Partisans led against the occupying Wehrmacht and local armed formations: the Special Police, the Serbian State Guard, and the Chetniks.

In the autumn of 1944, during the struggle for the liberation of Serbia, Damjanović commanded the Kosmaj Partisan Detachment.

By the end of the war, she was also a member of the KPJ District Committee for Mladenovac.

After the liberation of Serbia in 1944, she participated in the work of the Court of Honor, which tried Žanka Stokić and Sima Pandurović.

=== Socialist Federal Republic of Yugoslavia period ===
After the end of WWII, she was active in the following political positions: Assistant President of the State Control Commission of the Socialist Republic of Serbia, Head of the Personnel Administration of the Central Committee of the Communist Party of Serbia, and a member of the Executive Board of Savez boraca Narodnooslobodilačkog rata (SUBNOR) Serbia. In parallel with the political activities in these functions, she completed the Teacher Training School. From 1952, she worked as a teacher. Between 1959 and 1963, she served as director at a Belgrade primary school. She was also the Director of the Institute for Primary Education and Education of the Teachers of the Socialist Republic of Serbia.

From the end of the WWII, she was repeatedly elected a national deputy of the Federal Assembly and the National Assembly of the Socialist Republic of Serbia.

=== Writer ===
During the war, she began to deal with journalist-publicist work in the organ of the People's Front of Serbia, Glas, and Kosmajski borac. After the war, she was a contributor to the newspaper Novi dani ("New Days") and numerous other publications. She wrote an autobiography, Ja i moji drugovi ("Me and my comrades").

== Death ==
She died on 17 January 1996.

== Awards and honors ==
- Commemorative Medal of the Partisans of 1941 and other Yugoslav decorations
- October 9, 1953, Order of the People's Hero
- October Award of the City of Belgrade

== Notes ==
1. Damjanović is sometimes spelled as Damnjanović.

== Sources ==
- Narodni heroji Jugoslavije. Belgrade: Mladost. 1975.
- Heroine Jugoslavije. Spektar, Zagreb, 1980.
