= Archives of Biological Sciences =

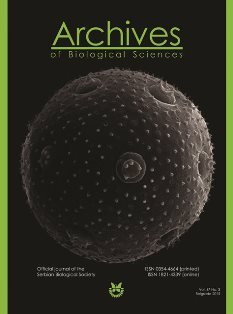
- Discipline: Biology
- Language: English

Publication details
- History: 1993–present
- Publisher: Serbian Biological Society (Serbia)
- Open access: yes
- License: Creative Commons

Standard abbreviations
- ISO 4: Arch. Biol. Sci.

Indexing
- ISSN: 0354-4664

Links
- Journal homepage

The Archives of Biological Sciences is a multidisciplinary journal that covers original research in a wide range of subjects in life science, including biology, ecology, human biology and biomedical research.

== About ==
The Archives of Biological Sciences is a multidisciplinary journal that covers original research in a wide range of subjects in life science, including biology, ecology, human biology and biomedical research. The journal features articles in genetics, botany and zoology (including higher and lower terrestrial and aquatic plants and animals, prokaryote biology, algology, mycology, entomology, etc.); biological systematics; evolution; biochemistry; molecular biology; cell biology, including all aspects of normal cell functioning, from embryonic to differentiated tissues and in different pathological states; physiology; radiobiology; neurobiology; immunology, including human immunology; human biology, including the biological basis of specific human pathologies and disease management.

=== History ===
The journal was established in 1949 as Arhiv bioloških nauka (ISSN 0375-8575). The journal was founded by its first Editor-in-Chief, the academician Siniša Stanković. From 1987, the journal started appearing in English. In 1993 the name of the journal was changed to Archives of Biological Sciences. The journal is published quarterly, and from 2002 it has been available in electronic form.

The National Library of Serbia, in cooperation with the ministries for science and culture, initiated a repository for major scientific journals or DoiSerbia. DoiSerbia functions as an intermediary between CrossRef and journal publishers, by prepares the required metadata according to accepted standards. The full texts of articles are linked to the DoiSerbia repository. The Archives of Biological Sciences was included in this repository since its inception.

The journal is indexed in several international indexing databases for scientific journals, and since 2008 it has been added to the SCI list of academic publications (Science Citation Index – Thomson Reuters). Since 2008, the journal has been indexed in Scopus.

=== Editors ===
- Dr. Goran Poznanović (2014-)
- Dr. Božidar Ćurčić (2005–2014)
- Dr. Maksim Todorović (1993–2005)

=== Publishers ===
- Serbian Biological Society
- Institute for Biological Research "Siniša Stanković", University of Belgrade
- Faculty of Biology, University of Belgrade
- Department of Biology and Ecology, Faculty of Sciences, University of Novi Sad
- Institute for the Application of Nuclear Energy (INEP)
- Faculty of Sciences, University of Banja Luka
- Institute of Molecular Genetics and Genetic Engineering, University of Belgrade

== Frequency ==
The Archives of Biological Sciences is published quarterly.

== Topics ==
- genetics
- botany
- zoology
- biological systematics
- evolution
- biochemistry
- molecular biology
- cell biology, including all aspects of normal cell functioning, from embryonic to differentiated tissues and in different pathological states
- physiology
- neurobiology
- radiobiology
- immunology, including human immunology
- human biology, including the biological basis of specific human pathologies and disease management

== Open access ==
The journal is published in open access electronic format since 2002 (eISSN 1821-4339).

== Indexing ==
- Journal Citation Reports / Science Edition
- Biological Abstracts
- Biosis Previews
- DOAJ
- Zoological Record
- Scopus
