= Cabinet of Blagoje Nešković =

- 1st Cabinet of Socialist Serbia
- 1945–1946
- Emblem of Socialist Serbia
- Date formed: April 9, 1945
- Date dissolved: November 22, 1946

People and organisations
- Head of state: Siniša Stanković
- Head of government: Blagoje Nešković
- Member parties: Communists Party of Yugoslavia (CPY), People's Peasant Party (PPP), Non-Party members

History
- Successor: Cabinet of Blagoje Nešković II

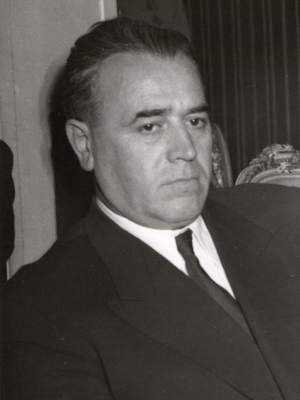
Blagoje Nešković

Cabinet of Blagoje Nešković (also known as the People's Government of Serbia) was the first Government of the Federated State of Serbia, and the first Serbian Government after the liberation of this country from the Nazi occupation. It was formed on April 9, 1945 on a session of the People's Assembly. It was dissolved on November 22, 1946, after the Federative People's Republic of Yugoslavia was declared, and after a new Constitution was adopted. After its dissolution, a new cabinet was formed, headed by the same Prime Minister.

Because this cabinet was formed before the declaration of the Federative People's Republic of Yugoslavia, and before the adoption of a new Constitution, the term used for a person in charge of a Government department was not a "Minister", but a "Trustee".

== Cabinet members ==
Position	Portfolio	Name	Party
Prime Minister	General Affairs	Blagoje Nešković	CPY
First Deputy Prime Minister	General Affairs	Mihailo Đurović	
Second Deputy Prime Minister	General Affairs	Stanislav Bošković	
Trustee	Internal Affairs	Milentije Popović	CPY
Trustee	Justice	Miloš Cerović	
Trustee	Education	Mitra Mitrović-Đilas	CPY
Trustee	Finance	Petar Stambolić	CPY
Trustee	Industry and Mining	Milivoje Perović	None
Trustee	Trade and Procurement	Voja Leković	CPY
Trustee	Agriculture	Milan Smiljanić	None
Trustee	Forests	Miloš Moskovljević	PPP
Trustee	People's Health	Uroš Jekić	None
Trustee	Social Policy	Života Đermanović	None
Trustee	Construction	Mihajlo Stojanović	

== See also ==
- Cabinet of Serbia
- People's Republic of Serbia
- Communists Party of Yugoslavia
- League of Communists of Serbia
