= Anti-fascist Assembly for the National Liberation of Serbia =

The Anti-fascist Assembly for the National Liberation of Serbia (Serbian: Антифашистичка скупштина народног ослобођења Србије, romanized: Antifašistička skupština narodnog oslobođenja Srbije; acr. АСНОС / ASNOS) was formed in November 1944, as the governing body of the Yugoslav National Liberation Movement in the newly liberated Serbia.

In early November 1944, the Great Anti-Fascist People's Liberation Assembly of Serbia (Serbian: Велика антифашистичка народно-ослободилачка скупштина Србије) in Belgrade. It consisted of more than eight hundred delegates, elected throughout liberated regions of Serbia. In order to form permanent representative body, delegates elected 250 representatives, thus constituting the Anti-fascist Assembly for the National Liberation of Serbia. In the same time, they affirmed the policy of reconstituting Yugoslavia as a federation, with Serbia as one of its federal units. Thus was initiated the process that led to the creation of the Federated State of Serbia (Serbian: Федерална Држава Србија), as a federated state within new Democratic Federal Yugoslavia.

== Background ==
In the summer of 1944, during World War II, Yugoslav Partisans broke through Chetnik defenses and entered Serbia from the west. In autumn, the Soviet Red Army reached the Serbian-Romanian border from the east. Joseph Stalin asked the Partisans for permission to enter and fight on Serbian territory. Between 15 and 20 October 1944, the Partisans and the Red Army liberated Vojvodina, eastern and northern Serbia, and Belgrade.

== Presidency ==
Siniša Stanković

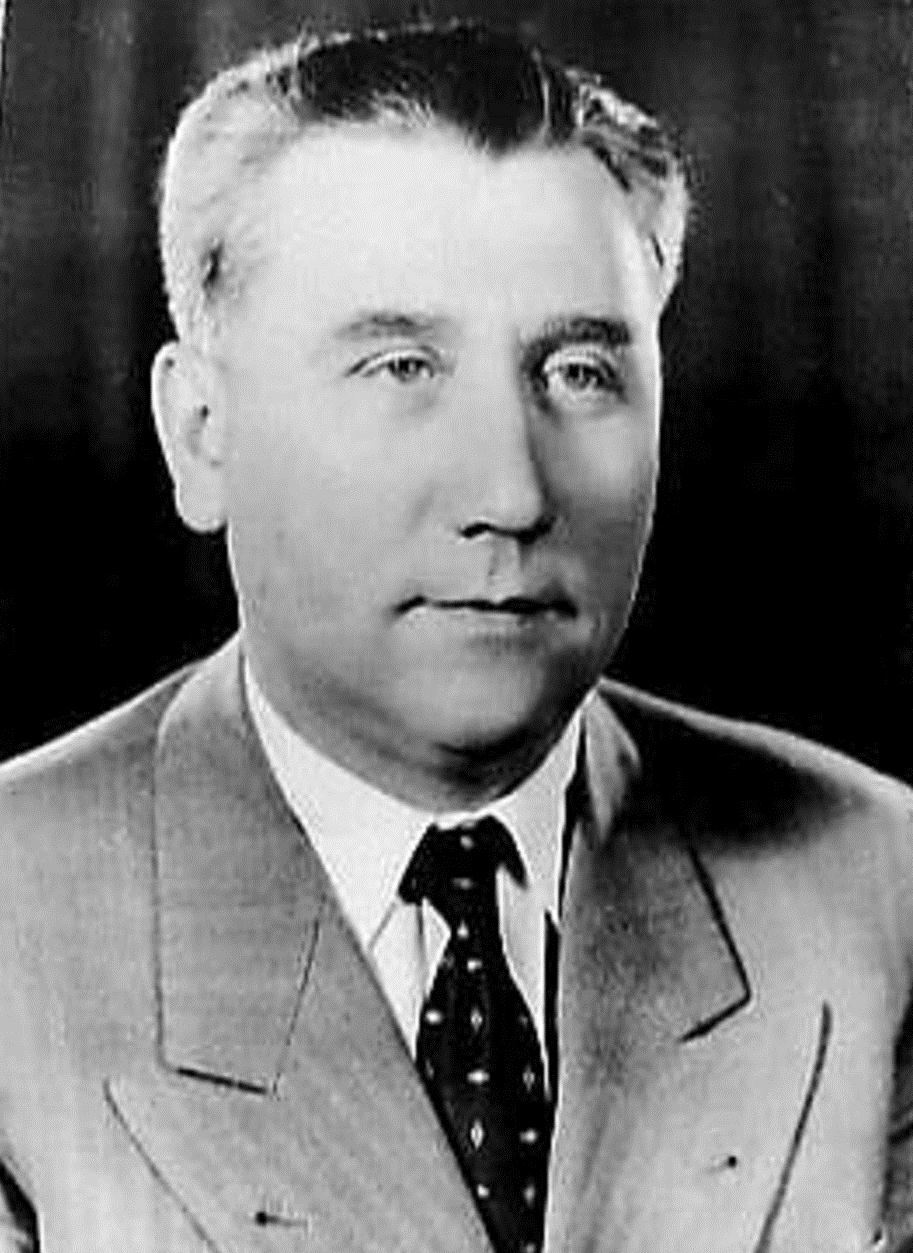
Aleksandar Ranković

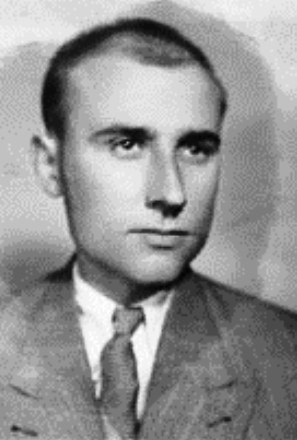
Stanoje Simić

Role	Official	Party
President	Siniša Stanković	KPJ
Vice President	Radovan Grujić	KPJ
Vice President	Aleksandar Ranković	KPJ
Vice President	Stanoje Simić	KPJ
Secretary	Petar Stambolić	KPJ
Secretary	Milorad Vlajković	KPJ
Member	Spasenija Babović	KPJ
Member	Milan Belovuković	KPJ
Member	Milan Bošković	KPJ
Member	Stanislav Bošković	KPJ
Member	Životije Cvetković	KPJ
Member	Vojislav Dulić	KPJ
Member	Života Đermanović	KPJ
Member	Mihailo Đurović	KPJ
Member	Živko Jovanović	KPJ
Member	Radivoje Jovanović	KPJ
Member	Milovan Krdžić	KPJ
Member	Svetozar Krstić	KPJ
Member	Moma Marković	KPJ
Member	Dobrica Matković	Independent
Member	Milosav Milosavljević	KPJ
Member	Mitra Mitrović	KPJ
Member	Petar Mudrinić	KPJ
Member	Blagoje Nešković	KPJ
Member	Živojin Nikolić	KPJ
Member	Slobodan Penezić	KPJ
Member	Milivoje Perović	KPJ
Member	Moša Pijade	KPJ
Member	Koča Popović	KPJ
Member	Milentije Popović	KPJ
Member	Vladislav Ribnikar	KPJ
Member	Pavle Savić	KPJ
Member	Milan Smiljanić	KPJ
Member	Mita Stanisavljević	KPJ
Member	Luka Stojanović	KPJ
Member	Mihajlo Švabić	KPJ
Member	Mijalko Todorović	KPJ
Member	Radomir Todorović	KPJ
Member	Vlada Zečević	KPJ
Member	Sreten Žujović	KPJ

== See also ==
- History of Serbia
- History of the Serbs
- History of Yugoslavia
