= Vera Miletić =

Serbian soldier

- Born: 8 March 1920; Petrovac na Mlavi, Kingdom of Serbs, Croats and Slovenes
- Died: 7 September 1944 (aged 24); Jajinci execution site, German-occupied Serbia
- Cause of death: Execution by firing squad
- Spouse: Moma Marković
- Military career
- Allegiance: Yugoslav Partisans
- Service years: 1941–44
- Nickname: Mira
- Conflicts: World War II in Yugoslavia

Vera Miletić (Serbian Cyrillic: Вера Милетић; 8 March 1920 – 7 September 1944) was a Serbian student and soldier. She was notable for being the mother of Mira Marković, posthumously making her the mother-in-law of Serbian president Slobodan Milošević.

== Personal life ==
Her cousin was Davorjanka Paunović who was the personal secretary of Communist Party of Yugoslavia leader Josip Broz Tito.
