= Davorjanka Paunović =

Yugoslav partisan and Josip Broz Tito's mistress

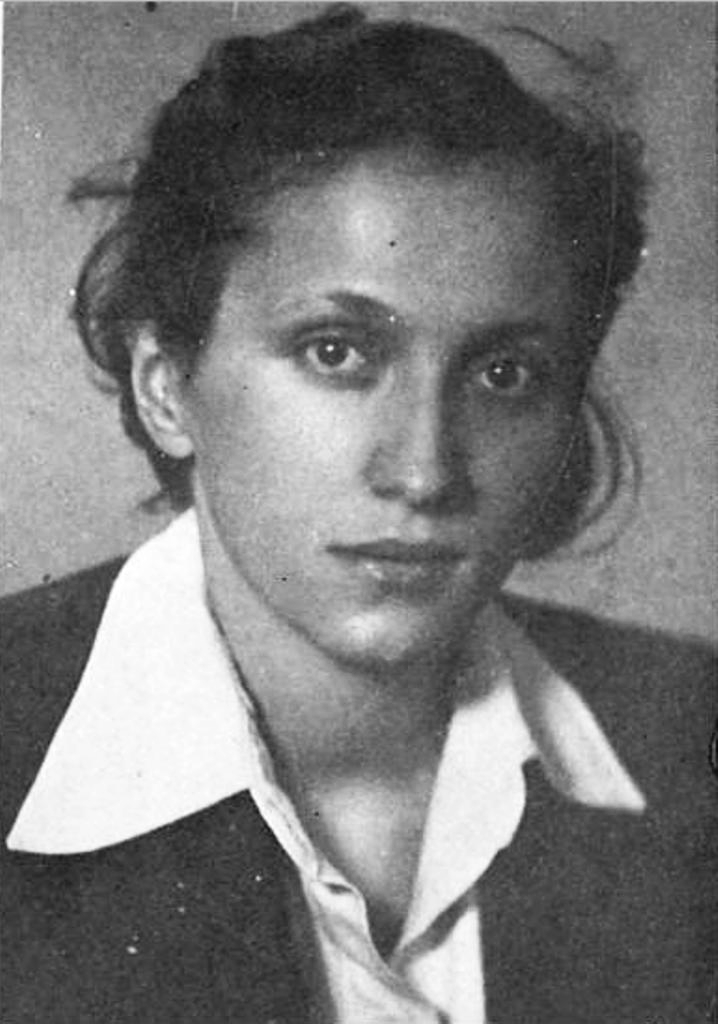
Davorjanka Paunović

Davorjanka Paunović Zdenka (19 January 1921 – 1 May 1946) was a student, participant in the Yugoslav liberation struggle and Josip Broz Tito's mistress.

She joined the youth revolutionary movement and became a member of SKOJ as a high school student in 1936 and continued her political activities as part of various political and revolutionary groups in Požarevac and Belgrade, where she studied French and literature at the University of Philosophy. Before the start of World War II, in 1941, she became the courier for the Politbureau of the Central Committee of the KPJ. She acted as Josip Broz Tito's personal secretary and was part of various marches and offensives across occupied and liberated territories.

During the war she fell ill with tuberculosis, and in the summer of 1944 went to Moscow, Soviet Union for treatment. Upon her return to Yugoslavia she lived with Tito at Rumunjska 5 and Beli dvor, where she worked as his secretary. At the start of 1946 she became ill again and received treatment at Golnik, in Slovenia, where she died on 1 May 1946. She is buried at the Castle complex near Beli dvor, Serbia.

Davorjanka Paunović is considered one of the greatest loves of Josip Broz Tito, with whom she lived a full five years.

== Biography ==
Davorjanka Paunović was born on 19 January 1921, in Kučevo, Kingdom of Serbs, Croats and Slovenes. Around mid 1922 her family moved to Požarevac. (Note: Sources sometimes give Požarevac as the place of birth because she lived there since she was one year old.)

Her father, Milan (1876–1955), was a teacher and decorated World War I veteran. Her mother, Bisenija Bisa (1893–1983), nee Miletić, was a homemaker. She had an older sister, Branka, born in 1912, who succumbed to tuberculosis in 1932. (Note: There was disagreement over whether Branka died in 1933 from malaria or in 1932 from tuberculosis, but a gravestone of the Paunović family has the year of death as 1932) Davorjanka was nicknamed "Dara" and "Darica" in the family.

After moving to Požarevac, Davorjanka and her older sister Branka attended school there. Davorjanka started primary school in 1927, at age six. From a young age she showed an interest in learning and was an excellent student throughout her schooling. She completed her high school education in Požarevac.

=== Revolutionary movement ===
When she was still in high school, Davorjanka, together with her best friend and uncle's sister Vera Miletić joined the youth revolutionary movement in 1936. The same year she joins the then-illegal League of Socialist Youth of Yugoslavia (SKOJ). During her last years in high school, the principal visited her parents and threatened to have her thrown out of school on account of her participation in the communist movement.

Davorjanka and her uncle's sisters Vera, Olga and Branka Miletić were members of the most active group of revolutionary youth in Požarevac, and they were known as the "red girls" there. In 1938 Davorjanka became a member of the Communist Party of Yugoslavia (KPJ). The following year, 1939, she became a member of the Sres council of KPJ for Požarevac, tasked with women's outreach. That same year she completed high school and enrolled in university in Belgrade. She had wanted to study agronomy, but her father convinced her to go to the University of Belgrade, (Note: She studied at the Department of Philology, which became its own separate facult in 1960.) where she studied French and literature.

On her arrival in Belgrade, together with Vera Miletić she joined the revolutionary student movement at the university. Davorjanka was a member of the Union of students from Požarevac and the inter-University women's coalition of SKOJ, while Vera joined the KPJ regional committee for Belgrade to work with high school youth. While at university, Davorjanka visited Požarevac often, continuing to be politically active there. In June 1940 she became a member of the newly formed SKOJ regional committee in Požarevac. In autumn of the same year she became the secretary of the Party office at her university.

Davorjanka was very educated. Along with French, she spoke German and Czech. She came from a wealthy family which was evident in her modern style of dress. The police at the time was not in the habit of stopping young women, so they were well-suited for courier work, that was difficult and dangerous as the activities of the KPJ were against the law. In February 1941 Davorjanka was in Zagreb, attending an illegal radio operator course. There she met Josip Broz Tito, who was general-secretary of the KPJ. He was there surveying the course and meeting the participants.

Davorjanka became the courier between the KPJ regional committee for Serbia and the KPJ central committee in Zagreb. In March 1941 she transferred to Zagreb, where she became a courier for the KPJ central committee's Politburo. She went underground, taking the pseudonym Zdenka Horvat.

=== World War II ===
In April 1941, World War II broke out and a month later, on 8 May 1941, Davorjanka followed Tito on his move from Zagreb to Belgrade.

Davorjanka was Tito's personal courier during his stay in occupied Belgrade, from May until September 1941. Tito lived in Dedinje, at the villa of the Nenadović family, while Davorjanka lived nearby at Rumunska street. (Note: In 1948, Rumunska street was renamed to Užička street, a name it still has today.) Along with Davorjanka, Mileva Lula Planojević, Grozdana Zina Belić i Ljubinka Đurđević Buba all worked for Tito as couriers at the time. Ljubinka and Davorjanka were Tito's connection to the courier interchanges and Mileva and Grozdana was how he kept in touch with the other members of the central committee.

On 16 September 1941, when Tito moved from Belgrade to the liberated territory of western Serbia, to Užice, part of the territory of the so called "Republic of Užice", Davorjanka went with him as his personal secretary, typist and housekeeper.

She was with Tito and the Supreme Headquarters of PLA and PDY during the whole Yugoslav war of liberation. She was at Užice, Sandžak and Foča. She took part in the Partisan Long March, Battle of Neretva and Battle of Sutjeska, in the defense against the German offensive on Drvar (Operation Rösselsprung). In June 1944 she went to Vis along with the supreme headquarters. There, it became apparent that the long marches and the enemy offensives had taken their toll on her health, and Tito managed to convince her to go to the Soviet Union for treatment.

During her stay in the Soviet Union, she was treated at the sanatorium in Moscow. She was politically active during her treatment. She visited women's and youth organisations and held lectures about the liberation struggle in Yugoslavia. Her treatment was not completely successful as she did not follow all of the doctors' recommendations. She returned to Yugoslavia at her own discretion, at the beginning of October 1944, when Tito visited Moscow, right before the liberation of Belgrade.

=== After the war ===
After the liberation of Yugoslavia, Davorjanka became the personal secretary of Tito, Marshall of Yugoslavia, and resided first at the Rumunjska 15 residence and then at Beli dvor, where she also took on the duties of a housekeeper. At the beginning of 1946 she became ill with an inflammation of the right pleura. First she was treated in Belgrade, and then she was referred to a sanatorium in Golnik, near Kranj. She died there 1 May 1946. After her own wishes, she was buried in the Castle complex at Dedinje, near Beli dvor.

She had a rank of major in the Yugoslav army. She is the bearer of the Commemorative Medal of the Partisans of 1941, and she was decorated with the Yugoslavian Order of Brotherhood and Unity, and the Soviet Order of the Patriotic War, first degree.

== Legacy ==
Streets in Požarevac and Petrovac on Mlava are named after her, and her name is on the memorial stone of teachers and students of Požarevac gymnasium (Note: The gymnasium is now a primary school, "Dositej Obradović", and the memorial stone rests there.) who died in the war.

The character of Davorjanka Paunović appeared in the TV show Odlazak ratnika, povratak maršala (Departure of warriors, return of marshalls) in 1986, played by Olivera Ježina. Her character also made an appearance in the docu-fiction series Tito from 2010, where she was played by Zrinka Cvitešić, and in the TV show Ravna gora from 2013, where she was played by Milena Jakšić.

== Bibliography ==
- Dedijer, Vladimir (1981). Novi prilozi za biografiju Josipa Broza Tita (vol. 2). Zagreb: Mladost.
- Vujošević, Ubavka (1977). Tito u Beogradu 1926–1944. Belgrade: Belgrade Museum.
- Marković, Mirjana (2015). Bilo je to ovako. Belgrade: Večernje novosti.
- Labović, Đurica (1995). Tajne enigme o Veri Miletić. Belgrade: Eksportpres.
- Radulović, Filip (1990). Ljubavi Josipa Broza. Belgrade: Grafos.
- Josip Broz Tito – Sabrana djela tom VI. Beograd: Komunist. 1983.
- Žene Srbije u NOB. Beograd: Prosveta. 1975.
