= Brezova, Ivanjica =

Brezova Брезова
- Village
- Location within Serbia
- Coordinates: 43°32′29″N 20°03′34″E
- Country: Serbia
- District: Moravica District
- Municipality: Ivanjica

Area
  - Total: 22.45 km^{2} (8.67 sq mi)

Population (2011)
  - Total: 483
  - Density: 21.5/km^{2} (55.7/sq mi)
- Time zone: UTC+1 (CET)
  - Summer (DST): UTC+2 (CEST)

Brezova is a village in the municipality of Ivanjica, Serbia. According to the 2011 census, the village has a population of 483 inhabitants.

== Notable people ==
- Ljuba Čupa (1877–1913), guerrilla fighter
- Petar Stambolić (1912–2007), politician
- Ivan Stambolić (1936–2000), politician
