= Popović (Sopot) =

Popović Поповић
- Village
- Location within Serbia
- Coordinates: 44°34′N 20°36′E
- Country: Serbia
- District: Belgrade District
- Municipality: Sopot

Population (2022)
  - Total: ▲1,604
- Time zone: UTC+1 (CET)
  - Summer (DST): UTC+2 (CEST)

Popović (Serbian Cyrillic: Поповић) is a village in the municipality of Sopot, Serbia. According to the 2022 census, the village has a population of 1604 people.

== Notable residents ==
- Moma Marković
