= List of Serbian regents =

This is a list of Serbian regents, a regent (Serbian: намесник/namesnik), from the Latin regens "one who reigns", is a person selected to act as head of state (ruling or not) because the ruler is a minor, not present, or debilitated.

== Middle Ages ==
- Empress Helena, Regent of Serbia during the minority of Stefan Uroš V (1355 to 1356)
- Princess Milica, Regent of Serbia during the minority of Stefan Lazarević (1389 to 1393)
- Council of Regency during the Serbian Despotate: veliki vojvoda Mihailo Anđelović, prince Stefan Branković, and despotess Helena Palaiologina (fl. 1458)

== Principality of Serbia and Kingdom of Serbia ==
- Council of Regency during the minority of Prince Milan (1868 to 1872): Milivoje Petrović Blaznavac, Jovan Ristić and Jovan Gavrilović
- Council of Regency during the minority of King Aleksandar (1889 to 1893): Jovan Ristić, Jovan Belimarković and Kosta Protić (d. 1892)
- Crown Prince Alexander (1888–1934), Regent of Serbia during the reign of retired King Peter I of Serbia (1914 to 1918)

== Kingdom of Yugoslavia ==
- Crown Prince Alexander I of Yugoslavia (1888–1934), Regent of Yugoslavia during the reign of retired King Peter I of Yugoslavia (1918 to 1921)
- Prince Paul of Yugoslavia (1893–1976), Regent of Yugoslavia during the minority of Peter II of Yugoslavia (1934 to 1941).

== Serbian regents in other countries ==
- Helena and Beloš Vukanović, Regents of Hungary during the minority of Géza II of Hungary (1141 to 1146)

== See also ==
- Regency
- List of regents
- List of Serbian monarchs
- President of Serbia
- Prime Minister of Serbia
