= Ljubiša Igić =

Serbian politician (1941–2023)

- Љубиша Игић

President of the Presidium of SR Serbia
- In office 20 March – 8 May 1989
- Preceded by: Petar Gračanin
- Succeeded by: Slobodan Milošević

Personal details
- Born: 31 May 1941 Bela Palanka, Serbia, Yugoslavia
- Died: 26 August 2023 (aged 82) Niš, Serbia
- Party: Serbian branch of the League of Communists of Yugoslavia

Ljubiša Igić (Serbian: Љубиша Игић; 31 May 1941 – 26 August 2023) was a high-standing official of the Serbian branch of the League of Communists of Yugoslavia (LCY), and in that capacity served as acting President of the Presidium of the Socialist Republic of Serbia, literally acting head of state, from 20 March to 8 May 1989. He also served as a member of the LCY Central Committee elected at the 12th Congress, which served from 1982 to 1986.

After the fall of communism in Serbia, Igić went on to serve as director of the private enterprise Ei Niš.

== Bibliography ==
- Stroynowski, Juliusz, ed. (1989). Who's Who in the Socialist Countries of Europe: I–O. K. G. Saur Verlag. ISBN 3-598-10719-6.
