= Moma Marković =

Serbian political commissar (1912–1992)

Momčilo Marković
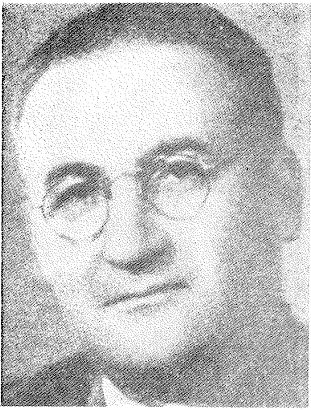
- Born: 16 November 1912; Popović, Kingdom of Serbia
- Died: 7 August 1992 (aged 79); Belgrade, FR Yugoslavia
- Burial place: Belgrade New Cemetery
- Spouse(s): Vera Miletić; Nada Petrović; Vera Dimitrijević
- Military career
- Allegiance: Yugoslav Partisans
- Service years: 1941–45
- Nickname: Moma
- Conflicts: World War II in Yugoslavia
- Awards: Order of the People's Hero

Momčilo "Moma" Marković (Serbian Cyrillic: Момчило Мома Марковић; 16 November 1912 – 7 August 1992) was a Serbian communist politician.

He was awarded the Order of the People's Hero on 6 July 1953.

== Personal life ==
His father Mića Marković was also a member of the Communist Party of Yugoslavia (KPJ) and a delegate at the 2nd KPJ Congress in 1920 held in Vukovar. From Moma's relationship with Vera Miletić he had a daughter named Mira Marković who was later married to Serbian president Slobodan Milošević. Dragoslav Marković, President of Serbia, was his younger brother.
