= Siniša Stanković =

Yugoslav-Serbian scientist and politician (1892-1974)

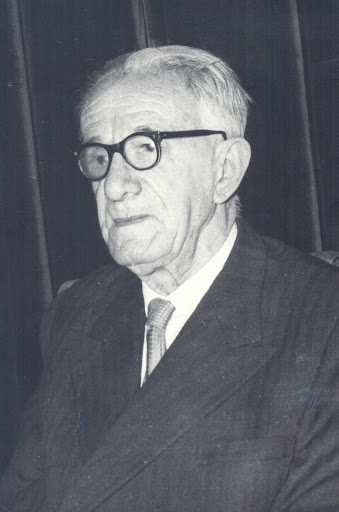
- Siniša Stanković in 1969

President of the Presidency of ASNOS
- In office 12 November 1944 – 7 April 1945
- Prime Minister: Josip Broz Tito
- Preceded by: Office established
- Succeeded by: Office abolished

1st President of the Presidency of the National Assembly of the People's Republic of Serbia
- In office 7 April 1945 – 20 November 1946
- Prime Minister: Blagoje Nešković
- Preceded by: Office established
- Succeeded by: Aćim Grulović

Personal details
- Born: 26 March 1892 Zaječar, Kingdom of Serbia
- Died: 24 February 1974 (aged 81) Belgrade, Serbia, Yugoslavia
- Party: League of Communists of Yugoslavia (SKJ)
- Awards: Order of National Liberation; Order of Merits for the People

Siniša Stanković (Serbian: Синиша Станковић; Serbian pronunciation: [sǐniʃa stǎːŋkoʋitɕ]; 26 March 1892 – 24 February 1974) was a Yugoslav and Serbian scientist and politician. As a prominent biologist, he became member of the Serbian Academy of Sciences and Arts. As a politician and statesman, from 1944 to 1946, he was the most senior state official of Serbia, then a federated state within Yugoslavia, and the 1st President of the Presidency of the National Assembly of Serbia.

== Biography ==
He served as President of the Presidency of the Anti-fascist Assembly for the National Liberation of Serbia (ASNOS), from November 1944 to April 1945, and then as President of the Presidency of the National Assembly of Serbia, from April 1945 to November 1946. In that post, he was the head of state of Serbia, and as such the first non-royal head of state in that country.

Stanković was born in Zaječar, Kingdom of Serbia and died in Belgrade, SFR Yugoslavia. He graduated from the University of Belgrade and Grenoble University. As a prominent biologist, he became member of the Serbian Academy of Sciences and Arts. He was founder of Institute for ecology and biogeography, and director of the Biological Institute of Serbia. He had a long career in the Serbian and Yugoslav communist parties. During the Second World War he was member of communist Partisan movement.

One species of pseudoscorpion is named after him as (lat. Neobisium stankovici).

== Selected works ==
- Living space, critic of racism and nazism
- The framework of life
- Lake Ohrid and its living world

== See also ==
- Socialist Republic of Serbia
- Democratic Federal Yugoslavia
- Cabinet of Blagoje Nešković

Political offices
Preceded by Office established	President of the Presidency of the Anti-fascist Assembly for the National Liberation of Serbia (ASNOS); 12 November 1944 – 7 April 1945	Succeeded by himself as President of the President of the Presidency of the National Assembly of Serbia
Preceded by himself as President of the Presidency of ASNOS	President of the President of the Presidency of the National Assembly of Serbia; 7 April 1945 – November 1946	Succeeded by Aćim Grulović as President of the President of the Presidency of the National Assembly of Serbia
