= Dragoslav Marković =

Serbian politician (1920–2005)

- Драгослав Марковић

1st President of Serbia as President of the Presidency of SR Serbia
- In office 6 May 1969 – 19 April 1974
- Preceded by: Miloš Minić
- Succeeded by: Živan Vasiljević
- In office 6 May 1974 – 5 May 1978
- Preceded by: Živan Vasiljević
- Succeeded by: Dobrivoje Vidić

President of the Assembly of Yugoslavia
- In office 1978–1982
- Preceded by: Kiro Gligorov
- Succeeded by: Raif Dizdarević

President of the Presidency of the LCY Central Committee
- In office 30 June 1983 – 26 June 1984
- Preceded by: Mitja Ribičič
- Succeeded by: Ali Šukrija

Personal details
- Born: 28 June 1920 Popović, Kingdom of SCS
- Died: 20 April 2005 (aged 84) Belgrade, Serbia and Montenegro
- Party: League of Communists of Yugoslavia
- Spouse: Božidarka "Kika" Damnjanović-Marković

Dragoslav "Draža" Marković (Serbian: Драгослав Дража Марковић; 28 June 1920 – 20 April 2005) was a Serbian communist politician, serving as President and Prime Minister of Serbia.

== Biography ==
He was born in 1920, in the village of Popović near Sopot. His parents Milorad "Mića" and Anka, were teachers who had three other children.

He finished elementary school in his native village and then went to Belgrade to attend the Third Belgrade Gymnasium. Under the influence of his left-wing father and brother Moma, who was already one of the leaders of the party organization at the Faculty of Medicine, he joined the youth revolutionary movement. In 1937, as a pupil of the eighth grade of the gymnasium, he was arrested for communist activity. After three weeks in custody, he was expelled from school. He moved to Pančevo where he finished eighth grade and graduated. After finishing high school, he enrolled at the Faculty of Medicine in Belgrade.

During the Second World War, he fought as a member of the Partisans.

In 1958, he became the Education Secretary in the Executive Council of the Socialist Republic of Serbia, and in 1960, he was elected a member of the Executive Committee of the Central Committee of the SR of Serbia.

From 1963 to 1967, he acted as Ambassador of Yugoslavia to Bulgaria. From 1967 to 1969, he was the President of the Republic Council of the Assembly of Serbia, and the President of the Constitutional Commission of Serbia.

From 1969 to 1974, he was the President of the Assembly of Serbia.

From 1971 to 1974, he was also a member of the first Presidency of Yugoslavia.

When in 1974, in accordance with the new Constitution, the function of the President of the Presidency of the Republic of Serbia was introduced, he was the first to perform this duty (from 1974 to 1978).

He was the President of the Assembly of Yugoslavia from 1978 to 1982, and President of the Presidency of the Central Committee of the League of Communists of Yugoslavia from 1983 to 1984.

At the time of the rise of Slobodan Milošević to power, he clashed with his politics and retired soon afterwards, in 1986.

After retirement, he was a member of the Federation Council until its abolition in 1990.

In his later years, he was one of the sharper critics of Slobodan Milošević's regime, and of Mirjana Marković, his niece.

He died on 20 April 2005 in Belgrade, where he was cremated and later interred in the Belgrade New Cemetery. He died just 7 days after the death of the third President of the Presidency of Serbia Nikola Ljubičić.

Marković was awarded a number of Yugoslav and foreign awards and decorations, including the Order of the British Empire and Legion of Honour.
