= President of the Presidency of the Socialist Republic of Serbia =

Serbian political office

- State Emblem

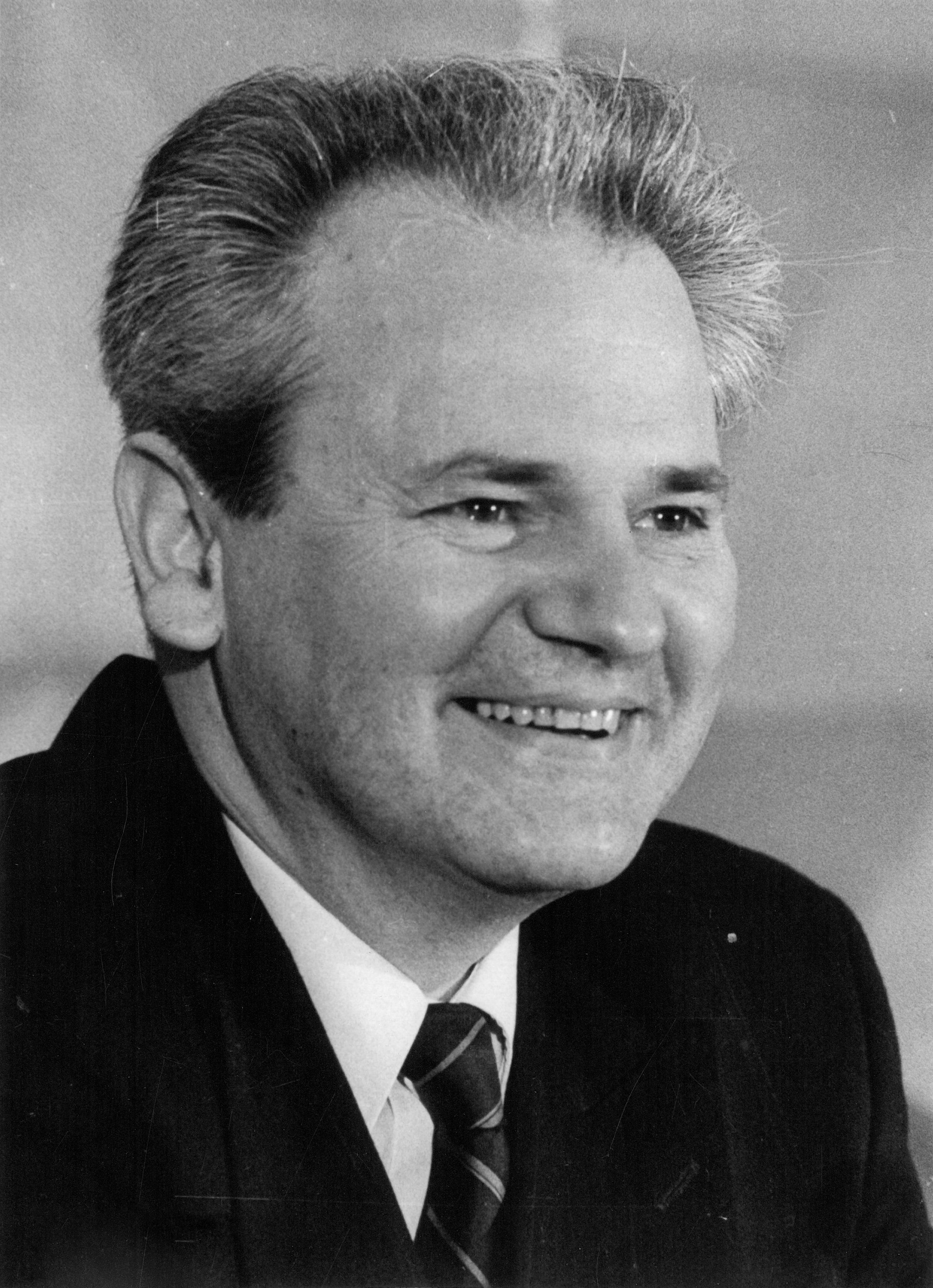
- Last officeholder Slobodan Milošević
- Residence: Novi dvor, Belgrade
- Appointer: Assembly of Serbia
- Formation: 1974
- First holder: Dragoslav Marković
- Final holder: Slobodan Milošević
- Abolished: 1990
- Succession: President of Serbia

The office of the president of the presidency of the Socialist Republic of Serbia existed from its establishment in the 1974 constitution to its renaming and then total abolition as part of the anti-bureaucratic revolution in 1990.

A collective presidency existed in Yugoslavia at the federal level since amendments to the constitution in 1971. On 21 February 1974 a new federal Constitution was adopted which reaffirmed the collective federal presidency chaired by the president of the presidency. The constituent republics adopted the same system in new constitutions of their own.

== List of presidents ==
League of Communists of Yugoslavia Socialist Party of Serbia

Presidency	No.	President	Lifespan	Term of office		Party	Notes
1974–1978	1	Dragoslav Marković; Драгослав Марковић	1920–2005	6 May 1974	5 May 1978	League of Communists of Yugoslavia	
1978–1982	2	Dobrivoje Vidić; Добривоје Видић	1918–1991	5 May 1978	5 May 1982	League of Communists of Yugoslavia	
1982–1984	3	Nikola Ljubičić; Никола Љубичић	1916–2005	5 May 1982	5 May 1984	League of Communists of Yugoslavia	Also at one time held the position of Federal Secretary of People's Defense of Yugoslavia.
1984–1986	4	Dušan Čkrebić; Душан Чкребић	1927–2022	5 May 1984	5 May 1986	League of Communists of Yugoslavia	Also at one time served as President of the Executive Council of Serbia.
1986–1987; 1987–1988	5	Ivan Stambolić; Иван Стамболић	1936–2000	5 May 1986	14 December 1987	League of Communists of Yugoslavia	Also at one time served as President of the Executive Council of Serbia. Assassinated in 2000.
1987–1988; 1988–1989	6	Petar Gračanin; Петар Грачанин	1923–2004	14 December 1987	20 March 1989	League of Communists of Yugoslavia	Also at one time held the position of Chief of the General Staff of Yugoslav People's Army.
1988–1989	N/A	Ljubiša Igić; Љубиша Игић	1941–2023	20 March 1989	8 May 1989	League of Communists of Yugoslavia	Acting.
1988–1989; 1989–1990	7	Slobodan Milošević; Слободан Милошевић	1941–2006	8 May 1989	28 September 1990	League of Communists of Yugoslavia (until July 1990)	The pan-Yugoslav League of Communists of Yugoslavia was dissolved in January 1990 into six political parties (one for each republic), in Serbia that was the Socialist Party of Serbia.
1988–1989; 1989–1990	(7)	Slobodan Milošević; Слободан Милошевић	1941–2006	8 May 1989	28 September 1990	Socialist Party of Serbia (from July 1990)	The pan-Yugoslav League of Communists of Yugoslavia was dissolved in January 1990 into six political parties (one for each republic), in Serbia that was the Socialist Party of Serbia.

== See also ==
- Presidency of Yugoslavia
- President of the Presidency of Yugoslavia
