= Blagoje Nešković =

Yugoslav communist politician

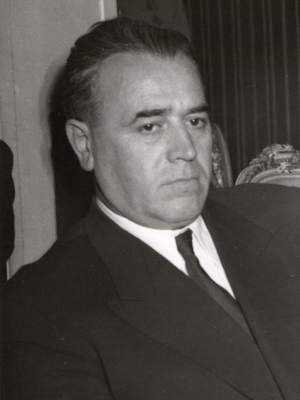
A portrait of Blagoje Nešković

Blagoje Nešković (11 February 1907, in Kragujevac – 11 November 1984, in Belgrade) was a Yugoslav communist politician and Doctor of Medicine in Spanish Civil War who served as the first Secretary of the Central Committee of the Communist Party of Serbia (1945–1948). During World War II in Yugoslavia, he was a member of the Presidency of the Anti-fascist Assembly for the National Liberation of Serbia.

== See also ==
- Cabinet of Blagoje Nešković (1945–1946)
