= Socialist Republic of Serbia =

Constituent republic of Yugoslavia (1945–1992)

Socialist Republic of Serbia (Note: Formerly known as: 1946–1963: People's Republic of Serbia (Serbo-Croatian: Народна Република Србија; Serbo-Croatian: Narodna Republika Srbija)) (1963–1990) Социјалистичка Република Србија Socijalistička Republika Srbija (Serbo-Croatian) Republic of Serbia (1990–1992) Република Србија Republika Srbija (Serbo-Croatian)
- 1944–1992
- Flag (1947–1992) Emblem (1947–1992)

- Serbia within Yugoslavia
- Status: Constituent republic of Yugoslavia
- Capital: Belgrade
- Official languages: Serbo-Croatian (Note: The 1990 constitution of the Republic of Serbia, Article 8, stated: "In the Republic of Serbia, the Serbo-Croatian language and the Cyrillic alphabet are in official use, while the Latin alphabet is in official use in the manner established by law.")
- Common languages: Serbo-Croatian (Serbian variant); Hungarian; Albanian
- Government: 1944–1990: Unitary communist state 1990–1992: Unitary parliamentary republic
- Leader of the LCS
  - 1944–1949: Blagoje Nešković (first)
  - 1989–1990: Bogdan Trifunović (last)
- Head of state
  - 1944–1953: Siniša Stanković (first)
  - 1989–1992: Slobodan Milošević (last)
- Head of government
  - 1945–1948: Blagoje Nešković (first)
  - 1989–1990: Stanko Radmilović (last)
- Legislature: National Assembly
- Historical era: Cold War, World War II
  - ASNOS: 9–12 November 1944
  - End of World War II: 8 May 1945
  - Last Constitution adopted: 28 September 1990
  - Federal Republic of Yugoslavia declared: 27 April 1992
- HDI (1991): ▼0.719 high
- ISO 3166 code: RS
Preceded by
Territory of the Military Commander in Serbia
Kingdom of Hungary
Independent State of Croatia
Kingdom of Bulgaria
Succeeded by
Federal Republic of Yugoslavia
Republic of Serbia
- Today part of: Serbia; Kosovo

The Socialist Republic of Serbia (SR Serbia), known from 1946 to 1963 as the People's Republic of Serbia, was one of the six constituent republics of the Socialist Federal Republic of Yugoslavia. Its formation was initiated in 1941, and achieved in 1944–1946, when it was established as a federated republic within Yugoslavia. In that form, it lasted until the constitutional reforms from 1990 to 1992, when it was reconstituted, as the Republic of Serbia within the Federal Republic of Yugoslavia. It was the largest constituent republic of Yugoslavia, in terms of population and territory. Within Serbia were the two autonomous provinces: Kosovo and Vojvodina. Its capital, Belgrade, was also the federal capital of Yugoslavia.

== History ==
=== World War II ===
After the collapse of the Kingdom of Yugoslavia in the April War (1941), the entire country was occupied and partitioned between Axis powers. Central territories of Serbia and the northern region of Banat were occupied by Nazi Germany, that enforced direct control over the Territory of the Military Commander in Serbia, with a puppet Government installed in Belgrade. Southern regions of Metohija and Kosovo were occupied by Fascist Italy and annexed into the Italian Albania. The region of Bačka was annexed by Hungary, while Syrmia was possessed by the Independent State of Croatia. Southeastern parts of Serbia were occupied by Bulgaria.

At the beginning of the occupation, there were two resistance movements: Chetniks and Partisans. They had conflicting ideological and political programs, with Chetniks abandoning initial joint resistance efforts alongside Partisans by the end of the Uprising in Serbia, switching instead to extensive collaboration with Axis forces. Partisans advocated transformation of Yugoslavia into a federation, with Serbia becoming one of its federal units. In the autumn of 1941, first provisional institutions were established by partisans in some liberated territories, headed by the Main National Liberation Committee for Serbia. It was seated in Užice, and thus the movement became known as the Republic of Užice. However, the German offensive crushed this proto-state in December of the same year. After that, main partisan forces moved to Bosnia.

=== People's Republic of Serbia ===
Flag of the Federated State of Serbia, 1945

Serbia was liberated in the autumn of 1944, by partisan forces and the Red Army. Soon after the liberation of Belgrade on 20 October, creation of new administration was initiated. In November 1944, the Anti-fascist Assembly for the People's Liberation of Serbia was convened, affirming the policy of reconstituting Yugoslavia as a federation, with Serbia as one of its federal units. Thus was laid the foundation for the creation of the Federated State of Serbia (Serbo-Croatian Cyrillic: Федерална Држава Србија), as a federated state within new Democratic Federal Yugoslavia.

The process was formalised in April 1945, when the provisional People's Assembly of Serbia was created, also appointing the first People's Government of Serbia. Two newly created regions, Autonomous Province of Vojvodina and Autonomous Region of Kosovo and Metohija, decided to merge into Serbia. On 29 November 1945, Yugoslavia was officially proclaimed as federal republic, and in January 1946, after the first Constitution of federal Yugoslavia was adopted, the Federated State of Serbia was renamed to People's Republic of Serbia (Serbo-Croatian: Народна Република Србија / Narodna Republika Srbija).

In November 1946, elections for the Constitutional Assembly of Serbia were held, and in January 1947, Constitution of Serbia was adopted, reaffirming its position within Yugoslav federation, and also regulating the position of autonomous units (Vojvodina as autonomous province; Kosovo and Metohija as autonomous region). In 1953, a constitutional law was adopted, introducing further social reforms.

By that time, internal political life in Serbia was fully dominated by the Communist Party of Serbia, formed in May 1945 as a branch of the ruling Communist Party of Yugoslavia. In order to suppress remaining monarchist opposition, communists initiated the creation of a wider political coalition, thus establishing the People's Front of Yugoslavia (PFY), in August 1945. Other political parties were soon dissolved, and remnants of political life were constrained within the PFY, that was under full control of the ruling Communist Party.

=== Socialist Republic of Serbia ===
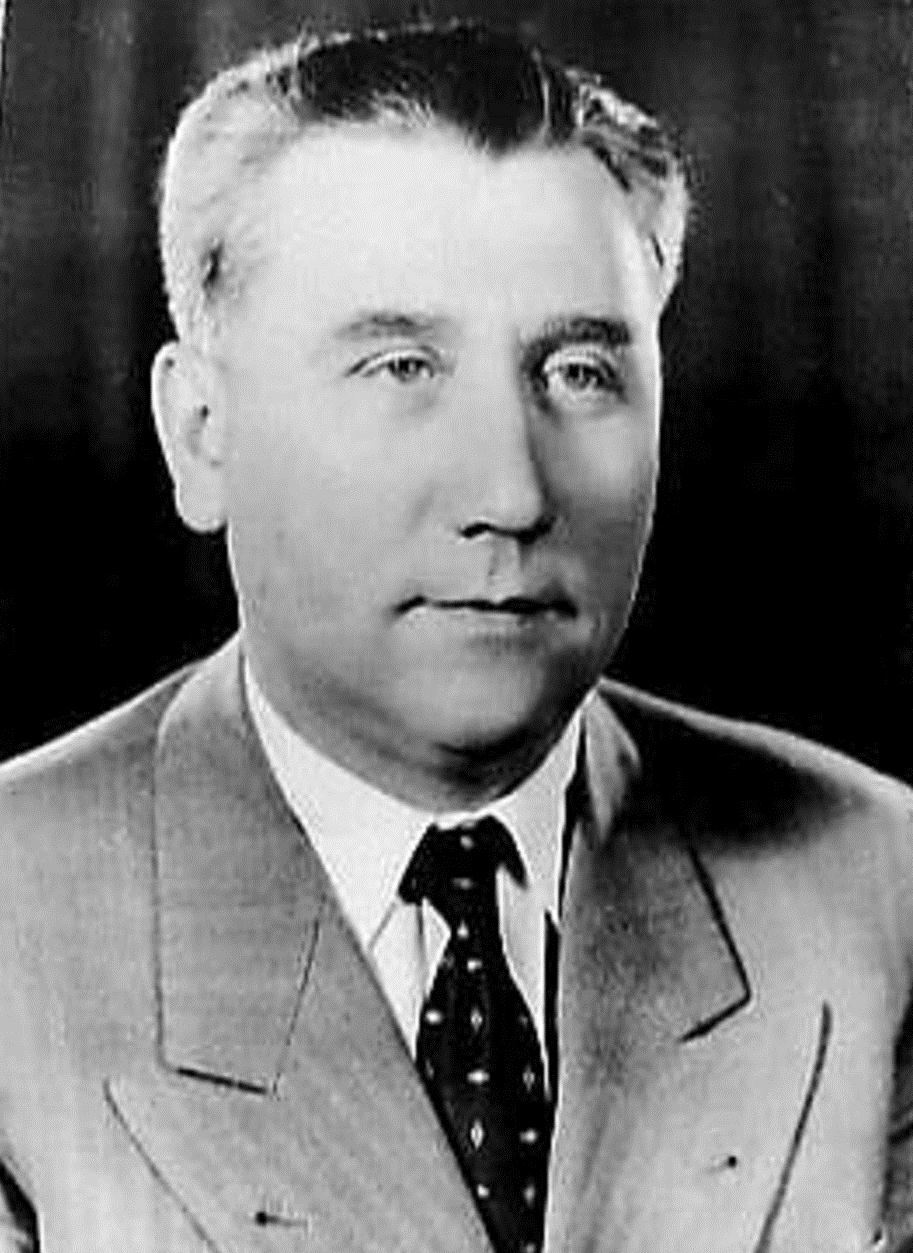
Aleksandar Ranković, vice-president of ASNOS and Peoples's Assembly (1944–1946), and vice-president of Yugoslavia (1963–1966)

In 1963, a new Yugoslav Constitution was adopted, renaming the federal state into the Socialist Federal Republic of Yugoslavia, and its federal units into socialist republics, thus introducing the name: Socialist Republic of Serbia (Serbo-Croatian Cyrillic: Социјалистичка Република Србија).

In 1966, one of the most prominent Serbs in the Communist party and also vice-president of Yugoslavia (1963–1966) and founder of Yugoslav intelligence agency OZNA, Aleksandar Ranković was removed from positions due to allegations of spying on SFRY President Josip Broz Tito.

After the Croatian Spring in 1971, almost whole party leadership of Serbia was removed from office, under the charge of being "liberal". Latinka Perović and Marko Nikezić were marked as leaders of this liberal movement inside League of Communists of Serbia.

In 1974, new constitution was adopted, increasing the powers of provinces, and making them de facto republics. For the first time the institution of president was formed, as President of the Presidency of Socialist Republic of Serbia. Assembly was electing 15 members of the presidency and one president for a 4-year term, and later 2-year term. The new constitution practically suspended Serbia's authority over the provinces.

After the new constitution was adopted, Dragoslav Marković, then President of Serbia ordered a secret study on this issue. In January 1975, the Presidency of the Socialist Republic of Serbia requested a revision of constitutional solutions with explanation that the constitution divided the republic into three parts, thus preventing Serbia from exercising its "historic right to a nation state in the Yugoslav federation". Furthermore, the study Marković requested was completed in 1977 and was named The Blue Book. Although there were differing opinions in the state leadership on the position of the provinces – for example, Edvard Kardelj supported the demands of Serbian leaders – the result of the arbitration was the conclusion that the position of the provinces within Serbia should not be changed. The Federal leadership, led by Tito, believed that the constitutional solution from 1974 could satisfy all the claims of the Socialist Republic of Serbia, but also respect the specifics and special interests of the autonomous provinces. Although the conflict was (temporarily) pacified in this way, the issue remained unresolved.

For most of its existence in the SFRY, Serbia was loyal and generally subordinate to the federal government. This changed after the death of Josip Broz Tito in 1980, when Albanian, as well as Serbian nationalism in Kosovo arose. In 1981, major protests erupted in Kosovo demanding the status of republic. The League of Communists was split on how to respond. At the same time, an economic crisis in Yugoslavia started. The leaders of the country were unable to carry out any reforms due to the political instability.

President of League of Communists of Serbia Slobodan Milošević visited Kosovo in April 1987 and promised rapid action in order to protect peace and the Serbs of Kosovo. Ethnic tensions in Kosovo heated up when a Kosovo Albanian soldier opened fire on his fellow soldiers in Paraćin, in an event known as the Paraćin massacre. Then President of Serbia Ivan Stambolić wanted to make compromise, rather than fast solution. He found himself in a clash with Milošević. This conflict culminated with 8th Session and replacement of Stambolić with Petar Gračanin as President of Serbia.

=== Constitutional reform ===
In 1988, new amendments to the Yugoslav Constitution were adopted, initiating a process of democratization. During 1988 and 1989, a successful round of coups in the Communist party leadership, known as the anti-bureaucratic revolution, in Vojvodina, Kosovo as well as Montenegro, replaced autonomous leaderships in this regions. The coups were led by Slobodan Milošević; supporter of Serbian nationalism. The events were condemned by the communist governments of the western Yugoslav republics (especially SR Slovenia and SR Croatia), who successfully resisted the attempts to expand the revolt onto their territories, and turned against Milošević. The rising antagonism eventually resulted in the dissolution of the ruling League of Communists of Yugoslavia in 1990, and subsequently in the breakup of Yugoslavia.

In 1989, Slobodan Milošević was elected as President of the State Presidency of Serbia. He demanded that the federal Yugoslav government act for the interests of Serbia in Kosovo by sending in the Yugoslav People's Army to suppress separatism in the province. At the same time, several reforms of federal electoral system were proposed, with Serbia supporting a "one-citizen, one-vote" system, which would have given a majority of votes to Serbs. By that time, ethnic tensions in Yugoslavia increased, and the ruling League of Communists of Yugoslavia collapsed, followed by the crisis of federal institutions. After these events, in 1989 Assembly of Socialist Republic of Serbia voted for constitution amendments that revoked high autonomy for provinces of Vojvodina and Kosovo.

After Slovenian authorities forbid a group of Serbs supporting his politics to gather in Ljubljana, Milosević started a trade war with Socialist Republic of Slovenia in late 1989. This Serbian–Slovenian conflict culminated in January 1990 on 14th Congress of the League of Communists of Yugoslavia when Slovenians left the meeting followed by Croatian delegates.

After 1990, the state was known simply as Republic of Serbia (Serbo-Croatian: Република Србија / Republika Srbija), and in December of the same year, Slobodan Milošević was elected as first President of the Republic. In 1992, when the Federal Republic of Yugoslavia was formed, Serbia became one of its two constituent republics. In 2003, this state union was re-formed into Serbia and Montenegro, and in 2006, Serbia restored its independence after Montenegro seceded.

== Politics ==
During the socialist era in Yugoslavia, the only legal political parties were the three branches of the federal League of Communists of Yugoslavia (SKJ): League of Communists of Serbia (SKS), League of Communists of Vojvodina (SKV) and League of Communists of Kosovo (SKK). The Serbian branch remained relatively stable and loyal to the federal party until the late 1980s, when it became split over what action to take in Kosovo when protests and fights broke out between ethnic Albanians and Serbs.

The more traditional Communists supported President Ivan Stambolić, who advocated continued neutrality as a means to solve the dispute; while more radical and nationalist-leaning members supported Slobodan Milosević, who advocated the protection of Kosovo Serbs, who had claimed that their population was being pressured to leave Kosovo by Albanian separatists. Milosević utilized public sentiment and opposition to Kosovo Albanian separatism to rally large numbers of supporters to help him overthrow the Communist leadership in Vojvodina, Kosovo and the Socialist Republic of Montenegro in what was known as the anti-bureaucratic revolution. Afterwards, the Serbian League of Communists selected Milosević as its leader. Milosević took a hard stand on Albanian nationalism in Kosovo and pressured the Yugoslav government to give him emergency powers to deal with Kosovo Albanian separatists. Furthermore, he reduced the autonomy of the autonomous provinces of Kosovo and Vojvodina and installed politicians loyal to him to serve as their representatives.

In the Congress of the Yugoslav League of Communists in 1990, Milosević and his subordinate representatives for Vojvodina, Kosovo and the Socialist Republic of Montenegro attempted to silence opposition from the Socialist Republic of Slovenia who opposed the actions taken against Kosovo Albanian leadership, by blocking all reforms proposed by the Slovene representatives. The tactic failed and Slovenia, along with its ally Croatia, abdicated from the Yugoslav Communist Party. This caused the Yugoslav Communist party to fall apart, and then the state of Yugoslavia itself one year later.

Since 1945, the most senior state official in Serbia, and thus de facto head of state, was President of the People's Assembly of Serbia, who also presided over the collective Presidency of the People's Assembly (1945–1953), and Presidency of the Assembly (1953–1990). In 1974, new Constitution of Serbia was adopted, and collective state presidency was formed, not as a committee of the Assembly, but as a supreme governing body. Since then, President of the Presidency served as the most senior state official of the Socialist Republic of Serbia. At first, President was elected for 4 years mandate, but in 1982 it was lowered to 2 years.

Main executive body, since 1945, was the People's Government of Serbia. In 1953, it was renamed as the Executive Council of Serbia. It served as the executive branch of the People's Assembly. The president of the Executive Council had a role of prime minister.

- List of presidents of Serbia
- Prime Minister of Serbia
- Minister of Internal Affairs (SR Serbia)

=== Administrative divisions ===
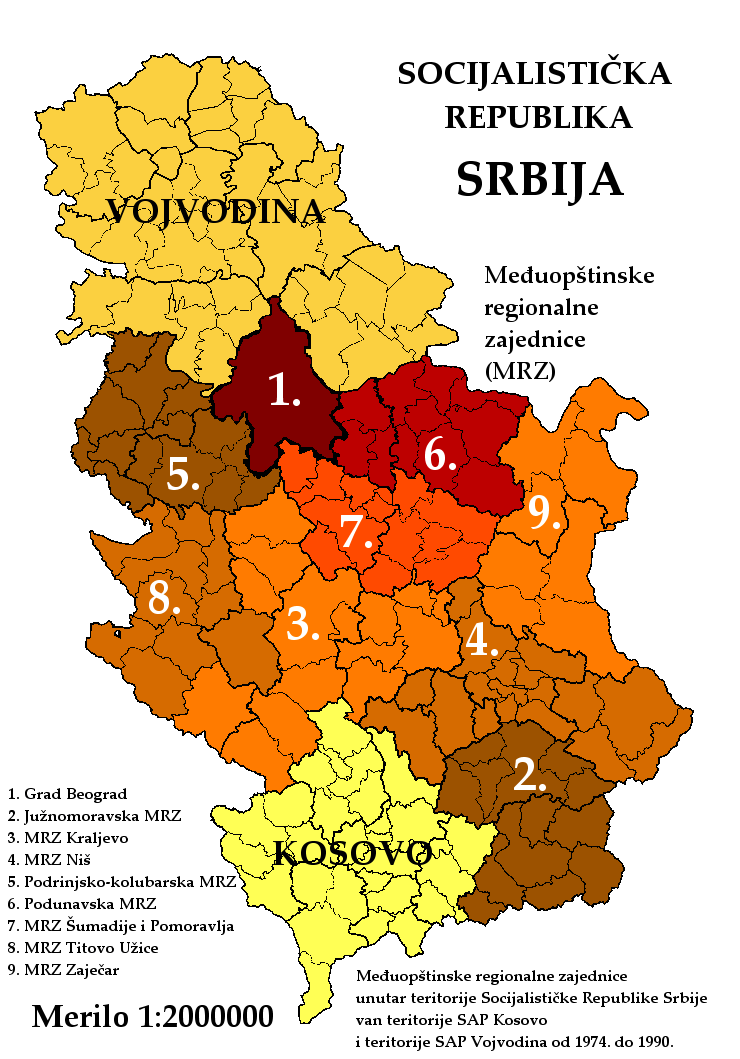
Administrative divisions of the Socialist Republic of Serbia

Within Socialist Republic of Serbia two autonomous provinces existed: Socialist Autonomous Province of Vojvodina and Socialist Autonomous Province of Kosovo. The central part of the Socialist Republic of Serbia located outside of the two autonomous provinces was generally known as "Serbia proper" ("Uža Srbija").

Geographically, Socialist Republic of Serbia bordered Hungary to the north, Romania and Bulgaria to the east and Albania to the south-west. Within Yugoslavia, it bordered SR Macedonia to the south and SR Montenegro, SR Bosnia and Herzegovina and SR Croatia to the west.

== Demographics ==
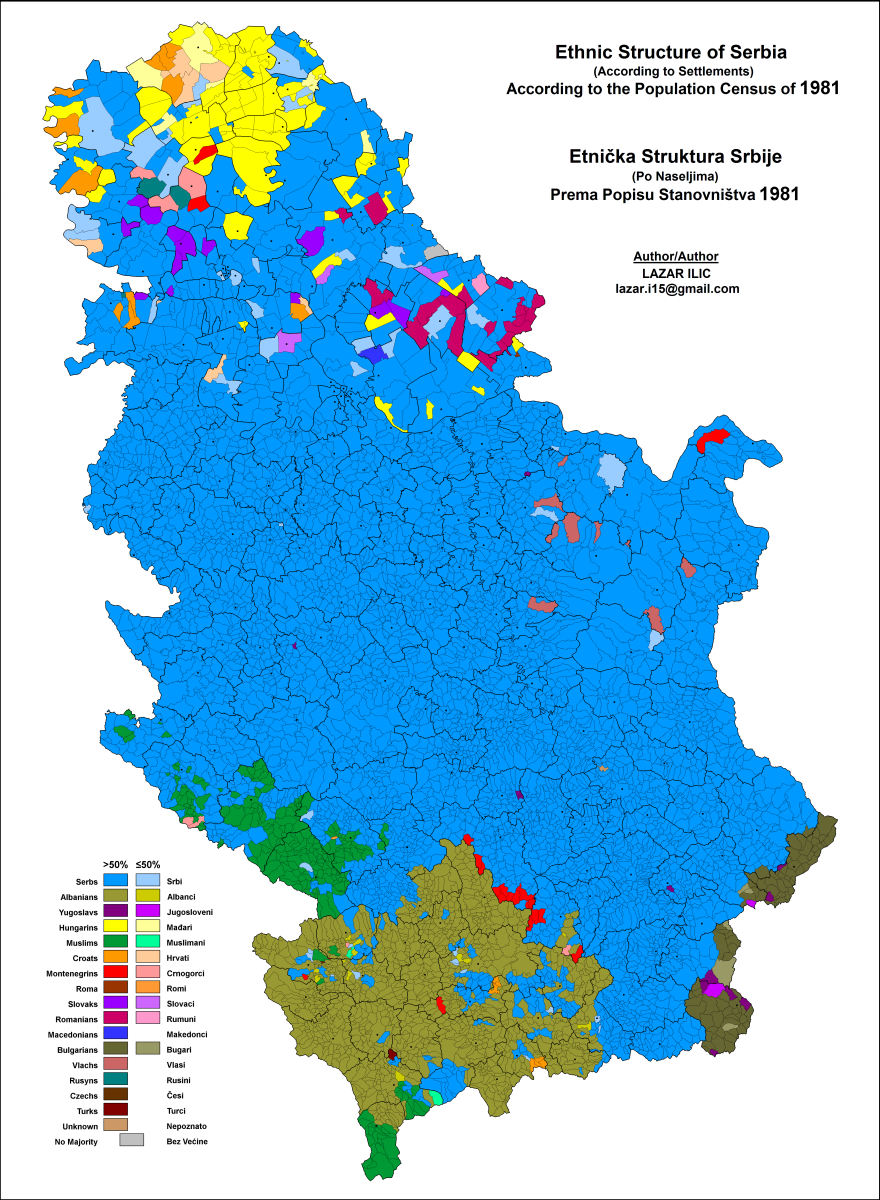
Ethnicity map of the Socialist Republic of Serbia, 1981

=== 1971 census ===
In 1971, total population of the Socialist Republic of Serbia numbered 8,446,590 people, including:

- Serbs = 6,142,070 (72.7%)
- Albanians = 984,761 (11.66%)
- Hungarians = 430,314 (5.10%)
- Croats = 184,913 (2.19%)
- ethnic Muslims = 154,330 (1.83%)
- ethnic Yugoslavs = 123,824 (1.47%)
- Slovaks = 76,733 (0.82%)
- Romanians (self-declared) = 57,419 (0.62%)
- Bulgarians = 53,800 (0.58%)
- Romani = 49,894 (0.54%)
- Macedonians = 42,675 (0.46%)
- Rusyns = 20,608 (0.22%)
- Turks = 18,220 (0.20%)
- Slovenes = 15,957 (0.17%)
- "Vlachs" (Romanians) = 14,724 (0.16%)

=== 1981 census ===
In 1981, total population of the Socialist Republic of Serbia numbered 9,313,677 people, including:

- Serbs = 6,331,527 (67.96%)
- Albanians = 1,303,032 (13.99%)
- Yugoslavs = 441,941 (4.75%)
- Hungarians = 390,468 (4.19%)
- Muslims = 215,166 (2.31%)
- Croats = 149,368 (1.60%)
- Romani = 110,956 (1.19%)
- Macedonians = 48,986 (0.53%)
- Slovenes = 12,006 (0.13%)

== See also ==
- History of Serbia
- History of Yugoslavia

== Sources ==
- Bataković, Dušan T., ed. (2005). Histoire du peuple serbe [History of the Serbian People] (in French). Lausanne: L’Age d’Homme. ISBN 9782825119587.
- Bokovoy, Melissa K.; Irvine, Jill A.; Lilly, Carol S., eds. (1997). State-Society Relations in Yugoslavia, 1945–1992. London: Palgrave Macmillan. ISBN 9780312126902.
- Ćirković, Sima (2004). The Serbs. Malden: Blackwell Publishing. ISBN 9781405142915.
- Cox, John K. (2002). The History of Serbia. Westport, Connecticut: Greenwood Press. ISBN 9780313312908.
- Dimić, Ljubodrag (2005). "Ideology and culture in Yugoslavia (1945-1955)". Velike sile i male države u hladnom ratu 1945–1955: Slučaj Jugoslavije. Beograd: Filozofski fakultet. pp. 303–320.
- Jelavich, Barbara (1983). History of the Balkans: Twentieth Century. Vol. 2. Cambridge University Press. ISBN 9780521274593.
- Miller, Nicholas (2005). "Serbia and Montenegro". Eastern Europe: An Introduction to the People, Lands, and Culture. Vol. 3. Santa Barbara, California: ABC-CLIO. pp. 529–581. ISBN 9781576078006.
- Pavlowitch, Stevan K. (2002). Serbia: The History behind the Name. London: Hurst & Company. ISBN 9781850654773.
- Tomasevich, Jozo (2001). War and Revolution in Yugoslavia, 1941–1945: Occupation and Collaboration. Vol. 2. San Francisco: Stanford University Press. ISBN 9780804779241.
