= Petar Gračanin =

Yugoslav and Serbian politician and general

- Петар Грачанин

12th Federal Secretary of the Interior
- In office 16 May 1989 – 14 July 1992
- Preceded by: Dobroslav Ćulafić
- Succeeded by: Office abolished

President of the Presidium of SR Serbia
- In office 14 December 1987 – 20 March 1989
- Preceded by: Ivan Stambolić
- Succeeded by: Ljubiša Igić (acting)

Personal details
- Born: 22 June 1923 Jagodina, Kingdom of Serbs, Croats and Slovenes (modern Serbia)
- Died: 27 June 2004 (aged 81) Belgrade, Serbia and Montenegro (modern Serbia)
- Party: League of Communists of Yugoslavia (joined in 1941)
- Awards: Order of National Hero of Yugoslavia

Military service
- Allegiance: SFR Yugoslavia; FR Yugoslavia
- Branch/service: Yugoslav People's Army; Ground Forces; Yugoslav Army; Yugoslav Ground Forces (1999)
- Years of service: 1941–1985; 1999
- Rank: Colonel General, JNA; General of the Army, JA
- Battles/wars: World War II

Petar Gračanin (Serbian Cyrillic: Петар Грачанин; 22 June 1923 – 27 June 2004) was a Yugoslav and Serbian politician and general in the Yugoslav People's Army.

== Biography ==
Petar Gračanin was born on 22 June 1923 in Jagodina, then part of the Kingdom of Serbs, Croats and Slovenes.

In July 1941, he joined the Yugoslav Partisans. After the formation of the 2nd Proletarian Brigade, in March 1942, at first he was a member and later the commander of a battalion. He was initiated as a SKOJ member in the League of Communists of Yugoslavia in 1942.

He was promoted to his first military rank in 1943. In 1945, he became Chief of Staff in OZNA for the Morava administrative center. A year later in 1946 he became commander of a tank brigade, Chief of Staff, deputy commander of an armored division and Chief of Staff of School center armored-mechanic units. He graduated from the Higher Military Academy.

At the Federal Secretariat of the People's Defense, he was Chief of the Section, and Chief of Staff of the section for Personal authority. In the 7th Army he was Chief of Staff and deputy commander. He was also Chief of Staff of the Command-headquarters academy, and later he was assigned as commander of the First Army (Yugoslavia). He was chosen as a member of the Central Committee of the League of Communists of Yugoslavia (CK SKJ) in 1978 and 1982.

He was promoted to the rank of major general in 1970, lieutenant general in 1974, and colonel general in 1978. He was Chief of the General Staff of Yugoslav People's Army from 5 May 1982 to 1 September 1985.

His active military service ended on 31 December 1985. After that he was in high state positions such as: President of Presidium of SR Serbia (1987–89) and then Federal Secretary of the Interior (1989–92).

During the Ten-Day War Gračanin was situated in a JNA air base near Ljubljana. After the JNA forces were ordered by the General Staff to withdraw from Slovenia, Gračanin flew back to Belgrade.

Slobodan Milošević promoted him to the rank of reserve general of the army of the FR Yugoslavia in 1999.

He died in Belgrade on 27 June 2004, aged 81, and was buried in the Alley of Distinguished Citizens at Belgrade's New Cemetery.

Military offices
Preceded by Branko Mamula	Chief of the General Staff of the Yugoslav People's Army; 5 May 1982 – 1 September 1985	Succeeded by Zorko Čanadi
Political offices
Preceded by Ivan Stambolić	President of the Presidency of the Socialist Republic of Serbia; 14 December 1987 – 20 March 1989	Succeeded by Slobodan Milošević as President of Serbia post transformed
