= Dušan Čkrebić =

Serbian politician (1927–2022)

- Душан Чкребић
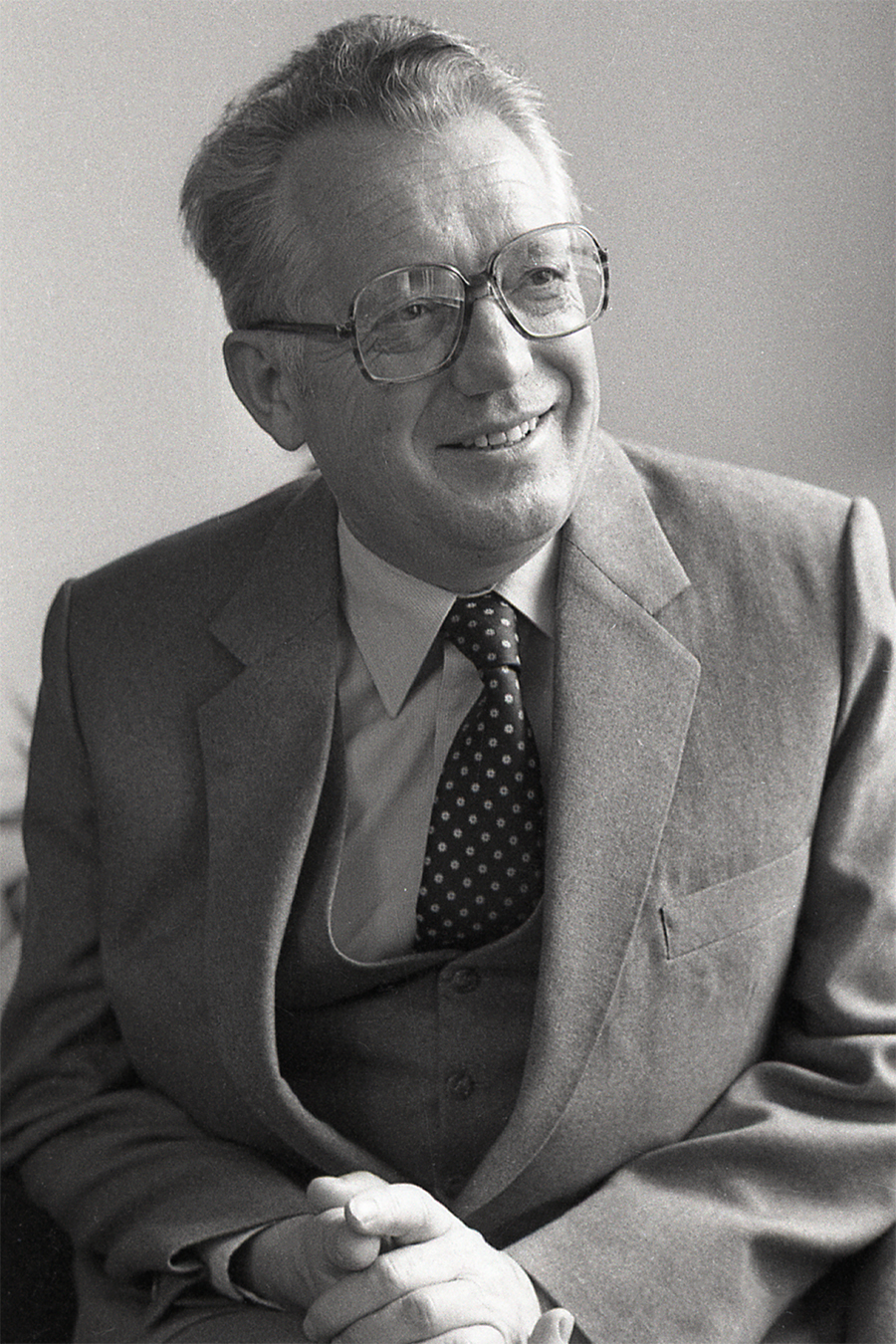
- Dušan Čkrebić

President of the Presidium of SR Serbia
- In office 5 May 1984 – 5 May 1986
- Preceded by: Nikola Ljubičić
- Succeeded by: Ivan Stambolić

President of the Presidency of the League of Communists of Serbia
- In office 29 May 1982 – 17 May 1984
- Secretary: Radiša Gačić
- Preceded by: Tihomir Vlaškalić
- Succeeded by: Ivan Stambolić

President of the Assembly of the Socialist Republic of Serbia
- In office 5 May 1978 – 28 April 1982
- Preceded by: Nikola Ljubičić
- Succeeded by: Ivan Stambolić

President of the Executive Council of the Socialist Republic of Serbia
- In office 6 May 1974 – 6 May 1978
- Preceded by: Milenko Bojanić
- Succeeded by: Ivan Stambolić

Personal details
- Born: 7 August 1927 Niš, Kingdom of Serbs, Croats and Slovenes
- Died: 7 April 2022 (aged 94) Belgrade, Serbia
- Party: League of Communists of Yugoslavia

Dušan Čkrebić (Serbian Cyrillic: Душан Чкребић; 7 August 1927 – 7 April 2022) was a Serbian politician who served as the Prime Minister, President of the Assembly and President of the Presidium of the Socialist Republic of Serbia.

== Biography ==
Čkrebić was born in Niš, Kingdom of Serbs, Croats and Slovenes on 7 August 1927, and he served in the 1st Proletarian Brigade of the Yugoslav Partisans during World War II.

In 1947, he began studying aeronautics in the Soviet Union, and he became the general manager of a soda factory in Lukavac in 1958. From 1974 to 1978, he served as Prime Minister of SR Serbia, and then as President of the Assembly from 1978 to 1982.

In 1982, he became a member of the Central Committee of the League of Communists of Yugoslavia.

Following Milošević's purge of the League of Communists of Serbia and unconstitutional consolidation of power within the republic in 1987, the Central Committee of the League of Communists of Yugoslavia responded by holding confidence votes in 1988. Čkrebić, widely viewed as a Milošević ally, was the only sitting member to lose his vote of no confidence; he thereafter resigned from the Committee. Milošević himself was exempt from facing a similar vote because he held leadership over the League of Communists of Serbia. Čkrebić thus retired from politics in 1990.

Čkrebić died on 7 April 2022.
