= Ivan Stambolić =

Serbian politician (1936–2000)

- Иван Стамболић
- Stambolić in 1986

President of the Presidency of SR Serbia
- In office 5 May 1986 – 14 December 1987
- Preceded by: Dušan Čkrebić
- Succeeded by: Petar Gračanin

President of the Presidency of the League of Communists of Serbia
- In office 17 May 1984 – 31 May 1986
- Secretary: Radiša Gačić
- Preceded by: Dušan Čkrebić
- Succeeded by: Slobodan Milošević

President of the Executive Council of the Socialist Republic of Serbia
- In office 6 May 1978 – 5 May 1982
- Preceded by: Dušan Čkrebić
- Succeeded by: Branislav Ikonić

Personal details
- Born: 5 November 1936 Brezova, Ivanjica, Kingdom of Yugoslavia
- Died: 25 August 2000 (aged 63) Fruška Gora, Serbia, FR Yugoslavia
- Cause of death: Assassination
- Resting place: Topčider Cemetery, Topčider
- Party: SKJ (until 1990)
- Spouse(s): Katarina "Kaća" Stambolić; née Živojinović (m. 1962)
- Children: 3
- Relatives: Petar Stambolić (uncle)
- Education: University of Belgrade

Ivan Stambolić (Serbian: Иван Стамболић; 5 November 1936 – 25 August 2000) was a Serbian politician who served as the president of the League of Communists of Serbia (SKS) from 1984 to 1986. A prominent member of SKS, he also served as prime minister of Serbia from 1978 to 1982 and as president of Serbia from 1986 to 1987.

Stambolić was the mentor of Slobodan Milošević whom he also nominated as his successor to the position of the president of SKS. Milošević would, however, adopt populist positions and dismiss Stambolić and his allies in 1987. Stambolić then largely retired from politics. In the leadup to the 2000 election, where he planned to run against Milošević, however, Stambolić disappeared. Later investigations found that he was assassinated on the orders of Milošević.

== Early life ==
Born in village of Brezova near Ivanjica, he was the son of Milunka Stambolić and Miodrag Stambolić. His mother, Milunka, was the sister of Petar Stambolić. Stambolić graduated from the University of Belgrade's Law School.

== Career ==
As early as 1982, Stambolić insisted that he would speak up for the rights of Serbs and Montenegrins in Kosovo, even if his opponents labelled him a Greater Serbian nationalist.

In May 1986, he became the President of Serbia. He was a mentor and a close personal friend to Slobodan Milošević, and supported him in the elections for the new leader of the League of Communists of Serbia, to the dismay of the other leaders in the party. Stambolić spent three days advocating Milošević's election and finally managed to secure him a tight victory, the tightest ever in the history of Serbian Communist Party internal elections.

Stambolić and Milošević held similar views on the autonomous provinces of Serbia, Kosovo and Vojvodina, both feeling that constitutional changes were necessary to sort out their relationship with the centre. Stambolić managed to win over the League of Communists of Yugoslavia to his position on this matter at the Thirteenth Congress of the LCY, held in 1986, and then set up a commission to work out the details of the constitutional reforms. Where Milošević and Stambolić differed on these matters was Milošević's demand for greater rapidity. It was the issue of speed that was to bring the two into conflict.

Stambolić and the Serbian government joined the federal Yugoslav government in harshly condemning the controversial Memorandum of the Serbian Academy of Sciences and Arts of 1986 for inciting nationalism. Stambolić said: "We [communist party leaders] do not accept the Memorandum’s call for Serbia to turn its back on its own future and the future of Yugoslavia, for it to arbitrarily accuse the proven leaders of the revolution and of socialist development, for Serbian Communists to be seen as the illegitimate leaders of the working class and people of Serbia".

Dragiša Pavlović, Milošević's fairly liberal successor at the head of the Belgrade Committee of the party, opposed his policy towards the solving of the issues of the Kosovo Serbs, calling it "hastily promised speed". Milošević denounced Pavlović as being soft on Albanian radicals, contrary to advice from Stambolić. On 23/24 September 1987, at the subsequent eighth session of the Central Committee, one that lasted around 30 hours, and was broadcast live on the state television, Milošević had Pavlović deposed, to the utter embarrassment of Stambolić, who resigned under pressure from Milošević's supporters a few days later.

In December 1987, Stambolić was officially voted off the position and replaced by Petar Gračanin, who was in turn succeeded the following year by Milošević himself. The anti-bureaucratic revolution escalated in 1988 and the changes to the Serbian constitution were passed in 1989. The subsequent 14th Congress of the LCY in early 1990 was dominated by the clash over these centralization policies and ultimately led to the breakup of the party and the breakup of Yugoslavia.

Stambolić retired from politics but remained in contact with opposition politicians during Milošević's rule in the 1990s.

== Disappearance and death ==
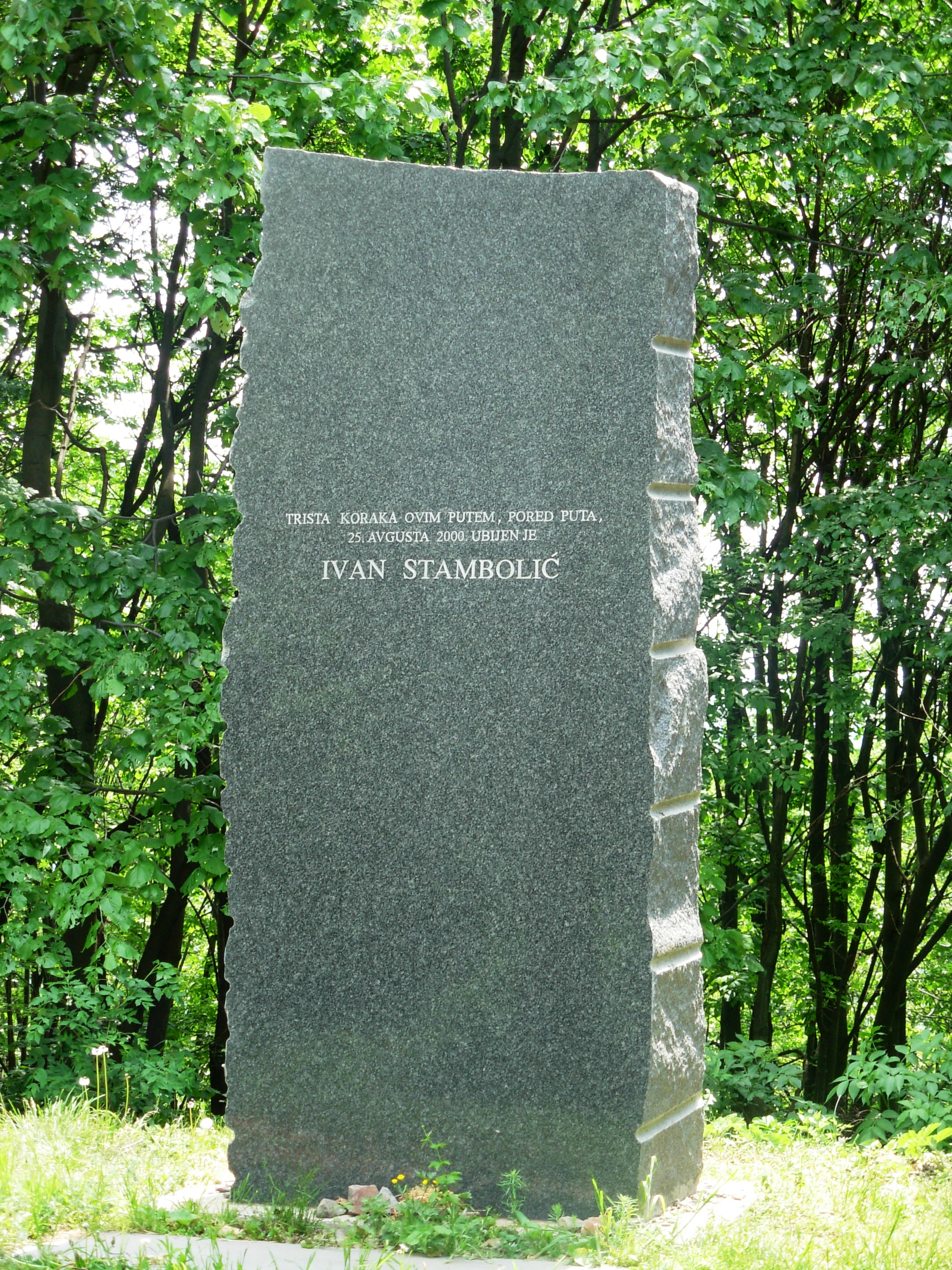
Monument near Stambolić's place of death on Fruška Gora

Stambolić was persuaded by the Democratic Opposition of Serbia to run against Milošević in the September 2000 general election, however, he disappeared on 25 August 2000, still during the rule of Slobodan Milošević.

Stambolić's mysterious disappearance was resolved on 28 March 2003, when the police revealed that he was murdered on Fruška Gora by eight Special Operations Unit officers.

On 18 July 2005, these men and their co-conspirators were found guilty of the murder of Stambolić and were sentenced to between 15 and 40 years in prison. The court found that the order for Stambolić's murder came from Slobodan Milošević.

== See also ==
- List of kidnappings
- List of solved missing person cases (2000s)

Political offices
Preceded by Dušan Čkrebić	President of the Executive Council of the Socialist Republic of Serbia; 6 May 1978–5 May 1982	Succeeded by Branislav Ikonić
Preceded by Dušan Čkrebić	Chairman of the League of Communists of Serbia; 1984–May 1986	Succeeded by Slobodan Milošević
Preceded by Dušan Čkrebić	President of the Presidency of the Socialist Republic of Serbia; 5 May 1986–14 December 1987	Succeeded by Petar Gračanin
