= Dobrivoje Vidić =

Serbian politician

Lieutenant colonel Dobrivoje Vidić GCVO
- Добривоје Видић
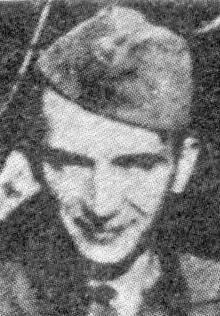
- Vidić as a member of the Partisans in 1942, during the Bihać Republic

President of the Presidium of SR Serbia
- In office 5 May 1978 – 5 May 1982
- Preceded by: Dragoslav Marković
- Succeeded by: Nikola Ljubičić

Personal details
- Born: 24 December 1918 Čačak, Kingdom of SCS
- Died: 3 March 1992 (aged 73) Belgrade, SFR Yugoslavia
- Party: League of Communists of Yugoslavia
- Awards

Dobrivoje Vidić (Serbian Cyrillic: Добривоје Видић; 24 December 1918 – 3 March 1992) was a Serbian politician and diplomat who served as the President of the Presidium of SR Serbia (the precursor to the post of President of Serbia) from 5 May 1978 to 5 May 1982.

He additionally served as Yugoslav ambassador to Burma (1952–1953), Soviet Union (1953–1956 and 1965–1969), United Nations (1958–1960) and United Kingdom (1970–1973).

== Controversies ==
According to the newspaper Blic, during 1941 Vidić worked as a translator for the Germans in Užice, and at the end of 1944, as the secretary of the KPY for the Užice district, he decided to shoot Andrija Mirković, the former mayor of Užice.

Political offices
Preceded by Dragoslav Marković	President of the Presidency of the Socialist Republic of Serbia; 1978–1982	Succeeded by Nikola Ljubičić
