= Milentije Popović =

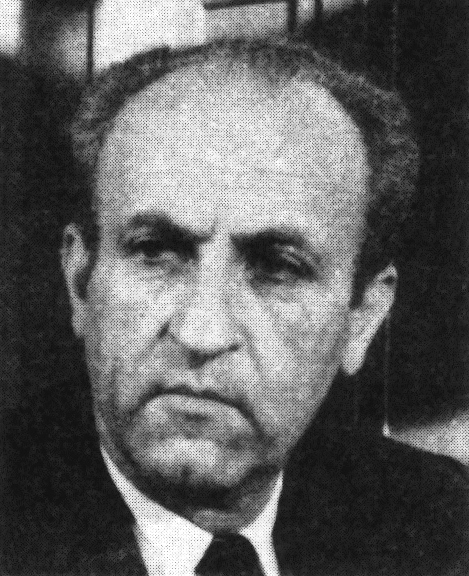
Milentije Popović

Milentije Popović (Serbian Cyrillic: Милентије Поповић, pronounced [pǒpoʋit͡ɕ]; 1913 – 1971) was a member of Communist Party of Yugoslavia (KPJ) since 1939. During World War II he held various Party and administrative positions. After the war, he became the Minister of interior affairs, trade and supplies, and then Minister of foreign trade and finance in Yugoslav federal government.

He was born in Crna Trava. He died while President of the Federal Assembly of the Socialist Federal Republic of Yugoslavia, a position he held from May 16, 1967 to May 8, 1971.

He published a number of tracts and articles on economy problems, development of socialist democracy, and on other subjects.
