= Nikola Ljubičić =

President of Serbia

- Никола Љубичић
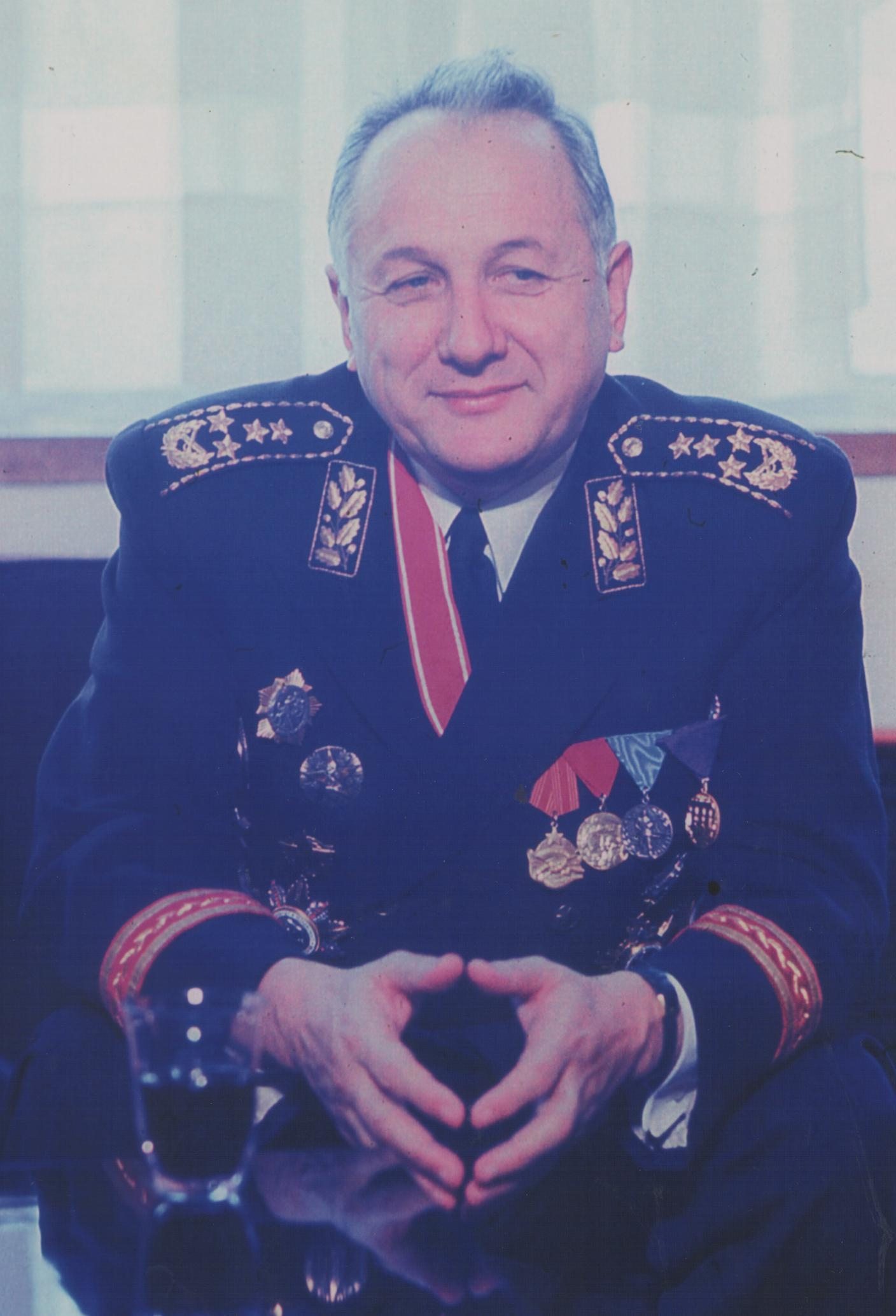

President of the Presidency of SR Serbia
- In office 5 May 1982 – 5 May 1984
- Preceded by: Dobrivoje Vidić
- Succeeded by: Dušan Čkrebić

3rd Federal Secretary of People's Defense
- In office 18 May 1967 – 5 May 1982
- President: Josip Broz Tito
- Preceded by: Ivan Gošnjak
- Succeeded by: Branko Mamula

2nd Serbian Representative in the Yugoslav Presidency
- In office 15 May 1984 – 15 May 1989
- Preceded by: Petar Stambolić
- Succeeded by: Borisav Jović

Personal details
- Born: 4 April 1916 Karan near Užice, Kingdom of Serbia
- Died: 13 April 2005 (aged 89) Belgrade, Serbia and Montenegro
- Party: SKJ; League of Communists - Movement for Yugoslavia
- Spouse: Vera Ljubičić
- Awards: Order of National Hero of Yugoslavia

Military service
- Allegiance: Socialist Federal Republic of Yugoslavia
- Branch/service: Yugoslav People's Army
- Years of service: 1941–1982
- Rank: General of the Army
- Commands: Yugoslav People's Army
- Battles/wars: World War II

Nikola Ljubičić (Serbian Cyrillic: Никола Љубичић; 4 April 1916 – 13 April 2005) was the President of the Presidency of Serbia (1982–1984), a member of the Presidency of the Socialist Federal Republic of Yugoslavia (1984–1989), and the Minister of Defence of Yugoslavia (1967–1982). He received numerous medals both from Yugoslavia and abroad, including the Order of the National Hero of Yugoslavia.

== Biography ==
Ljubičić was born in the village of Karan, near Užice. He fought in World War II in Josip Broz Tito's Yugoslav partisan movement and was proclaimed a Yugoslav national hero on 27 November 1953 for his actions in the war.

Nikola Ljubičić joined the Partisabs at the start of war in Yugoslavia in 1941. During the war, he was put in charge of numerous units, moving through the ranks of the Partisan army. He commanded several Partisan units, including the Fifth Šumadija Battalion and the Fourth Užice Battalion of the Second Proletarian Brigade, and was wounded twice during fighting with Axis forces. In 1943, he was sent from Bosnia to Serbia with a small group and later commanded the Third Serbian Brigade. In 1944, he became Chief of Staff of the Second Proletarian Division and participated in the final Partisan operations leading to the liberation of Yugoslavia.

He served as Federal Secretary of National Defense from 1967 to 1982. He was elected a member of the Federal Assembly from 1963 to 1967. At the Eighth Congress of the Communist Party of Yugoslavia, he was elected a member of the Central Committee, and at the Ninth, Tenth and Eleventh Congress, he was elected a member of the Presidency. From 1982 to 1984, he served as the President of the Presidency of Serbia. He was a member of the Presidency of the Socialist Federal Republic of Yugoslavia (1984–1989), and the Minister of Defence of Yugoslavia (1967–1982).

He graduated from the Military Academy in 1950 in Belgrade, and was then appointed commander of the corps in Zagreb, Ljubljana and Kragujevac. After that, he served as Assistant Commander of the First Army of the Political and Legal Sector; Commander of the Border Units of Yugoslavia; Chief of the War School and Commander of the First Army Region.

He retired from the Yugoslav People's Army as a four-star General of the Army and Minister of Defence. He died in Belgrade on 13 April 2005, aged 89, and was buried with full military honors in the Alley of Distinguished Citizens of the New Cemetery in Belgrade. He died just 7 days before the death of the first President of the Presidency of Serbia Dragoslav Marković.

There are a number of publications on his work such as the Total National Defence – Strategy for Peace (published in 1977 in numerous languages, including English, Arabic, Russian and Serbo-Croatian), and his own memoirs of World War II in the book "U Titovoj koloni" ("Marching with Tito"; published in 2006).

== See also ==
- League of Communists Organisation in the Yugoslav People's Army

Political offices
Preceded by Ivan Gošnjak	Federal Secretary of People's Defence of Yugoslavia; 18 May 1967 – 5 May 1982	Succeeded by Branko Mamula
Preceded by Dobrivoje Vidić	President of the Presidency of the Socialist Republic of Serbia; 5 May 1982 – 5 May 1984	Succeeded by Dušan Čkrebić
