= Order of People's Liberation =

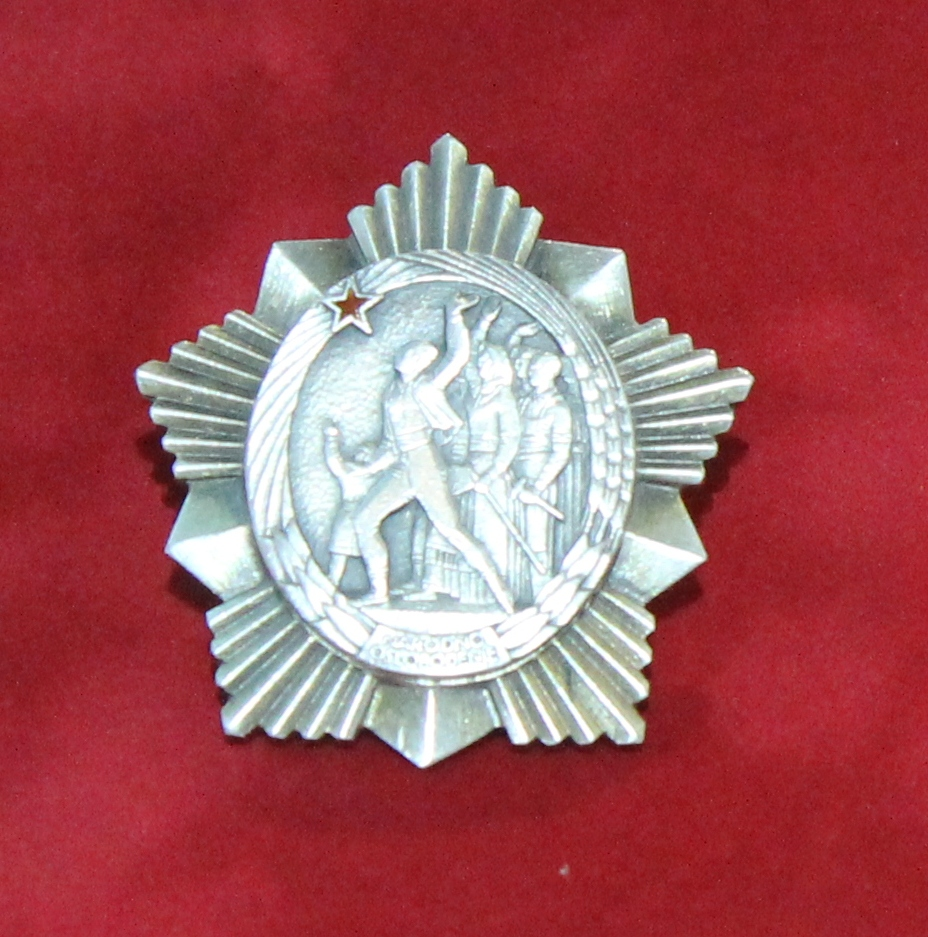
- Post-1945 badge of the order
- Type: Order
- Awarded for: Outstanding contribution in organizing and directing the uprising and the creation and development of the Socialist Federal Republic of Yugoslavia
- Country: Yugoslavia
- Eligibility: Participants of the People's Liberation War
- Campaign: World War II in Yugoslavia
- Status: Dissolved
- Established: 15 August 1943

Highlights
- Total: 299 (before 1970)
- Ribbon of the order

Precedence
- Next (higher): Order of the Hero of Socialist Labour
- Next (lower): Order of the War Banner

The Order of People's Liberation or Order of National Liberation (Serbo-Croatian: Orden narodnog oslobođenja, Орден народног ослобођења; Slovene: Red ljudske osvoboditve) was a decoration of the Socialist Federal Republic of Yugoslavia, the fifth-highest decoration in the series of Yugoslav decorations. The order was founded by Josip Broz Tito's main Headquarters on 15 August 1943. It was awarded for "outstanding contribution in organizing and directing the uprising and the creation and development of the Socialist Federal Republic of Yugoslavia". The insignia of the order was designed by Croatian sculptor Antun Augustinčić in 1945. It is in the form of a badge worn on the left of the chest.

== History ==
Order of the People's Liberation was among the six orders established by the Supreme Headquarters of the NOV i POJ during the World War II on 15 August 1943 by a Decree signed by Tito. It was the third highest order. According to the Decreed, the Order of People's Liberation was to be awarded "for the merits in the people's liberation". During the war, the insignia of the order was produced in the Soviet Union.

State decorations were formalized in the Law on orders and decorations of 1945. According to the Law, the Order of People's Liberation had one class and was the fourth highest order, beside the orders of People's Hero, Freedom (new), and Partisan Star 1st class. In 1945, the Soviet-produced insignia was abandoned for the new design by sculptor Antun Augustinčić. In March 1945, the Presidium of the National Assembly informed all persons who were awarded the Order of Liberation before its formalization that they can request new-style insignia of the order instead of the old insignia.

The Statute of the Order was adopted in 1946 by the Presidium of the National Assembly. The Statute stipulated that the Order of People's Liberation could be awarded to "distinguished military commanders, or political or public workers who distinguished themselves in the struggle for people's liberation, in the formation of Socialist Yugoslavia, or in the building of people's democracy."

In 1948, new Order of the Hero of Socialist Labour was established, and in 1954, new highest order, the Order of the Yugoslav Star, was established, so from then on, the Order of People's Liberation was fifth highest order, behind the orders of the Yugoslav Star, Freedom, People's Hero, and the Hero of Socialist Labour.

As of 31 December 1968, the Order of People's Liberation was awarded 299 times. Before the breakup of Yugoslavia, it was awarded to 262 Yugoslav citizens and 21 foreign citizens. The rest were awarded to different military units, organizations, etc.

== Notable recipients ==
- On 20 December 1944, the Order of the People's Liberation was awarded to:
  - Josip Vidmar
  - Vojislav Kecmanović
  - Niko Miljanić
  - Metodija Andonov-Čento
  - Siniša Stanković
- On 12 January 1945, the Order of the People's Liberation was awarded to, among others:
  - Jože Brilej
  - Ivan Maček
  - Vladimir Dedijer
  - Hasan Brkić
  - Radovan Zogović
  - Osman Karabegović
  - Avdo Humo
- On 17 January 1945, the Order of the People's Liberation was awarded to, among others:
  - Cvijetin Mijatović
- On 29 January 1945, the Order of the People's Liberation was awarded to, among others:
  - France Bevk
  - Boris Kidrič
  - Edvard Kocbek
  - Franc Leskošek
  - Miha Marinko
- On 26 February 1945, the Order of the People's Liberation was awarded to, among others:
  - Josip Broz Tito
  - Ivan Ribar
  - Vladimir Bakarić
  - Sreten Žujović
  - Edvard Kardelj
  - Josip Smodlaka
  - Frane Frol
  - Emanuel Čučkov
  - Antun Augustinčić
  - Spasenija Babović
  - Dimitar Vlahov
  - Sreten Vukosavljević
  - Pavle Gregorić
  - Milovan Djilas
  - Filip Lakuš
  - Moma Marković
  - Moša Pijade
  - Aleksandar Ranković
  - Rodoljub Čolaković
- On 6 March 1945, the Order of the People's Liberation was awarded to, among others:
  - Fadil Hoxha
  - Emin Duraku
- Patriarch Alexy I of Moscow - awarded on 23 April 1945
- On 6 July 1945, the Order of the People's Liberation was awarded to, among others:
  - Miloš Minić
  - Dušan Petrović Šane
  - Milentije Popović
  - Koča Popović
- On 11 July 1945, the Order of the People's Liberation was awarded to, among others:
  - Peko Dapčević
  - Svetozar Vukmanović
  - Mitar Bakić
- On 26 July 1945, the Order of the People's Liberation was awarded to, among others:
  - Ivan Gošnjak
  - Vlado Šegrt
- Edward Osóbka-Morawski - awarded on 17 March 1946
- Zdeněk Fierlinger - awarded on 10 May 1946
- In June 1946, the Order of the People's Liberation was awarded to:
  - Nikolai Bulganin
  - Aleksandr Vasilevsky
  - Nikolay Voronov
  - Nikolai Dmitriyevich Yakovlev
  - Mikhail Vorobyov
  - Ivan Peresypkin
  - Nikolai Kuznetsov
  - Ivan Isakov
  - Vlado Janić
- In May 1947, the Order of the People's Liberation was awarded to, among others:
  - Ivan Rukavina
  - Veljko Kovačević
- Georgi Dimitrov - awarded on 28 July 1947 (the last foreign national to be awarded)
- Oton Župančič - awarded on 23 January 1948
- On 28 November 1953, the Order of the People's Liberation was awarded to, among others:
  - Ali Šukrija
  - Ljubo Babić
  - Džemal Bijedić
  - Pepca Kardelj
  - Stane Kavčič
  - Sergej Kraigher
  - Draža Marković
  - Marko Nikezić
  - Pavle Savić
- In December 1954, the Order of the People's Liberation was awarded to, among others:
  - Anka Berus
  - Jakov Blažević
  - Zvonko Brkić
  - Većeslav Holjevac
  - Nikola Kovačević
  - Mitra Mitrović
  - Dušan Mugoša
  - Đuro Salaj
  - Dragi Stamenković
  - Vida Tomšič
  - Veljko Vlahović
- On 29 April 1954, the Order of the People's Liberation was awarded to, among others:
  - Stevan Doronjski
  - Petar Relić
- Borko Temelkovski - awarded on 31 July 1969
- Nikola Ljubičić - awarded in December 1973
- Franjo Herljević - awarded on 24 November 1975
- Nisim Albahari - awarded on 19 January 1976
- Mihailo Apostolski - awarded on 25 November 1976
- Aleš Bebler - awarded on 6 June 1977 (second time)
- Vladimir Velebit - awarded on 1 June 1978
- Vladimir Sudets - awarded in 1979
- Jože Brilej - awarded on 18 January 1980
- Filip Bajković - awarded on 23 July 1980
- Petar Matić Dule - awarded on 6 November 1980
- Sinan Hasani - awarded on 8 June 1982
- Milutin Morača- awarded on 1 November 1985

Beside persons, the order was awarded to numerous military units and institutions of the Yugoslav People's Army, a ship, a newspaper, and to the island of Vis.

== See also ==
- Orders, decorations, and medals of the Socialist Federal Republic of Yugoslavia

== Sources ==
- General Encyclopedia. Yugoslav Lexicographical Institute. Zagreb. 1980. (in Serbo-Croatian)
- Prister, Boris. Odlikovanja. Povijesni muzej hrvatske. Zagreb. 1984. (in Serbo-Croatian)
