= Sergej Kraigher =

Yugoslav communist politician (1914–2001)

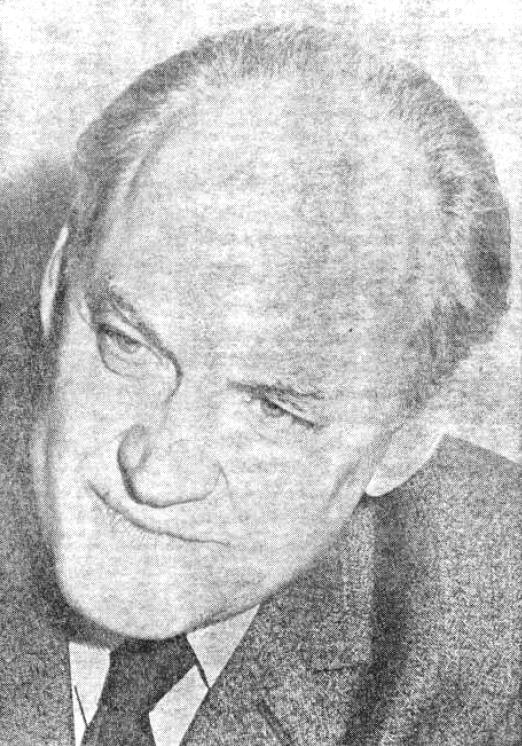
- Kraigher in 1969

3rd President of the Presidency of Yugoslavia
- In office 15 May 1981 – 15 May 1982
- Prime Minister: Veselin Đuranović
- Preceded by: Cvijetin Mijatović
- Succeeded by: Petar Stambolić

9th President of the Presidency of SR Slovenia
- In office May 1974 – May 1979
- Prime Minister: Andrej Marinc; Anton Vratuša
- Succeeded by: Viktor Avbelj

6th President of the People's Assembly of SR Slovenia
- In office 1967–1973
- Prime Minister: Janko Smole; Stane Kavčić; Andrej Marinc
- Preceded by: Ivan Maček
- Succeeded by: Tone Kropušek
- Preceded by: Marjan Brecelj (as President of the People's Assembly of SR Slovenia)

Personal details
- Born: 30 May 1914 Adelsberg, Austria-Hungary
- Died: 17 January 2001 (aged 86) Ljubljana, Slovenia
- Party: SKJ

Sergej Kraigher (30 May 1914 – 17 January 2001) was a Yugoslav communist politician from Slovenia who served as the President of the Presidency of Yugoslavia from 1981 to 1982.

== Biography ==
Kraigher was born in Postojna, Austria-Hungary, modern-day Slovenia. His uncle, Jurij Kraigher was a prominent American civil and war pilot. His other uncle, Alojz Kraigher, was a prominent writer and left-wing activist, while his cousin Boris also became an influential communist politician in post-war Yugoslavia.

Kraigher rose through the ranks of the Communist Party of Slovenia in the 1940s, and fought with the partisan resistance during World War II. After the war he served as Governor of the National Bank of Yugoslavia between 1951 and 1953, and then as director of the Federal Institute for Economic Planning and Secretary of State for Foreign Trade. Kraigher became chairman of the People's Assembly of Slovenia in 1967 and held that position until 1974, after which he served as President of the Presidency of Slovenia until 1979. Following the death of Edvard Kardelj, Kraigher became the Slovenian member of the collective Presidency of Yugoslavia and served as its 3rd President from 1981 to 1982, after the death of Josip Broz Tito.

He is also known for being the chairman of the Kraigher Commission, which was set up by the Yugoslav government to advise and give proposals in solving the Yugoslav economic crisis which started to develop in the early to mid-1980s. The commission report was the basis of a reform package that was to be implemented by the Milka Planinc cabinet, but never materialized.

Kraigher died in Ljubljana, Slovenia on 17 January 2001, at the age of 86.

== Honours and awards ==
=== National honours ===
- Order of People's Liberation (28 November 1953)
- Order of the Hero of Socialist Labour (14 March 1974)

=== Foreign honours ===
- Grand Cross of the Order of the Sun of Peru (12 November 1980)

Political offices
Preceded by Cvijetin Mijatović	President of the Presidency of Yugoslavia; 1981–1982	Succeeded by Petar Stambolić
Preceded by Marjan Brecelj as President of the People's Assembly of SR Slovenia	President of the Presidency of SR Slovenia; 1974–1979	Succeeded by Viktor Avbelj
Preceded by Ivan Maček	President of the People's Assembly of SR Slovenia; 1967–1973	Succeeded by Tone Kropušek
