= Polje District =

Polje District Četrtna skupnost Polje
- District
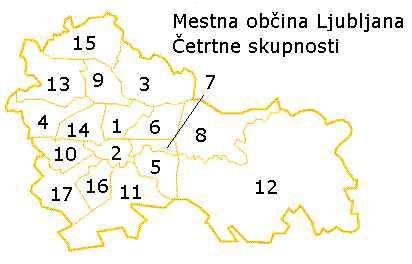
- Map of districts in Ljubljana. The Polje District is number 8.

- Location in Slovenia
- Coordinates: 46°3′28.69″N 14°35′0.52″E
- Country: Slovenia
- Traditional region: Upper Carniola
- Statistical region: Central Slovenia
- Municipality: Ljubljana

Area
  - Total: 22.10 km^{2} (8.53 sq mi)

Population (2014)
  - Total: 19,433

The Polje District (pronounced [ˈpoːljɛ]; Slovene: Četrtna skupnost Polje), or simply Polje, is a district (mestna četrt) of the City Municipality of Ljubljana, the capital of Slovenia. It is named after the former village of Polje.

== Geography ==
The Polje District is bounded on the west by the A1 Freeway, on the north by the Sava River, and on the east and south by the Ljubljanica River. The district includes the former villages of Polje, Slape, Spodnja Zadobrova, Spodnji Kašelj, Vevče, Zalog, Zgornja Zadobrova, and Zgornji Kašelj.
