= Marjan Rožanc =

Slovenian writer

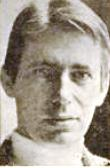
- Born: 21 November 1930; Devica Marija v Polju, Drava Banovina, Kingdom of Yugoslavia (now part of Ljubljana, Slovenia)
- Died: 18 September 1990 (aged 59); Ljubljana, Republic of Slovenia, SFR Yugoslavia
- Occupations: Writer, essayist, playwright

Marjan Rožanc (pronounced [ˈmáːɾjan ɾɔˈʒàːnts]; 21 November 1930 – 18 September 1990) was a Slovenian author, playwright, and journalist. He is mostly known for his essays, and is considered one of the foremost essayists in Slovene, along with Ivan Cankar, Jože Javoršek, and Drago Jančar, and as a great master of style.

He was born in the village of Devica Marija v Polju (now part of the Polje District, Ljubljana), Slovenia (then part of the Kingdom of Yugoslavia). He attended high school during World War Two, when the Province of Ljubljana was part of Italy. After the war, he briefly worked as a manual worker. In 1950, he was drafted into the Yugoslav People's Army, and he served in Požarevac, Serbia. Because of his non-comformist attitudes, he was accused of "hostile propaganda" against the Communist regime and was sentenced to three and a half years in prison. He was released in 1955 and returned to Slovenia.

He settled in Maribor, where he started a career as a journalist. In the early 1950s, he moved back to Ljubljana, where he took up a career as a freelance writer and columnist. He became involved in a circle of young intellectuals known as the Critical Generation. He also became a close friend of the Christian Socialist poet Edvard Kocbek and the existentialist playwright Dominik Smole. Later, he grew closer to Christian ideals, especially through the influence of Christian existentialist thinkers such as Søren Kierkegaard and Miguel de Unamuno.

He became a co-editor of the alternative independent literary journal Perspektive and later also the director of the experimental theatre called Stage 57 (Oder 57). In 1964, the theatre tried to stage one of Rožanc's critical plays, Topla greda (The Greenhouse), but the Communist regime violently interrupted the staging. Rožanc established connections with Slovene Roman Catholic intellectuals from Trieste (Italy), critical towards the Yugoslav Communist system, and published several articles in the journal Most, edited by Boris Pahor and Alojz Rebula. He was sentenced to two and a half years, but released on parole. In the 1970s, he worked as a sports manager in Ljubljana. In 1979, he published his best-known novel, Ljubezen (Love), an autobiographical account of the everyday life of a child in Ljubljana during World War Two. In the same year, he settled in the Karst region in the Slovenian Littoral, and continued to publish essays and short stories in various Slovenian journals. In 1987, he was among the authors of the Contributions to the Slovenian National Program.

In 1990, he actively supported the candidature of Jože Pučnik as President of Slovenia, but he never joined any political party or organization.

He died in Ljubljana.

In 1993, the Rožanc Award for the best essay in Slovene was named after him.
