= Spodnja Zadobrova =

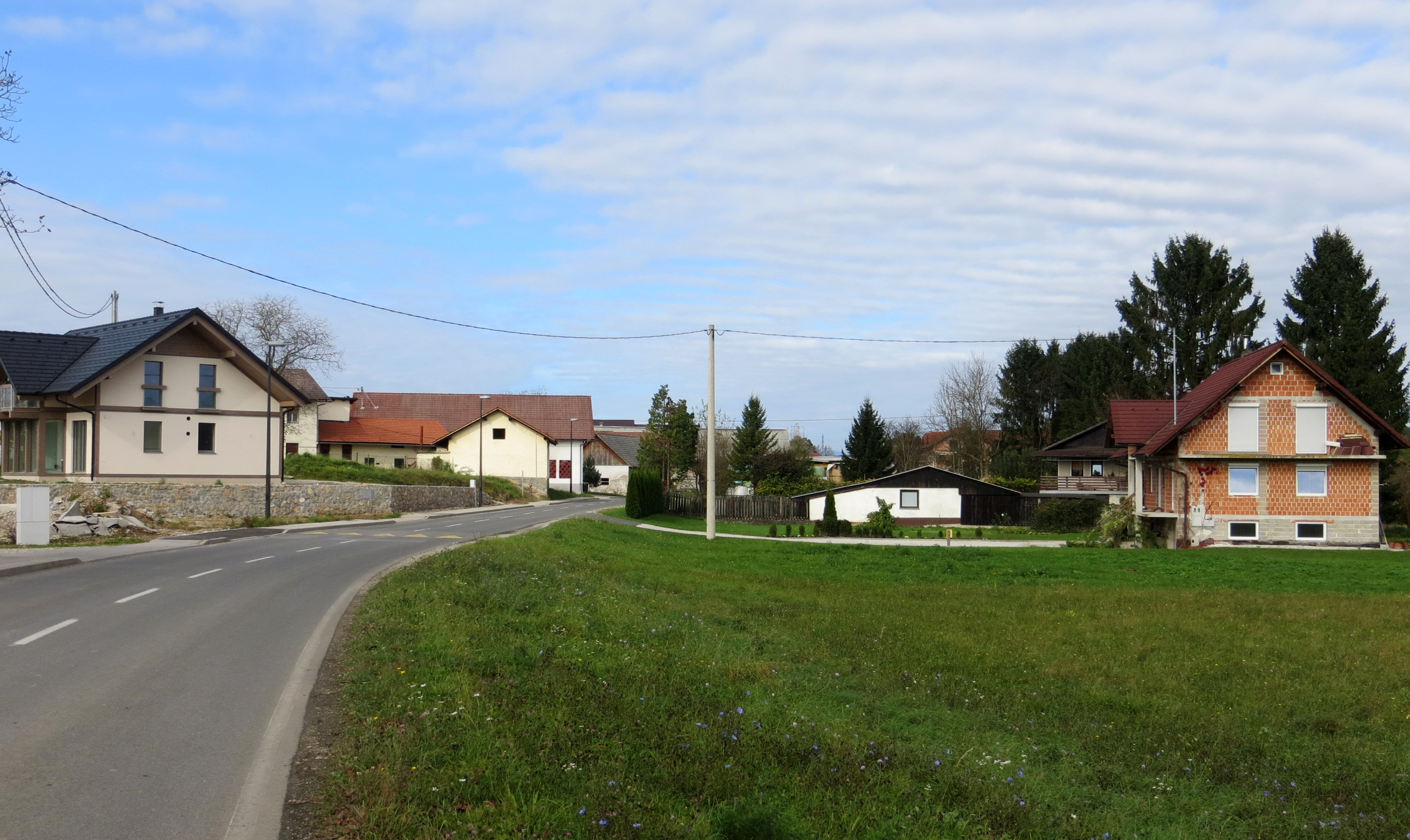

- Location in Slovenia
- Coordinates: 46°4′7.98″N 14°35′44.49″E
- Country: Slovenia
- Traditional region: Upper Carniola
- Statistical region: Central Slovenia
- Municipality: Ljubljana
- Elevation: 280 m (920 ft)

Spodnja Zadobrova (pronounced [ˈspoːdnja zaˈdoːbɾɔʋa]; in older sources also Dolenja Zadobrova, German: Untersadobrawa) is a formerly independent settlement in the eastern part of the capital Ljubljana in central Slovenia. It is part of the traditional region of Upper Carniola and is now included with the rest of the municipality in the Central Slovenia Statistical Region.

== Geography ==
Spodnja Zadobrova is a compact village northwest of Zalog at the transition between higher gravelly land with fields and lower-lying meadows extending north to the Sava River. The soil is mostly sandy. Houses extend along the road from Zalog to Sneberje.

== Name ==
The name Spodnja Zadobrova literally means 'lower Zadobrova', distinguishing the settlement from neighboring Zgornja Zadobrova (literally, 'upper Zadobrova'). The name Zadobrova is a fused prepositional phrase that has lost its case ending, from za 'behind' + dobrova (< Common Slavic *dǫbrova) 'place where there is a deciduous or oak forest', in turn derived from *dǫbъ 'deciduous tree, oak'. Like similar names (e.g., Dobrova, Dobrovce, Dobrovnik), it originally referred to the local vegetation. In the past the German name was Untersadobrawa.

== History ==
Spodnja Zadobrova was annexed by the City of Ljubljana in 1982, ending its existence as an independent settlement.

== Notable people ==
Notable people that were born or lived in Spodnja Zadobrova include:

- Pepca Kardelj, née Maček (1914–1990), communist politician and wife of Edvard Kardelj
- Ivan Maček (1908–1993), communist politician and People's Hero of Yugoslavia
- Milan Zabukovec (1923–1997), Partisan and People's Hero of Yugoslavia
