= Zadobrova, Ljubljana =

Coordinates: 46°04′15″N 14°35′03″E

Zadobrova is a part of Ljubljana, the capital of Slovenia. It is a suburb that used to be two separate villages: Spodnja Zadobrova and Zgornja Zadobrova. It is part of the Polje District.

== Public transport ==
- Zadobrova is served by LPP bus lines 12 and 25.
- The nearest railway station is Ljubljana Polje, 2 km away.

== Infrastructure ==
The A1 Motorway passes by Zadobrova. There is a motorway exit and a junction with the H3 Expressway. Both the A1 and H3 form the Ljubljana bypass.
