= Order of the Hero of Socialist Labour =

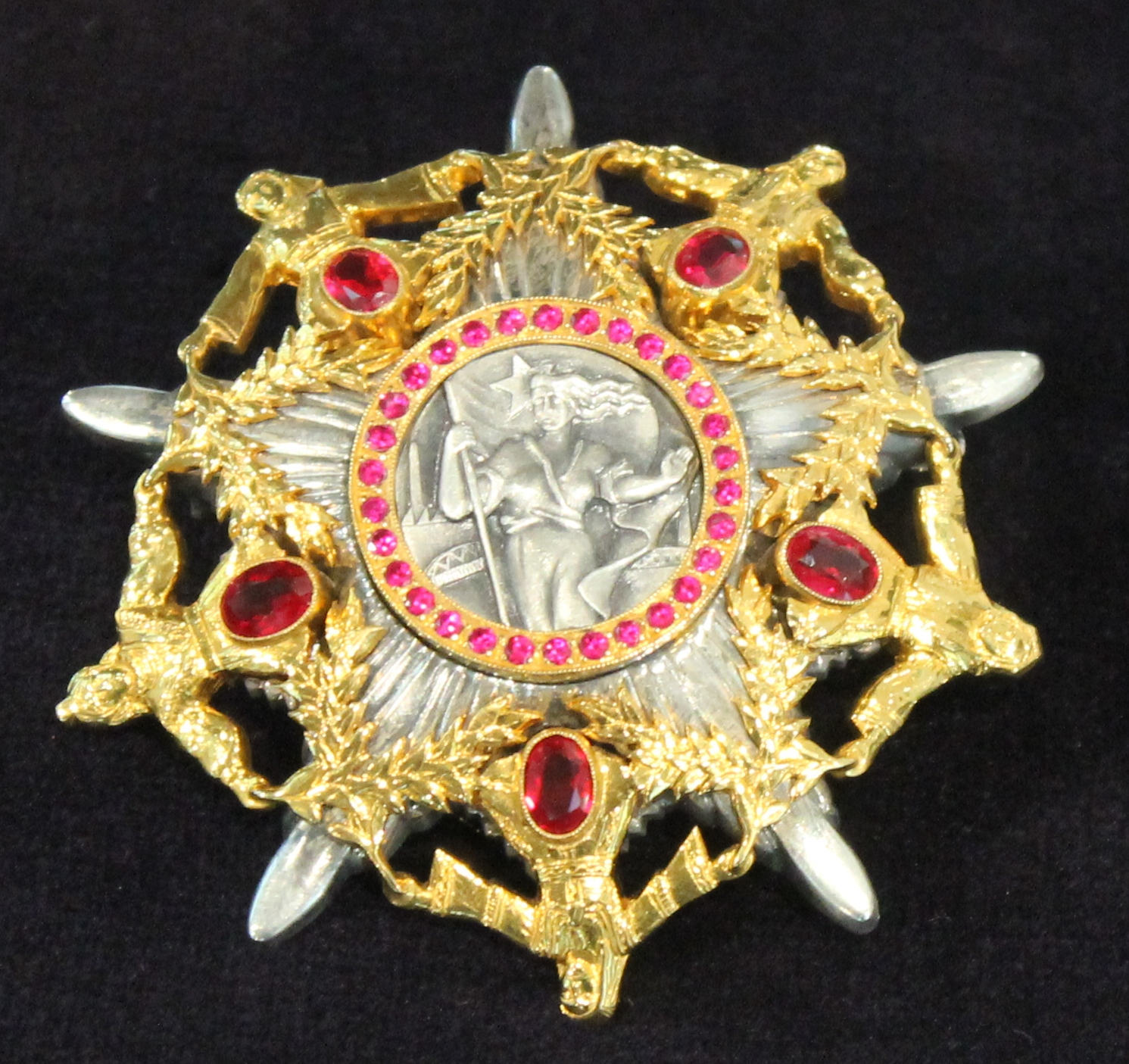
- Order of the Hero of Socialist labour badge
- Type: Order of merit with one degree
- Awarded for: Outstanding achievements in national economy and culture
- Country: Yugoslavia
- Eligibility: Yugoslav citizens
- Status: Dissolved
- Established: 8 December 1948
- First award: 1949
- Final award: 1987

Highlights
- Total recipients: 128
- Ribbon of the order

Precedence
- Next (higher): Order of the People's Hero
- Next (lower): Order of the People's Liberation

Order of the Hero of Socialist Labour (Serbo-Croatian: Orden junaka socijalističkog rada / Орден јунака социјалистичког рада, Slovene: Red junaka socialističnega dela, Macedonian: Орден на јунак на социјалистичката работа) was the fourth highest state decoration awarded in Yugoslavia. It was awarded to Yugoslav citizens, companies and sports teams for outstanding achievements in their professional work. The order was awarded a total of 121 times until 1987. After the Breakup of Yugoslavia the decoration was discontinued.

Along with the order, the recipient was awarded the title of Hero of Socialist Labour (Serbo-Croatian: Junak socijalističkog rada / Јунак социјалистичког рада, Slovene: Junak socialističnega dela, Macedonian: Jунак на социјалистичката работа).

== History ==
The Order of the Hero of Socialist Labour was formally established on 8 December 1948 as the Yugoslav equivalent to the Soviet title of Hero of Socialist Labour. The order was officially bestowed by the President of Yugoslavia.

First recipient of the order was Moša Pijade, in 1949. Only two people were awarded the order twice - Edvard Kardelj (in 1955 and posthumously in 1979) and Đuro Pucar (in 1959 and posthumously in 1979). Five women received the award - Spasenija Cana Babović, Anka Berus, Lidija Šentjurc, Vida Tomšič and Ida Sabo. The only foreigner who received the award was President of Romania and General Secretary of the Romanian Communist Party, Nicolae Ceaușescu, who received the award in January 1978.

The Law on decorations was amended in 1976 when the criteria for awarding the Order of the Hero of Socialist Labour was precised as "For many years of recognized work and outstanding services in the development of Yugoslavia and the building of a socialist self-governing society".

== Recipients ==
As of 31 December 1968, the Order of People's Liberation was awarded 36 times. The Order was awarded a total of 121 times until 1987. Some of the notable recipients are:

- Moša Pijade - awarded on 31 December 1949
- Josip Broz Tito - awarded on 27 April 1950
- Boris Kidrič - awarded in April 1950
- People's Youth of Yugoslavia - awarded on 6 March 1953
- Miroslav Krleža - awarded on 2 March 1953
- Aleksandar Ranković - awarded in May 1954
- Đuro Salaj - awarded on 16 May 1956
- Pavle Gregorić - awarded in October 1957
- Franc Leskošek - awardedon 8 December 1957
- Đuro Pucar - awarded on 12 December 1959 and again on 14 April 1979 (posthumously)
- Rodoljub Čolaković- awarded on 7 June 1960
- Miha Marinko - awarded on 7 September 1960
- Josip Vidmar - awarded on 15 October 1960
- Ivan Ribar - awarded on 24 January 1961
- In April 1961, the Order of the Hero of Socialist Labour was bestowed upon, among others:
  - Vladimir Bakarić
  - Ivan Gošnjak
  - Blažo Jovanović
  - Lazar Koliševski
  - Petar Stambolić
  - Jovan Veselinov
  - Veljko Vlahović
  - Svetozar Vukmanović
- On 3 July 1963, the Order of the Hero of Socialist Labour was bestowed upon:
  - Spasenija Babović
  - Anka Berus
- Koča Popović - awarded in March 1968
- Krste Crvenkovski - awarded on 31 July 1969
- Ljupčo Arsov - awarded on 19 May 1970
- Milentije Popović - awarded on 10 May 1971 (posthumously)
- Kosta Nađ - awarded on 14 June 1971
- Jakov Blažević - awarded on 24 March 1972
- Vicko Krstulović - awarded on 29 July 1972
- Ivo Andrić - awarded on 10 October 1972
- Đoko Pajković - awarded on 9 December 1972
- Cvijetin Mijatović - awarded on 7 January 1973
- Vida Tomšič - awarded on 10 July 1973
- City of Skopje - awarded on 24 July 1973
- Dušan Petrović Šane - awarded on 24 June 1974
- Vlado Janić - awarded on 23 September 1974
- Ratomir Dugonjić - awarded on 8 January 1976
- Fadil Hoxha - awarded on 15 March 1976
- Nikola Ljubičić - awarded on 6 April 1976
- Mika Špiljak - awarded on 8 December 1976
- Džemal Bijedić - awarded on 19 January 1977 (posthumously)
- Rudi Kolak - awarded on 31 March 1978
- Nicolae Ceaușescu - awarded on 16 November 1978
- Dobrivoje Vidić - awarded on 8 January 1979
- Pavle Savić - awarded on 12 January 1979
- Oskar Davičo - awarded on 19 January 1979
- Edvard Kardelj - awarded on 10 February 1979 (second time, posthumously)
- Stane Dolanc - awarded on 16 May 1979
- Miloš Minić - awarded on 21 May 1979
- Moma Marković - awarded on 21 May 1979
- Mitja Ribičič- awarded on 24 May 1979
- Mihailo Lalić - awarded on 26 June 1979
- Stevan Doronjski - awarded on 25 September 1979
- Borko Temelkovski - awarded on 19 December 1979
- Dragoslav Marković - awarded on 27 June 1980
- Franjo Herljević - awarded on 22 July 1980
- Peko Dapčević - awarded on 22 June 1981
- Veljko Milatović - awarded on 4 December 1981
- Radovan Vlajković - awarded on 18 November 1982
- On16 January 1984, the Order of the Hero of Socialist Labour was bestowed upon:
  - Hamdija Pozderac
  - Dragutin Kosovac
- Viktor Avbelj - awarded on 7 May 1984
- Emerik Blum - awarded on 31 July 1984 (posthumously)
- Veselin Đuranović - awarded on 22 July 1985
- Ali Šukrija - awarded on 25 October 1985
- Branko Mamula - awarded on 22 December 1985
- Branko Pešić - awarded on 26 January 1986
- Ida Sabo - awarded on 23 May 1986
- Vlado Šegrt - awarded on 21 November 1986
- Vidoje Žarković - awarded on 6 July 1987

== See also ==
- Orders, decorations, and medals of the Socialist Federal Republic of Yugoslavia
- Orders, decorations, and medals of the Federal Republic of Yugoslavia
