= Ivan Maček =

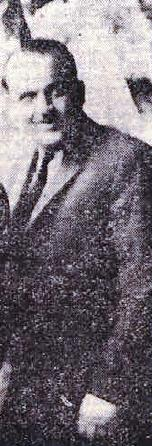

5th President of the People's Assembly of SR Slovenia
- In office 1963–1967
- Prime Minister: Viktor Avbelj; Janko Smole; Stane Kavčić
- Preceded by: Miha Marinko
- Succeeded by: Sergej Kraigher

Personal details
- Born: 28 May 1908 Spodnja Zadobrova, near Laibach, Austria-Hungary
- Died: 10 July 1993 (aged 85) Ljubljana, Slovenia
- Party: League of Communists of Yugoslavia (SKJ)

Ivan Maček, nom de guerre Matija (28 May 1908 – 10 July 1993), was a Yugoslav Communist politician from Slovenia who served as the President of the People's Assembly of SR Slovenia from 1963 to 1967.

== Biography ==
Maček was born in Spodnja Zadobrova near Ljubljana, Austria-Hungary (now in Slovenia). He became a member of the Communist Party of Yugoslavia in 1930, and in 1935 was sent to the Soviet Union where he studied at the International Lenin School, Moscow. He returned to Yugoslavia in 1937 and became a member of the Central committee of the newly found Communist party of Slovenia. Yugoslav police detained him in 1938 and he was sentenced to four years in prison in Sremska Mitrovica.

After the invasion of Yugoslavia in 1941, he and a group of 32 other communist political prisoners escaped from the prison and joined the Yugoslav partisan resistance. In 1942 he was sent to occupied Slovenia to be one of commanders of the Slovene partisan resistance. There he was appointed commander of the Main Headquarters of the Partisan Units of Slovenia and political commissar of the Main headquarters during 1942. Maček was appointed the rank of general-major and became a member of the Liberation Front of the Slovene Nation in 1944.

After the war, Maček moved into a mansion that had been confiscated from the pharmacist Leo Bahovec. Maček was minister of the interior and vice-president of the Slovene government (1945–1953), vice-president of the Executive council of PR Slovenia and a member of the Federal Executive Council (1953–1963) and also the President of the People's Assembly of SR Slovenia (1963–1967). He was also a deputy in the National and Federal Assembly.

He died in Ljubljana, Slovenia on 10 July 1993 due to heart failure.

Maček was declared a People's Hero of Yugoslavia in 1952.

=== Controversy ===
According to historian Jože Dežman, chairman of the Commission on Concealed Mass Graves in Slovenia, Ivan Maček is among the most responsible for the post-war extrajudicial killings of the captured nazis and their collaborators in Slovenia.

== Family ==
His cousin was Pepca Kardelj, spouse of the prominent Slovene politician Edvard Kardelj.

Political offices
Preceded by Miha Marinko	President of the People's Assembly of SR Slovenia; 1963 – 1967	Succeeded by Sergej Kraigher
