= Zgornja Zadobrova =

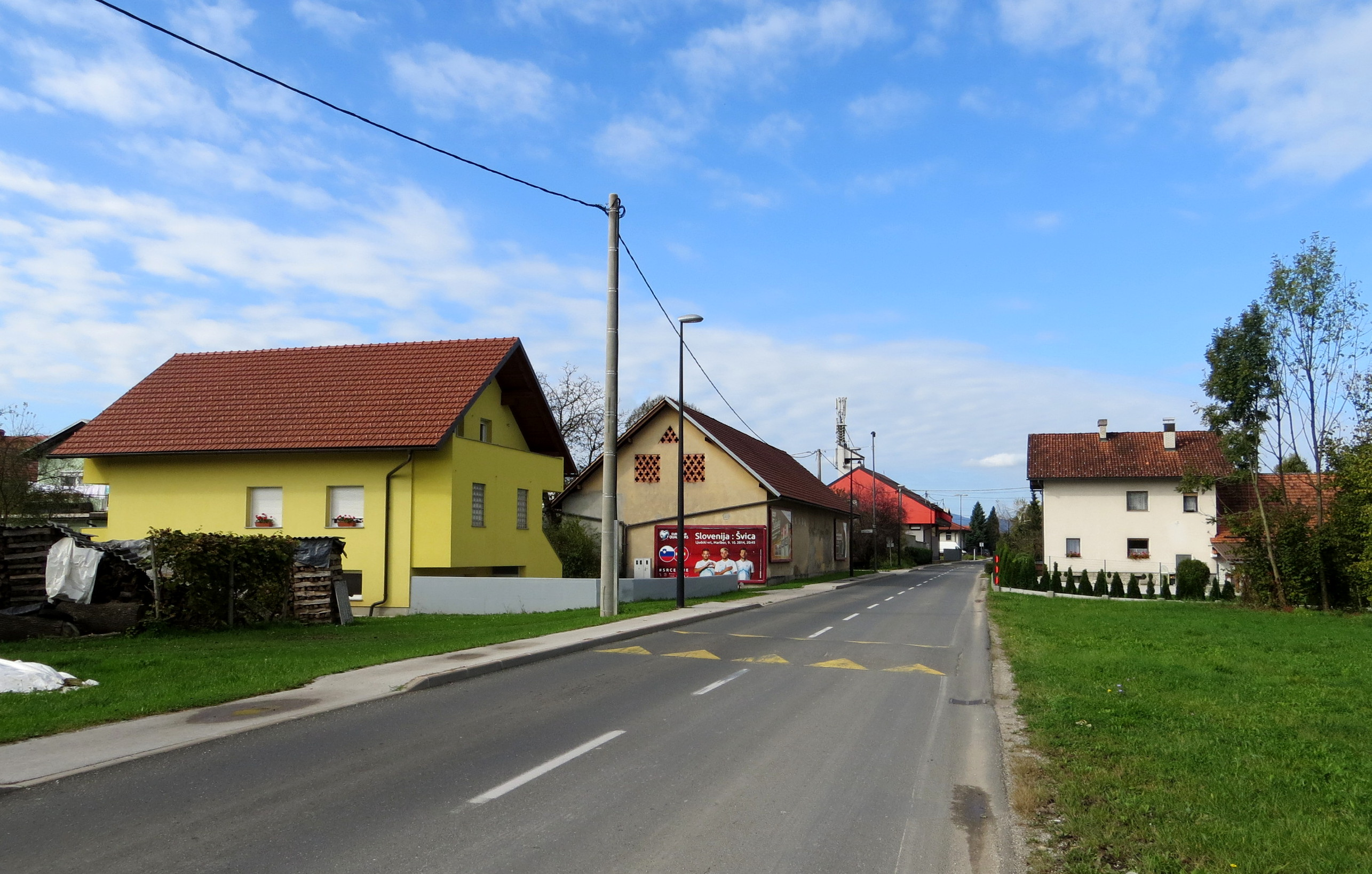

- Location in Slovenia
- Coordinates: 46°4′10.09″N 14°34′58.31″E
- Country: Slovenia
- Traditional region: Upper Carniola
- Statistical region: Central Slovenia
- Municipality: Ljubljana
- Elevation: 282 m (925 ft)

Zgornja Zadobrova (pronounced [ˈzɡoːɾnja zaˈdoːbɾɔʋa]; in older sources also Gorenja Zadobrova, German: Obersadobrawa) is a formerly independent settlement in the eastern part of the capital Ljubljana in central Slovenia. It is part of the traditional region of Upper Carniola and is now included with the rest of the municipality in the Central Slovenia Statistical Region.

== Geography ==
Zgornja Zadobrova is an elongated village west of Spodnja Zadobrova, extending between the low-lying meadows along the Sava River and the former river banks along the road from Zalog to Sneberje. The soil is mostly sandy.

== Name ==
The name Zgornja Zadobrova literally means 'upper Zadobrova', distinguishing the settlement from neighboring Spodnja Zadobrova (literally, 'lower Zadobrova'). The name Zadobrova is a fused prepositional phrase that has lost its case ending, from za 'behind' + dobrova (< Common Slavic *dǫbrova) 'place where there is a deciduous or oak forest', in turn derived from *dǫbъ 'deciduous tree, oak'. Like similar names (e.g., Dobrova, Dobrovce, Dobrovnik), it originally referred to the local vegetation. In the past the German name was Obersadobrawa.

== History ==
Evidence of early settlement of the area has been found at the Zgornja Zadobrova archaeological site. Finds include stone items from prehistoric settlement and a sestertius issued during the reign of Trajan. The Ljuk Mill (Slovene: Ljukov Mlin) formerly stood along a small creek northeast of the village. A school was established in Zgornja Zadobrova in 1951. Lessons took place in a private residence until 1958, when a schoolhouse was built as part of the community center. The community center also includes the agricultural cooperative office, a bar, a shop, a movie theater, and public hall. Zgornja Zadobrova was annexed by the City of Ljubljana in 1982, ending its existence as an independent settlement.

== Church ==
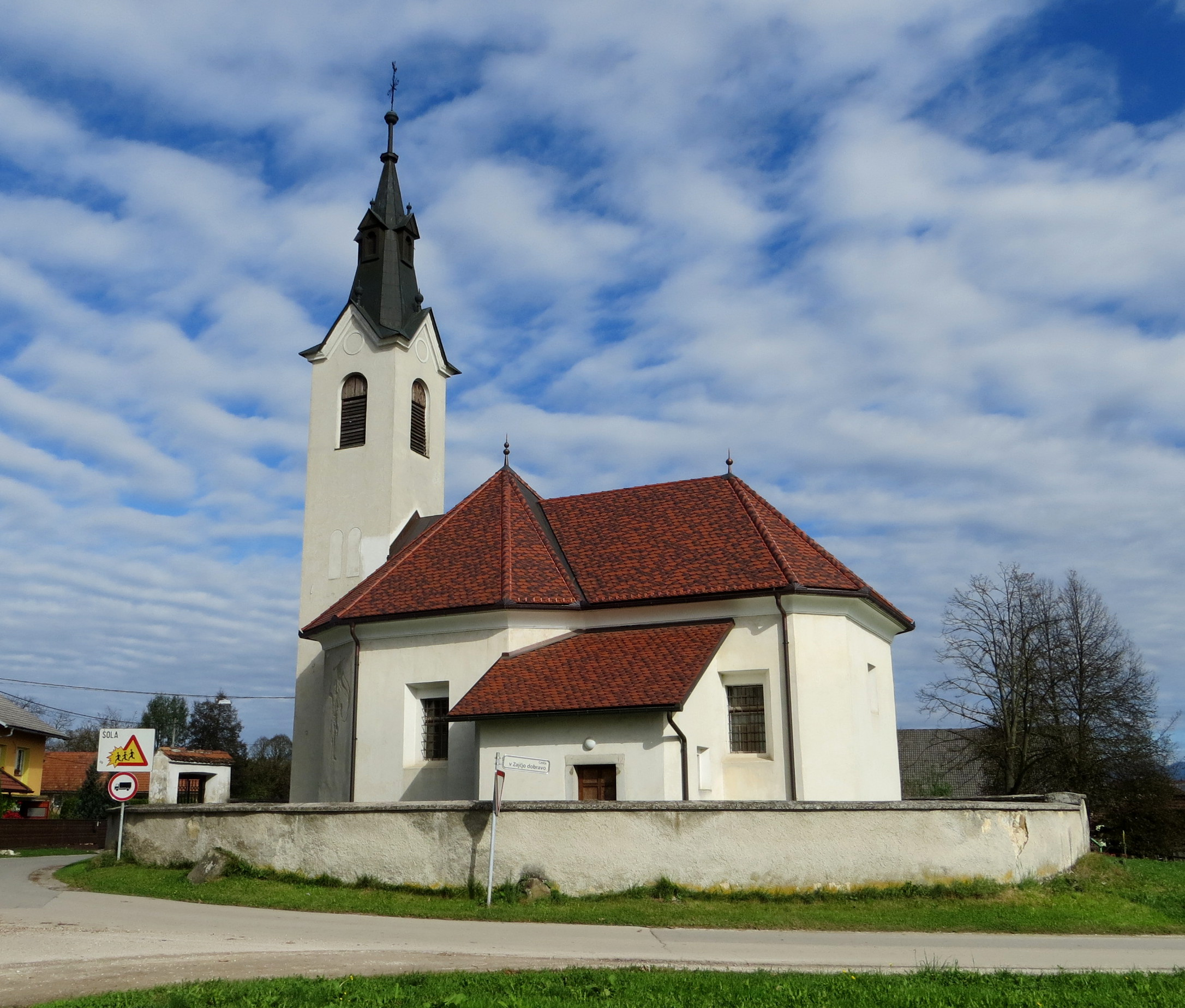
Saint Thomas' Church

The church in Zgornja Zadobrova is dedicated to Saint Thomas (Slovene: sveti Tomaž). It was mentioned in written sources in 1520 and was originally wooden. It burned and was replaced by the current built church in 1529, consecrated by Bishop Thomas Chrön in 1603.
