= Vevče =

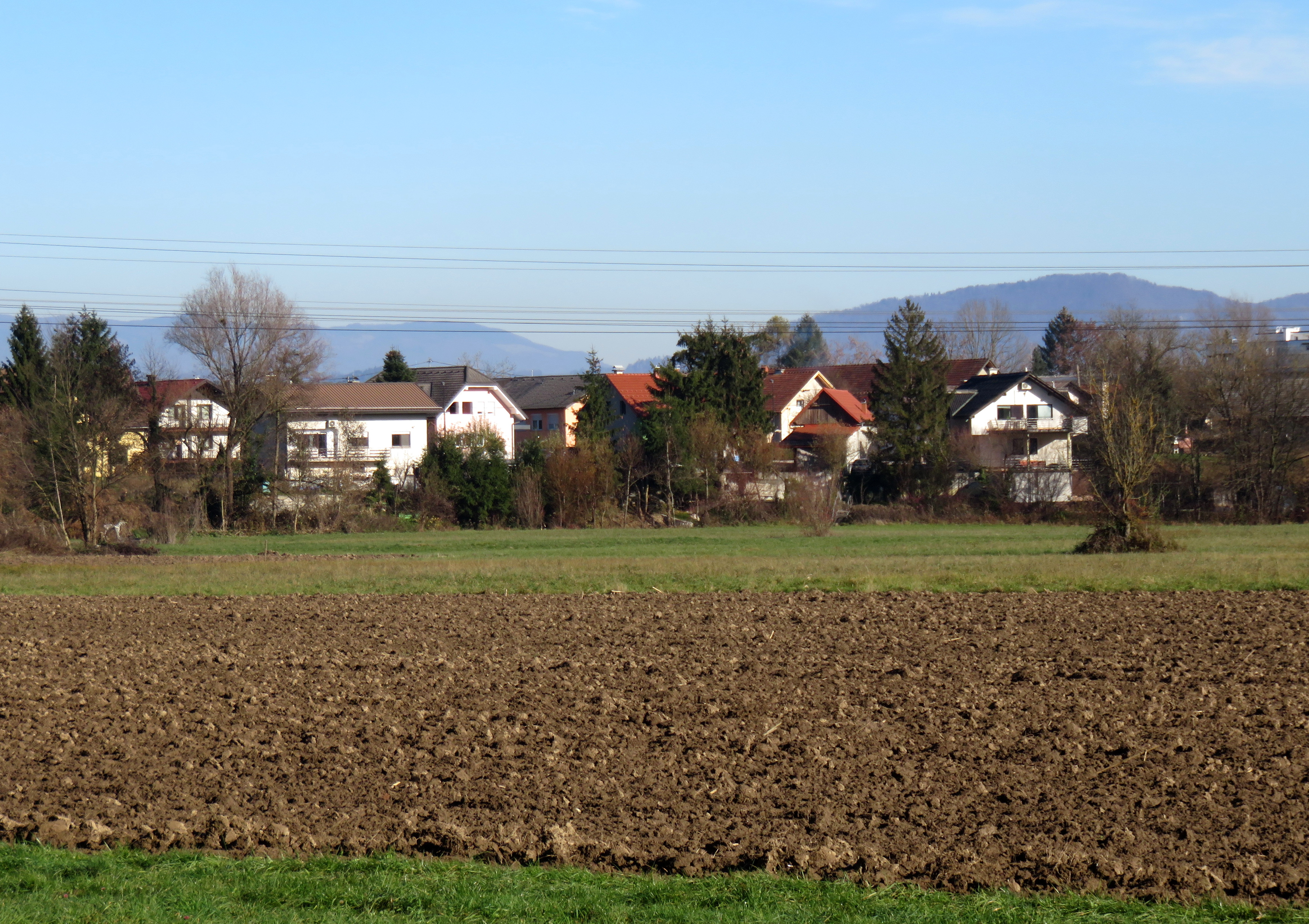

- Location in Slovenia
- Coordinates: 46°2′54.43″N 14°35′9.56″E
- Country: Slovenia
- Traditional region: Upper Carniola
- Statistical region: Central Slovenia
- Municipality: Ljubljana
- Elevation: 275 m (902 ft)

Vevče (pronounced [ˈʋeːu̯tʃɛ]; in older sources also Velče) is a formerly independent settlement in the eastern part of the capital Ljubljana in central Slovenia. It is part of the traditional region of Upper Carniola and is now included with the rest of the municipality in the Central Slovenia Statistical Region.

== Geography ==
Vevče is a dense industrialized settlement south of Polje on both sides of the Ljubljanica River, but mostly on the left bank. It is connected by roads to Polje and Zgornji Kašelj, and by a bridge to Zadvor. To the west, near Slape, there is a large spring that once served as a swimming area. There are still fields northwest of the settlement, where the soil is sandy, and on the right bank of the Ljubljanica, where the soil is loamy.

== Name ==
Vevče was attested in written sources in 1763–67 as Beaucz. It may be of the same origin as the place name Bevče in Styria. If so, it is derived from the plural demonym *Velčane, based on the hypocorism *Velьcь or a similar form.

== History ==
The paper factory in Vevče, which stands on both side of the Ljubljanica, was founded by the Slovene industrialist and politician Fidelis Terpinc (1799–1875). He purchased a grain mill on the Ljubljanica in 1820 and converted it into an oil mill. In 1840, Terpinc founded a society of Ljubljana industrialists to create the paper factory, and the first paper was produced in 1843. The part of the paper factory and the associated neighborhood on the right bank of the river were named Josefsthal; Terpinc named the neighborhood after his wife Josefina. The facility was expanded with property purchased on the left bank of the river in 1850. Terpinc named the factory neighborhood on the left bank Janezia in honor of Archduke John. The rags used as raw material for the paper were warehoused at Fužine Castle (German: Kaltenbrunn) until the 1895 Ljubljana earthquake, when the warehouse was also transferred to Vevče. During the Second World War, the Partisans burned the paper warehouse on 30 August 1942 and the wood warehouse on 31 August 1942. The factory was seized by the communist government and nationalized in 1945. After the Second World War, there was extensive construction in Vevče, including apartment buildings on the north side of the settlement, resulting in the formation of an area known as Na griču (literally, 'On the Hill'). Vevče was annexed by the City of Ljubljana in 1982, ending its existence as an independent settlement.

== Notable people ==
Notable people that were born or lived in Vevče include:

- Stane Bobnar (1912–1996), communist, Partisan, and People's Hero of Yugoslavia
- Josip Križaj (1877–1968), opera and concert singer
- Janez Kuhar (1911–1997), musician and composer
- Angela Ocepek (1912–1968), politician
