= Spodnji Kašelj =

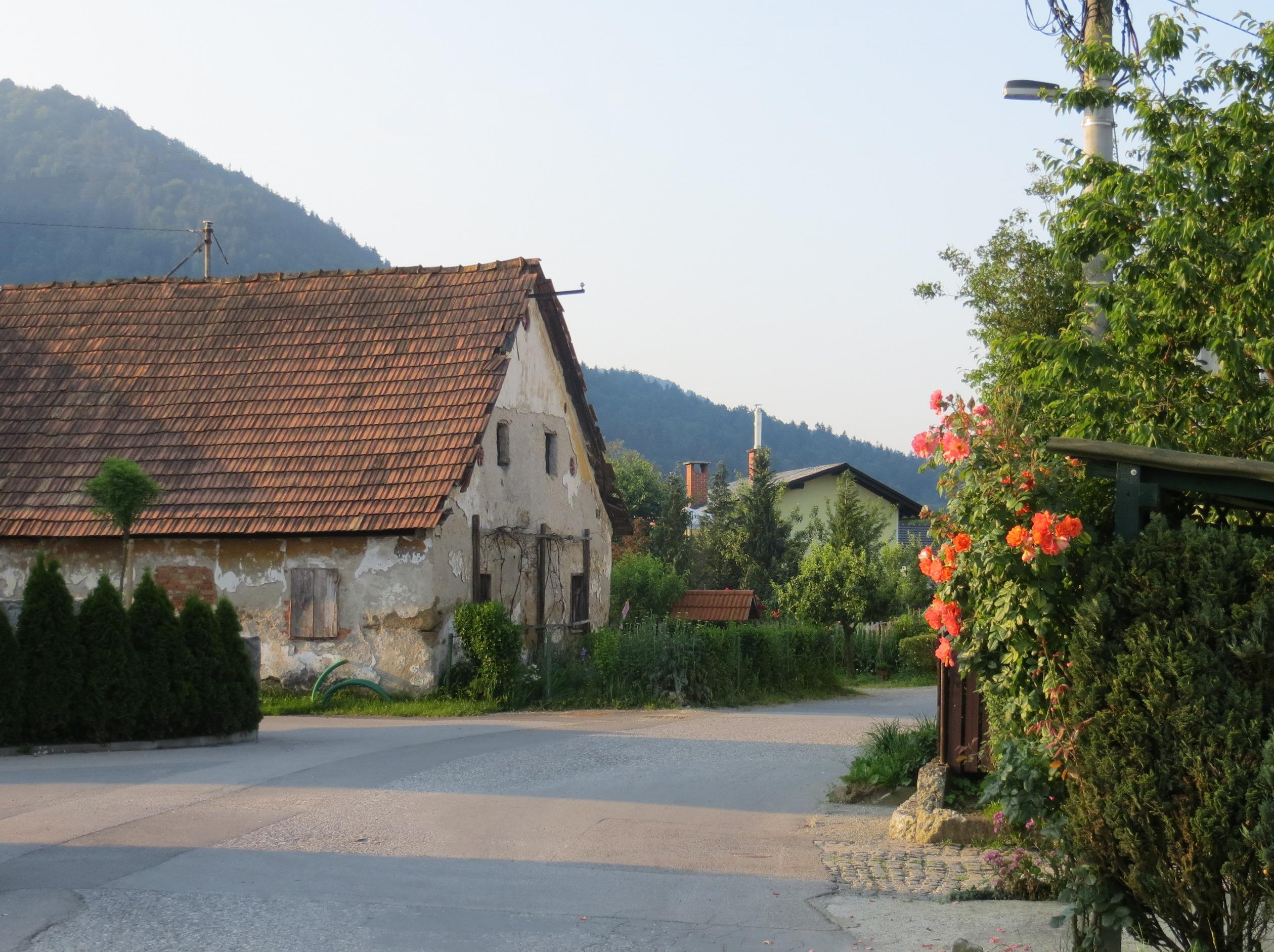

- Location in Slovenia
- Coordinates: 46°3′30.24″N 14°37′5.88″E
- Country: Slovenia
- Traditional region: Upper Carniola
- Statistical region: Central Slovenia
- Municipality: Ljubljana
- Elevation: 275 m (902 ft)

Spodnji Kašelj (pronounced [ˈspoːdnji ˈkaːʃəl]; in older sources also Dolenji Kašelj, German: Unterkaschel) is a formerly independent settlement in the eastern part of the capital Ljubljana in central Slovenia. It is a compact settlement above the left bank of the Ljubljanica River between Zgornji Kašelj and Zalog. It is part of the traditional region of Upper Carniola and is now included with the rest of the municipality in the Central Slovenia Statistical Region.

== Geography ==
Kašelj Hill (Slovene: Kašeljski grič) rises east of the settlement, across the Ljubljanica River. Below the hill to the north, Spodnji Kašel extends to Cold Valley (Mrzla dolina), so called because the winter snow lies there late into the spring. The soil in Spodnji Kašel is sandy and there are fields to the west.

== Name ==
Spodnji Kašelj was mentioned in written sources together with neighboring Zgornji Kašelj in 1360 as Niederchaeschel and Kaeschel (and as Geschel in 1421, (Ober) Kassel in 1436, and Kaschell in 1496). The name is derived from German Kassel and it is likely that the German name is derived from Latin castellum 'castle', referring to one or both castles on Kašelj Hill east of the settlement. However, it is also possible that the name is derived from Latin casale 'peasant house, peasant settlement'. In the past the German name was Unterkaschel.

== History ==
On the western slope of Kašelj Hill there is an abandoned quarry. Tradition states that the last French soldier from the short-lived Illyrian Provinces was executed there. In Cold Valley there is a plaque next to an old bunker commemorating four Partisans that were killed by Anti-Communist Volunteer Militia forces on 16 April 1943. Spodnji Kašelj was annexed by the City of Ljubljana in 1982, ending its existence as an independent settlement.
