= Sneberje =

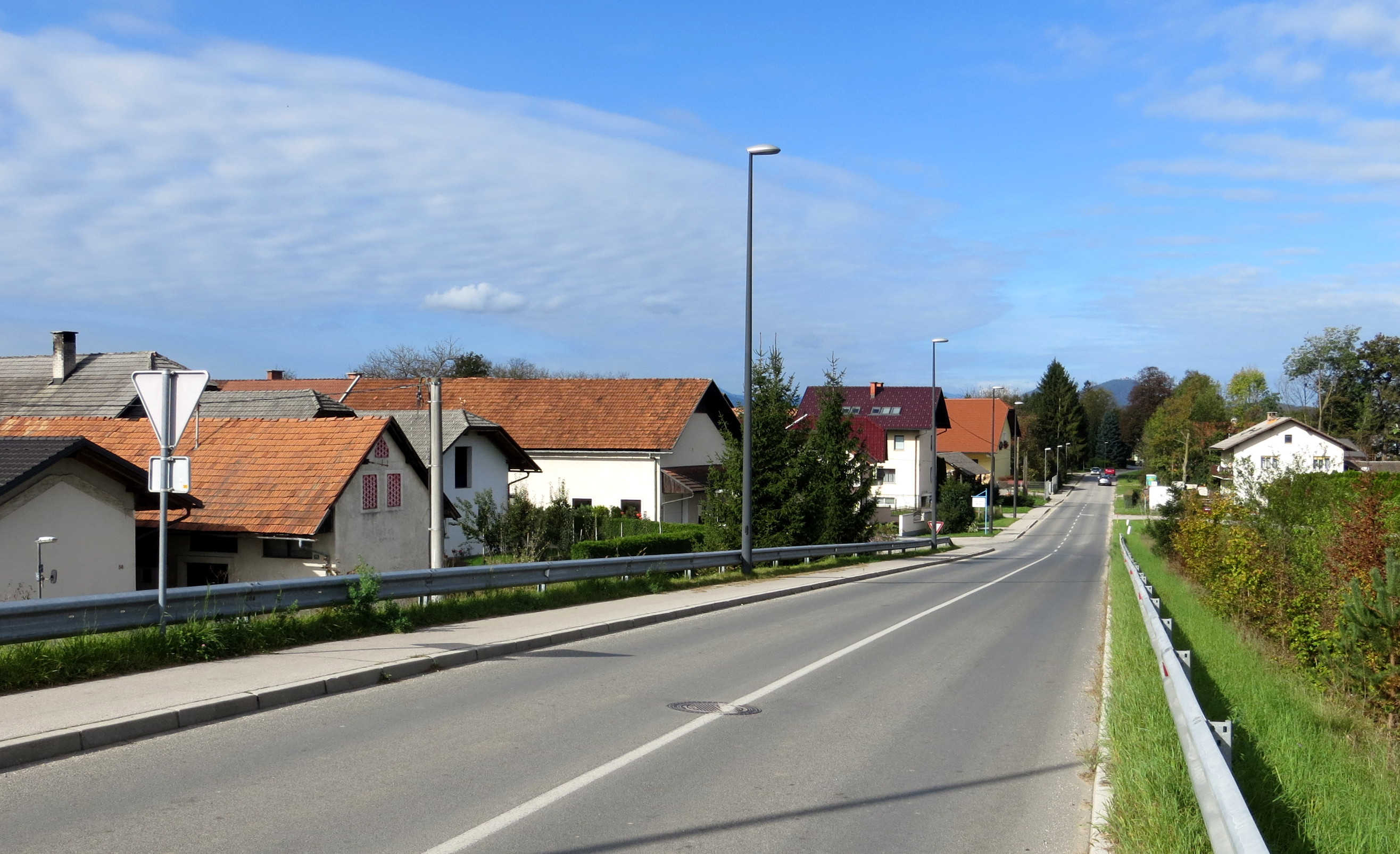

- Location in Slovenia
- Coordinates: 46°4′39.27″N 14°34′31.69″E
- Country: Slovenia
- Traditional region: Upper Carniola
- Statistical region: Central Slovenia
- Municipality: Ljubljana
- Elevation: 278 m (912 ft)

Sneberje (pronounced [ˈsneːbɛɾjɛ]; in older sources also Snebrje) is a formerly independent settlement in the northeast part of the capital Ljubljana in central Slovenia. It is part of the traditional region of Upper Carniola and is now included with the rest of the municipality in the Central Slovenia Statistical Region.

== Geography ==
Sneberje is a linear settlement on a terrace above the Sava River along the road from Zalog. The settlement extends east to the edge of Zgornja Zadobrova and southwest to Hrastje. The soil is gravely, becoming loamy to the north towards the Sava. Fields lie south of the settlement.

== Name ==
Sneberje was attested in written sources in 1359 as Zzomebryach and in 1363 as Sewemriach. The etymology of the name is unclear. Proposed reconstructions from *sěnoberьje and *sěnoberъ 'gathering hay' have been rejected for historical and linguistic reasons. A hypothetical etymology is derivation from *(pri) sin’ejemъ vyrьjě 'at the blue pool', referring to its location near the Sava River.

== History ==
During the Second World War, Slavko Novak was shot by Italian forces on 22 June 1941 at house no. 1 in Sneberje. He is considered the first victim of the Italian forces in Ljubljana, and a plaque on the house commemorates the event. A Partisan checkpoint operated at the Kumše house during the war. Sneberje experienced a large increase in construction after the Second World War. North of the settlement, towards the Sava River, there used to be a racetrack for cars. It was abandoned in 1969 and planted over with poplar trees. Sneberje was annexed by the City of Ljubljana in 1982, ending its existence as an independent settlement.

== Notable people ==
Notable people that were born or lived in Sneberje include:

- Mila Kačič (1912–2000), poet, actress, and singer
