= Ida Sabo =

Yugoslavian communist

- Born: 6 July 1915; Pécs, Austria-Hungary
- Died: 24 November 2016 (aged 101); Novi Sad, Serbia
- Occupation: politician
- Known for: Slovene Partisan
- Political party: League of Communists of Yugoslavia
- Awards: Awards

Ida Sabo (Serbian Cyrillic: Ида Сабо) (Pécs, 6 July 1915 – Novi Sad, 2016) was a Yugoslavian communist. During World War II, she joined the Slovene Partisans and after the war she held several offices in Vojvodina.

== Awards ==
- Order of the Hero of Socialist Labour
- Order of Brotherhood and Unity
- Order "For Merit to the People"
- Order of Bravery
- Commemorative Medal of the Partisans of 1941
