= Slape (Ljubljana) =

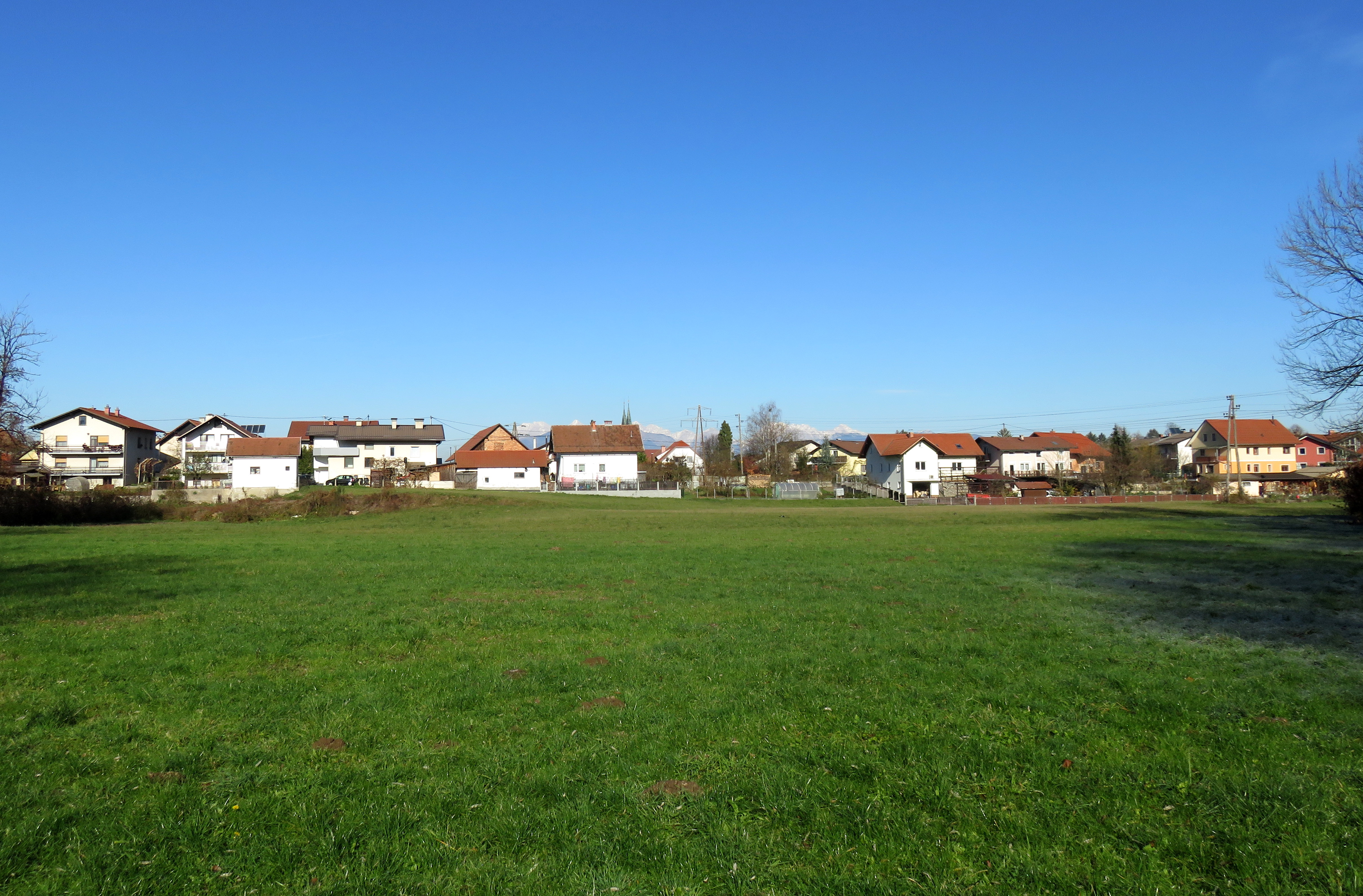

- Location in Slovenia
- Coordinates: 46°3′5.25″N 14°34′42.67″E
- Country: Slovenia
- Traditional region: Upper Carniola
- Statistical region: Central Slovenia
- Municipality: Ljubljana
- Elevation: 280 m (920 ft)

Slape (pronounced [ˈslaːpɛ]) is a formerly independent settlement in the eastern part of the capital Ljubljana in central Slovenia. It is part of the traditional region of Upper Carniola and is now included with the rest of the municipality in the Central Slovenia Statistical Region.

== Geography ==
Slape is a dense settlement just above the left bank of the Ljubljanica River, extending east to Vevče and neighboring on Polje to the north and Studenec to the west. The soil is sandy and shallow, and there is a poplar plantation in the former Sige Meadow along the Ljubljanica. Slape is the site of Old Creek (Slovene: Stara voda), which is fed by a large spring of the same name and empties into the Ljubljanica near the Vevče paper mill.

== Name ==
Slape was attested in written sources in 1330 as Zlapp (and as Slap in 1402 and mul an der Slap in 1465). Now a feminine plural noun, it was originally the accusative plural of the masculine noun slap, in the older sense of 'wave', referring to a place where there were rapids or waves on the river. There were three weirs on the Ljubljanica at Slape that were later removed due to construction of the Vevče paper mill.

== History ==
Polje Airport, created in 1933, was built on land belonging to several landowners from Polje. During the Second World War, Partisan resistance fighters used the Kusold house as a crossing-point over the Ljubljanica. The site is marked by a memorial. After the Second World War, the population of Slape gradually decreased and there was little new construction because people moved away to be closer to their places of work. A fire station was built in Slape after the war. Slape was annexed by the City of Ljubljana in 1982, ending its existence as an independent settlement.

== Church ==
A church dedicated to Saint James formerly stood in Slape. It was demolished in 1789.

== Notable people ==
Notable people that were born or lived in Slape include:

- Franc Rojšek (a.k.a. Jaka, 1914–1975), communist, Partisan, and People's Hero of Yugoslavia
