= Ada Krivic =

Slovene partisan in World War II and politician

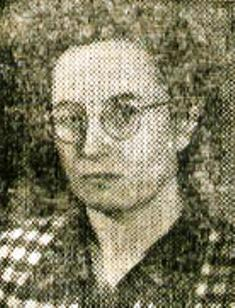
- Born: February 17, 1914; Dvor, Žužemberk
- Died: July 31, 1995 (aged 81); Golnik
- Relatives: Mish Krivic

Ada Krivic (February 17, 1914 – July 31, 1995) was a Slovene partisan in World War II and a noted politician in Yugoslavia. She helped orphans and directed an organisation that assisted children with learning difficulties.

== Life ==
Krivic was born in Dvor, Žužemberk and she graduated from the University of Ljubljana in 1941. She is known for her role as a Yugoslav partisan. She was involved in the early organisation of care for the orphans of parents lost in Ljubljana Between May and June 1942 she was imprisoned by the Italian fascists. She was awarded the Commemorative Medal of the Partisans of 1941.

In the 1950s she was involved with an organisation inspired by Marijan Brelelj. The "Association of Assistance to the Disadvantaged of Slovenia" aimed to assist those with learning difficulties.

Krivic was President of the Association of the Friends of Childhood and a member of the Slovene Executive Conmmittee. She was a high level delegate in 1957 with Vida Tomšič, Lzenda Mimica, Milka Kufrin and Mara Naceva to meet representatives of Eugénie Cotton's Women's International Democratic Federation. The purpose of the meeting was to allow Yugoslavia to join the Women's International Democratic Federation. The WIDF were willing but the Yugoslav's refused the offer but agreed to attend as observers.

Krivic died in Golnik. She was the mother of Mish Krivik who became a leading judge defending equal rights.
