= Josip Križaj (opera singer) =

Slovene opera singer (1887–1968)

Josip Križaj (5 March 1887 in Vevče, Ljubljana – 30 July 1968 in Zagreb) was a Slovene opera singer. He was a bass who started performing at the Zagreb Opera in 1913 and was the recipient of the Vladimir Nazor Award for lifetime achievement in music in 1963.
