= Prevoje pri Šentvidu =

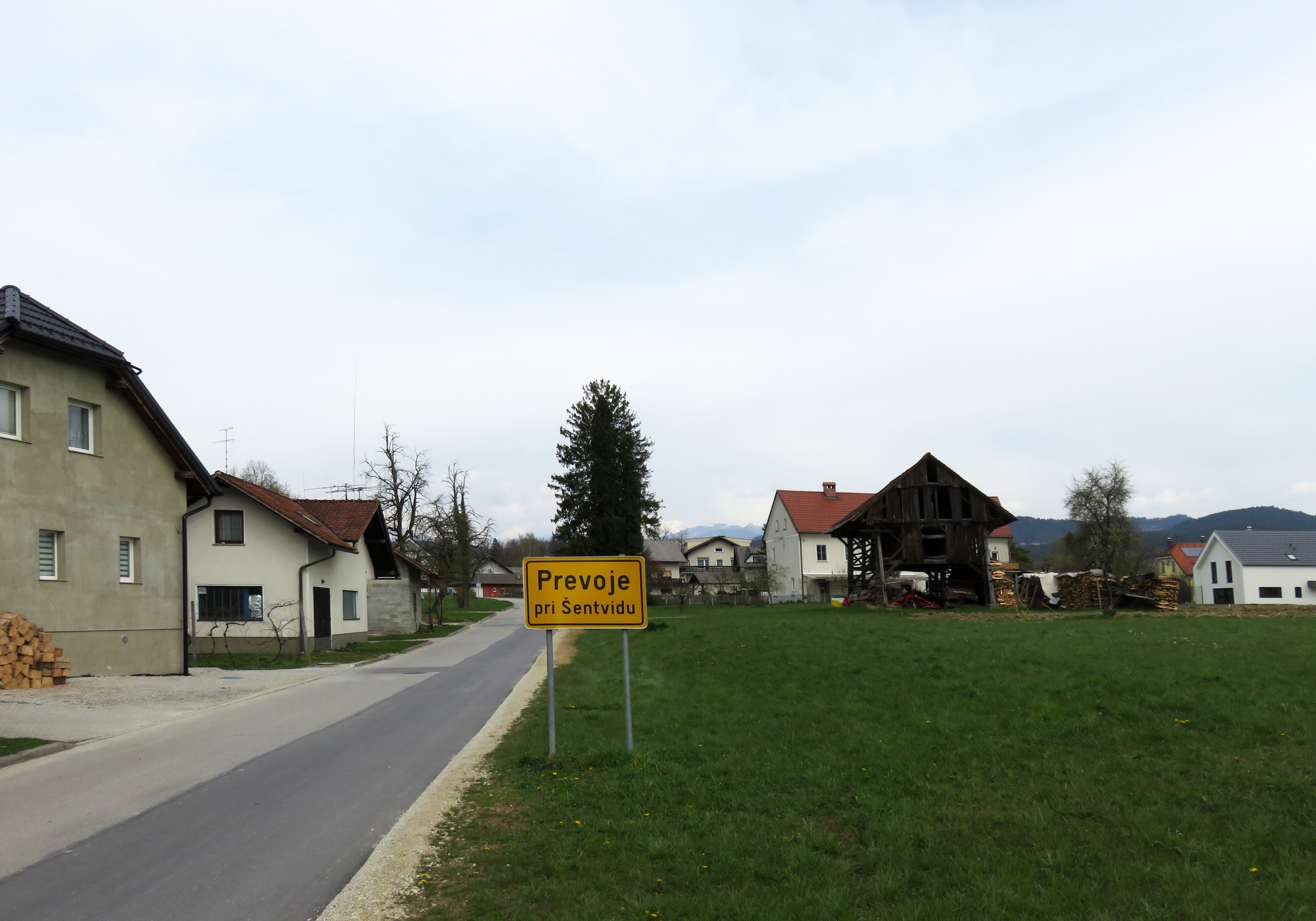

- Location in Slovenia
- Coordinates: 46°9′39.64″N 14°39′43.84″E
- Country: Slovenia
- Traditional region: Upper Carniola
- Statistical region: Central Slovenia
- Municipality: Lukovica

Area
  - Total: 2.36 km^{2} (0.91 sq mi)
- Elevation: 337.2 m (1,106 ft)

Population (2002)
  - Total: 689

Prevoje pri Šentvidu (pronounced [pɾɛˈʋoːjɛ pɾi ʃɛnˈtʋiːdu] or [pɾɛˈʋoːjɛ pɾi ʃənˈtʋiːdu]) is a settlement northeast of Ljubljana on the road to Celje in Slovenia. It is in the Municipality of Lukovica in the eastern part of the Upper Carniola region.

== Name ==
The name of the settlement was changed from Prevoje to Prevoje pri Šentvidu in 1953.

== Notable people ==
Notable people that were born or lived in Prevoje pri Šentvidu include:

- Jakob Zupan (1785–1852), linguist
- Stanko Pelc (born 1957), geographer
- Viktor Avbelj
