= Vida Tomšič =

Slovenian communist politician

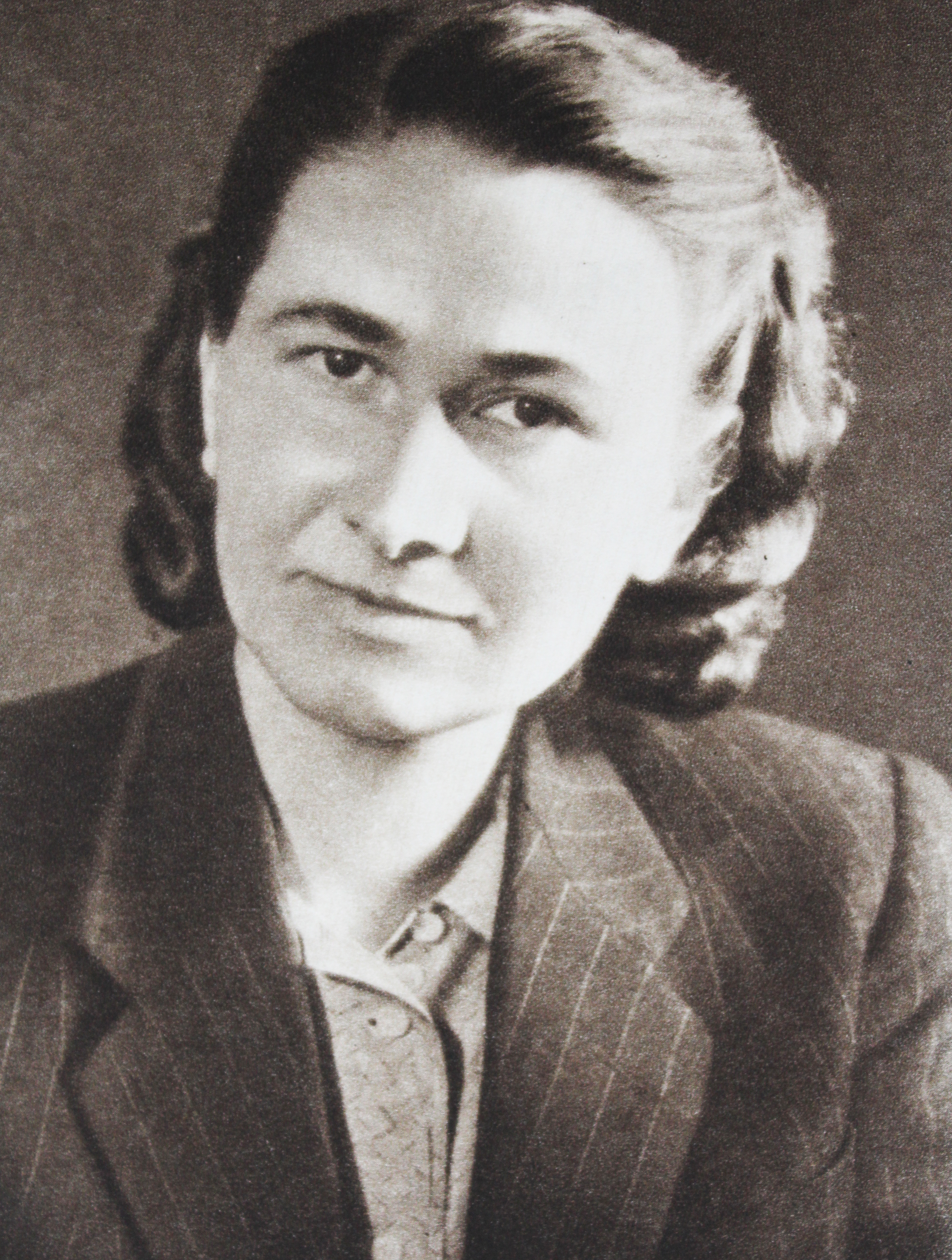

4th President of the People's Assembly of SR Slovenia
- In office 1962–1963
- Prime Minister: Viktor Avbelj
- Preceded by: Miha Marinko
- Succeeded by: Ivan Maček

Personal details
- Born: 26 June 1913 Ljubljana, Austria-Hungary
- Died: 10 December 1998 (aged 85) Ljubljana, Slovenia
- Party: League of Communists

Vida Tomšič née Bernot (26 June 1913 – 10 December 1998) was a Slovenian Partisan fighter during World War II, prominent communist politician, women's activist, and people's hero in postwar Yugoslavia.

Vida Tomšić became an antifascist activist in the interwar period. She was arrested and tortured by the occupation forces during the war, and her husband Tone Tomšić was executed. After the war she acting as a leader of the Women's Antifascist Front of Yugoslavia (AFŽ).

She was born and died in Ljubljana and held many government positions in Slovenia and Yugoslavia during her long career.

Tomšič was a Marxist feminist who "saw women’s rights as strictly dependent on the social and economic development of the country as a whole."

== Life and work ==
Vida Tomšič was born in the family of a schoolteacher living in Ljubljana during the waning years of the Austro-Hungarian Empire, one of five children. She studied law in Ljubljana and graduated in 1941. During her student days, she became involved in the leftist movement, and officially joined the Communist Party of Yugoslavia (CPY) in 1934. For her activities with the CPY, she was arrested in 1934 and spent eleven months in prison. She met her husband, Tone Tomšič, in 1937 who had also been arrested for communist activities. Vida Tomšič was eventually released from prison, and by 1940 she was admitted as a member of the Central Committee of the Communist Party of Yugoslavia.

During the Italian occupation in 1941, Vida Tomšič used the name Mary Singer and gave birth to a son, but by December of that year both Tone and Vida Tomšič were arrested for their illegal political activities in support of the Communist Party. An Italian military tribunal sentenced Tone Tomšič to death, and Vida Tomšič to 25 years in jail. Separated from her son, Vida Tomšič was incarcerated in a string of Italian prisons until the fall of Italy, when she founded one of the first overseas partisan brigades.

Vida Tomšič eventually returned to Yugoslavia and settled in Slovenia, where she was elected to the Slovenian National Liberation Council (SNOS) and threw herself into wartime political activities, particularly among women. In May 1945, she was appointed minister for social policy by the National Government of Slovenia, and she continued to hold important posts in the government of the Socialist Republic of Slovenia until her retirement. She taught as a professor of family law at the Faculty of Law at the University of Ljubljana in the 1970s. She was the first president of the Federal Women’s organization.

== In international relations ==
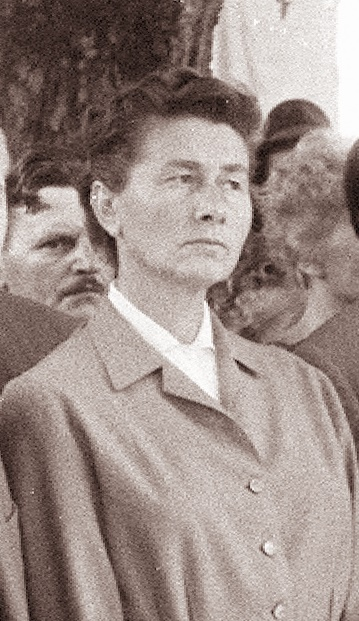
Vida Tomšič 1961

Vida Tomšič often represented Yugoslavia on the international stage, both in bilateral diplomatic relations and within the framework of the Non-Aligned Movement (NAM). She served on multiple Yugoslav delegations to the United Nations. She was a high level delegate in 1957 with Ada Krivic and Mara Naceva to meet representatives of Eugénie Cotton's Women's International Democratic Federation. She served as a member of the Board of the International Research and Training Institute for the Advancement of Women (INSTRAW) in Santo Domingo from 1979 to 1985, and she was the Yugoslav representative to the Social Development Commission of the Economic and Social Council of the United Nations (ECOSOC) in 1960–1963 and 1971–1974, and chaired the commission in 1963.
