= Edvard Kardelj =

Yugoslav politician and economist

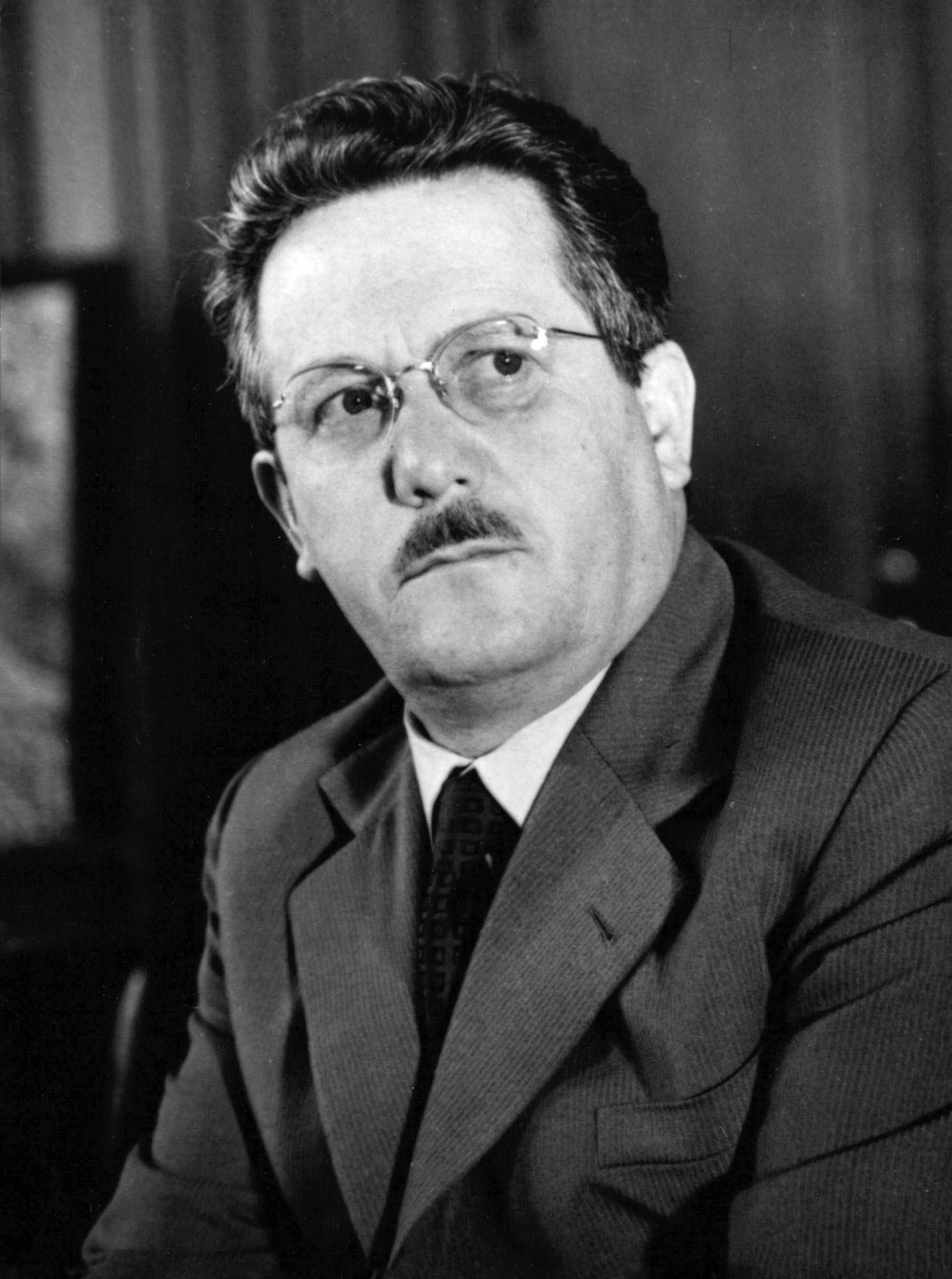
- Kardelj in 1959

Member of the Presidency of Yugoslavia for SR Slovenia
- In office 15 May 1974 – 10 February 1979
- President: Josip Broz Tito
- Preceded by: Marko Bulc; Sergej Kraigher; Mitja Ribičič
- Succeeded by: Sergej Kraigher

7th President of the Federal Assembly of Yugoslavia
- In office 29 June 1963 – 16 May 1967
- Preceded by: Petar Stambolić
- Succeeded by: Milentije Popović

Minister of Foreign Affairs of Yugoslavia
- In office 31 August 1948 – 15 January 1953
- Prime Minister: Josip Broz Tito
- Preceded by: Stanoje Simić
- Succeeded by: Koča Popović

Deputy Prime Minister of Yugoslavia
- In office 2 February 1946 – 29 June 1963
- Prime Minister: Josip Broz Tito
- Preceded by: Position established
- Succeeded by: Boris Kraigher; Miloš Minić; Veljko Zeković

Personal details
- Born: 27 January 1910 Ljubljana, Austria-Hungary
- Died: 10 February 1979 (aged 69) Ljubljana, Slovenia, Yugoslavia
- Cause of death: Colon cancer
- Resting place: Tomb of National Heroes, Ljubljana, Slovenia
- Party: League of Communists of Yugoslavia
- Spouse: Pepca Maček (m. 1939)
- Children: Borut Kardelj
- Relatives: Ivan Maček (brother-in-law)
- Education: Ljubljana Teachers' College; International Lenin School; Communist University of the National Minorities of the West
- Nickname(s): Bevc, Krištof, Sperans

Military service
- Allegiance: Yugoslavia
- Branch/service: Yugoslav Partisans; Yugoslav People's Army
- Years of service: 1941–1979
- Rank: Colonel general
- Battles/wars: World War II in Yugoslavia

Edvard Kardelj (Slovene: [ˈéːdʋaɾt kaɾˈdéːl]; 27 January 1910 – 10 February 1979), also known by the pseudonyms Bevc, Sperans, and Krištof, was a Yugoslav politician and economist. He was one of the leading members of the Communist Party of Slovenia before World War II. During the war, Kardelj was one of the leaders of the Liberation Front of the Slovenian People and a Slovene Partisan. After the war, he was a federal political leader in the Socialist Federal Republic of Yugoslavia. He led the Yugoslav delegation in peace talks with Italy over the border dispute in the Julian March.

Kardelj was the main creator of the Yugoslav system of workers' self-management. He was an economist and a full member of both the Slovene Academy of Sciences and Arts and the Serbian Academy of Sciences and Arts. He also played a major role in foreign policy by designing the fundamental ideological basis for the Yugoslav policy of nonalignment in the 1950s and the 1960s.

== Early years ==
Kardelj was born in Ljubljana. At the age of 16 he joined the Communist Party of Yugoslavia, where he was drafted under the influence of the Slovenian journalist Vlado Kozak. He studied to become a teacher but never worked as one. In 1930, he was arrested in Belgrade and convicted of being a member of the illegal Communist Party. He was released in 1932 and returned to Ljubljana, where he became one of the leaders of the Slovenian section of the party after most of its former members had either left the party or perished in Joseph Stalin's purges.

In 1935, he went to Moscow to work for the Comintern. He was part of a group that survived Stalin's purge of the Yugoslav Communist leadership. Following Stalin's appointment of Josip Broz Tito as party leader, Kardelj became a leading member of the Party. The new leadership, centered around Tito, Aleksandar Ranković and Kardelj, returned to Yugoslavia in 1937 and launched a new party policy, calling for a common antifascist platform of all Yugoslav left-wing forces and for a federalization of Yugoslavia. The same year, an autonomous Communist Party of Slovenia was formed, with Kardelj as one of its leaders, together with Franc Leskošek (sl) and Boris Kidrič.

On 15 August 1939, Kardelj married Pepca Maček, cousin of the (later) People's Hero and communist functionary Ivan Maček (a.k.a. Matija).

After the Axis invasion of Yugoslavia in April 1941, he became one of the leaders of the Liberation Front of the Slovenian People. In summer and autumn 1941, he helped to set up the armed resistance in Slovenia which fought against the occupying forces till May 1945, jointly with Tito's Partisans in what became known as the People's Liberation War of Yugoslavia.

== Postwar years ==
After 1945, he rose to the highest positions in the Yugoslav government and moved into a luxury house in the Tacen neighborhood of Ljubljana that was confiscated from its previous owner, the industrialist Ivan Seunig. The house had been built in 1940 by the architect Bojan Stupica (1910–1970) and was initially occupied by the communist politician Boris Kraigher.

Between 1945 and 1947, Kardelj led the Yugoslav delegation that negotiated peace talks with Italy over the border dispute in the Julian March. After the Tito–Stalin split in 1948, he helped, with Milovan Đilas and Vladimir Bakarić, to devise a new economic policy in the Federative People's Republic of Yugoslavia, known as workers' self-management. In the 1950s, especially after Đilas's removal, he rose to become the main theorist of Titoism and Yugoslav workers' self-management.

Kardelj was shot and wounded in 1959 by Jovan Veselinov. Although the official police investigation concluded that Veselinov had been shooting at a wild boar and Kardelj was struck by a ricochet from a rock, it was suggested at the time that the assassination attempt was orchestrated by his political rival Aleksandar Ranković or Ranković's, ally Slobodan Penezić.

Kardelj's role diminished in the 1960s, for reasons that have yet to become clear. He again rose to prominence after 1973, when Tito removed the Croatian, Serbian and Slovenian reformist Communist leaderships, and restored a more orthodox party line. The following year he was one of the main authors of the 1974 Yugoslav Constitution which decentralized decision-making in the country, leaving the single republics under the leadership of their respective political leaderships.

== Death and legacy ==
In 1974, Kardelj was diagnosed with colon cancer, and after diagnosed, his doctors consulted with American and Swedish doctors about further treatment. Shortly after returning from Washington D.C. in 1977, his health began to deteriorate. Later in 1977, Kardelj underwent two operations after it was discovered that the cancer had spread to his lungs and liver. At the end of 1978, he fell seriously ill. In January 1979, his health did not improve, so he was admitted to Ljubljana University Medical Centre in the beginning of February, where he fell into a coma on the 9th. On 10 February 1979, after being in a coma for 20 hours, Kardelj died at the age of 69.

Kardelj's funeral was held on 13 February 1979 in Ljubljana. His body was cremated and buried in the Ljubljana tomb of national heroes.

During his lifetime, he was given several honors. He was appointed a member of the Slovene Academy of Sciences and Arts and was officially honored as a People's Hero of Yugoslavia. Apart from many streets, the entire coastal town of Ploče in southern Croatia was renamed Kardeljevo in his honour from 1950 to 1954 and again from 1980 to 1990. Immediately after his death, the University of Ljubljana changed its name to "Edvard Kardelj University of Ljubljana" (Slovene: Univerza Edvarda Kardelja v Ljubljani).

After the collapse of Yugoslavia, most of these were restored to their previous names, but in Slovenia there are still some street and square names that bear his name; for example, a square in Nova Gorica and in Velenje.

Edvard Kardelj was the father of the poet Borut Kardelj, who committed suicide in 1971. His wife Pepca Kardelj died of a heart attack in 1990 but was widely rumored to have committed suicide. His grandson is Igor Šoltes, a lawyer and politician.

== Awards ==
- Order of the Yugoslav Great Star (1970)
- Order of the People's Hero (1951)
- Order of the Hero of Socialist Labour (1955, 1979)
- Order of People's Liberation (1945)
- Order of the Yugoslav Star with Sash
- Order of the Partisan Star, 1st class (1951)
- Commemorative Medal of the Partisans of 1941
- Albania:
  - Order of the Flag (1945)
- Egypt:
  - Grand Cordon of the Order of the Nile (1956)
- Poland:
  - Order of the Cross of Grunwald, 1st class (1946)
  - Gold Cross of Merit (1946)

== Sources ==
- Edvard Kardelj, Reminiscences: The struggle for recognition and independence of the new Yugoslavia, 1944–1957 (London: 1982)
- Széll, György. "Workers’ Participation in Yugoslavia." in The Palgrave Handbook of Workers’ Participation at Plant Level (Palgrave Macmillan, New York, 2019) pp. 167-186.
- Jože Pirjevec, Jugoslavija: nastanek, razvoj ter razpad Karadjordjevićeve in Titove Jugoslavije (Koper: Lipa, 1995).
- Janko Prunk, "Idejnopolitični nazor Edvarda Kardelja v okviru evropskega socializma" in Ferenčev zbornik, ed. Zdenko Čepič&Damijan Guštin (Ljubljana: Inštitut za novejšo zgodovino, 1997), 105-116.
- Alenka Puhar, "Avtorstvo Razvoja slovenskega narodnostnega vprašanja: Ali bi k Speransu sodil še Anin, Alfa, mogoče Bor?", Delo (29 August 2001), 16.
- Alenka Puhar, "Skrivnostna knjiga o Slovencih, ki že sedemdeset let čaka na objavo", Delo (3 October 2001), 26.
- Božo Repe, Rdeča Slovenija: tokovi in obrazi iz obdobja socializma (Ljubljana: Sophia, 2003).
