= Zgornji Kašelj =

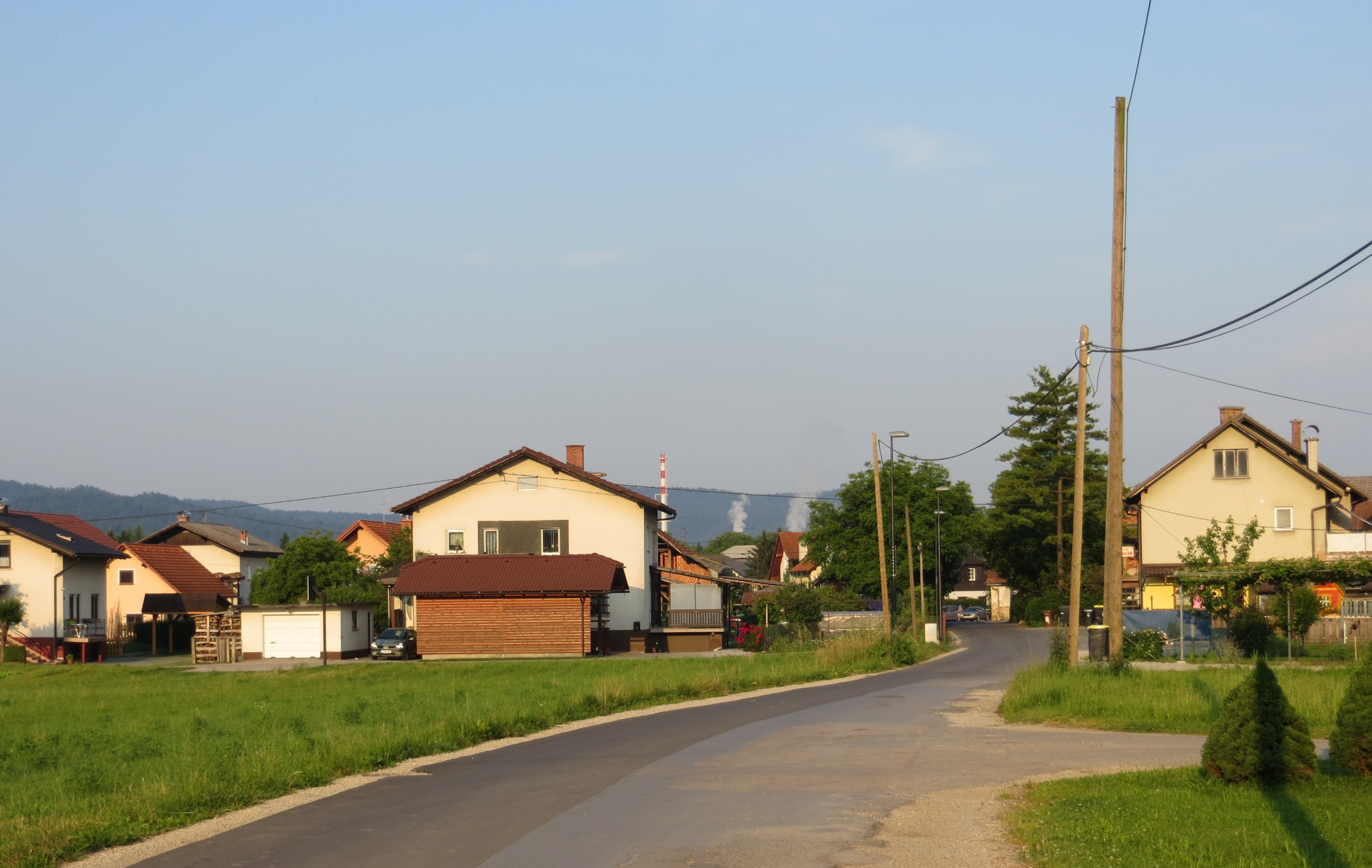

- Location in Slovenia
- Coordinates: 46°3′10.71″N 14°36′11.11″E
- Country: Slovenia
- Traditional region: Upper Carniola
- Statistical region: Central Slovenia
- Municipality: Ljubljana
- Elevation: 276 m (906 ft)

Zgornji Kašelj (pronounced [ˈzɡoːɾnji ˈkaːʃəl]; in older sources also Gorenji Kašelj, German: Oberkaschel) is a formerly independent settlement in the eastern part of the capital Ljubljana in central Slovenia. It lies on a terrace above the left bank of the Ljubljanica River and extends west to Vevče and the source of Bajer Creek. It is part of the traditional region of Upper Carniola and is now included with the rest of the municipality in the Central Slovenia Statistical Region. The western part of the settlement was known as Dravlje, but this name passed out of use in the 20th century.

== Name ==
Zgornji Kašelj was mentioned in written sources together with neighboring Spodnji Kašelj in 1360 as (Nieder)chaeschel and Kaeschel (and as Geschel in 1421, Ober Kassel in 1436, and Kaschell in 1496). The name is derived from German Kassel and it is likely that the German name is derived from Latin castellum 'castle', referring to one or both castles on Kašelj Hill (Slovene: Kašeljski grič) east of the settlement. However, it is also possible that the name is derived from Latin casale 'peasant house, peasant settlement'. In the past the German name was Oberkaschel.

== History ==
In 1516 and 1517 an estate owned by Jakob Logar was recorded in Zgornji Kašelj. Zgornji Kašelj was annexed by the City of Ljubljana in 1982, ending its existence as an independent settlement.

== Church ==
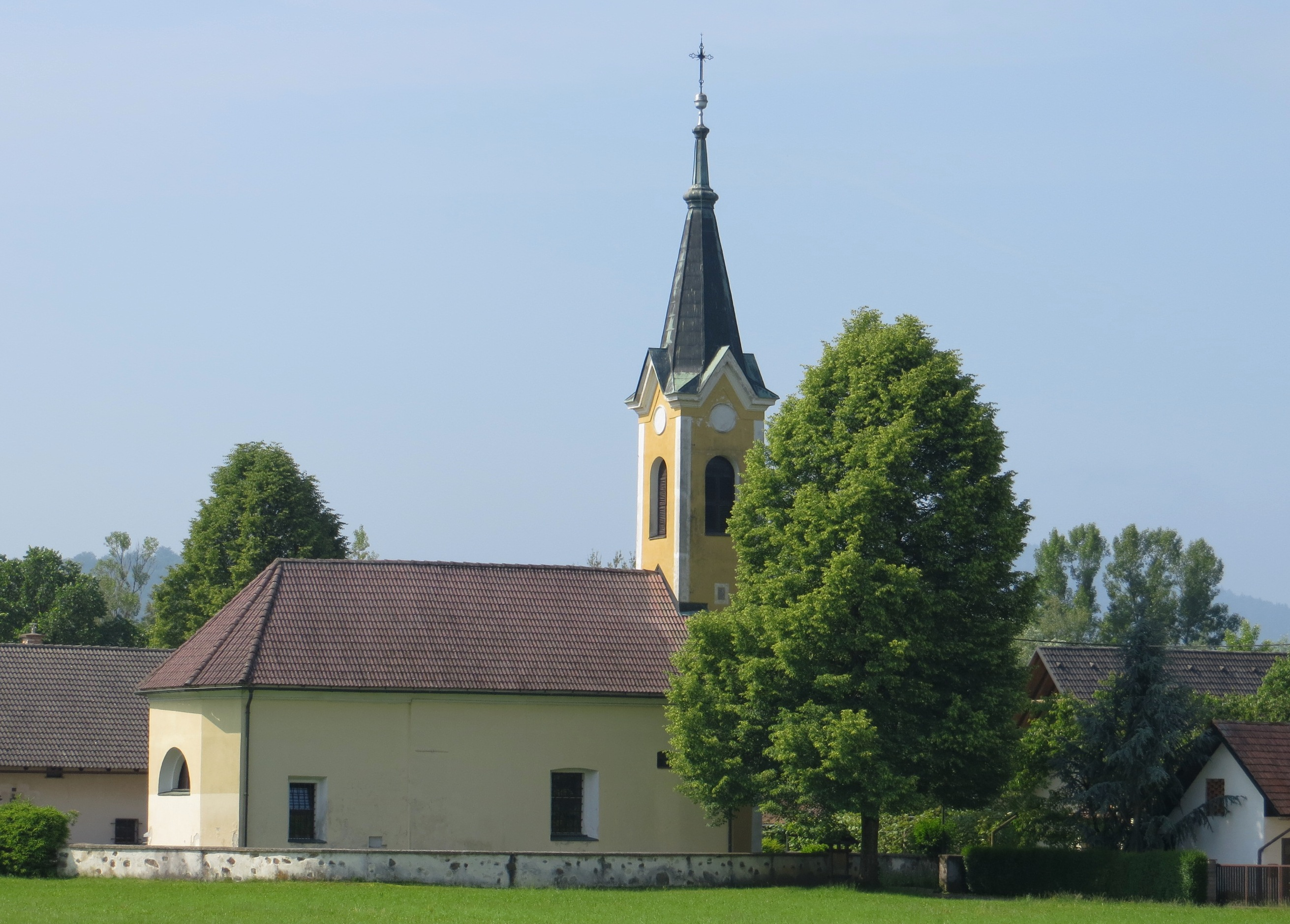
Saint Andrew's Church

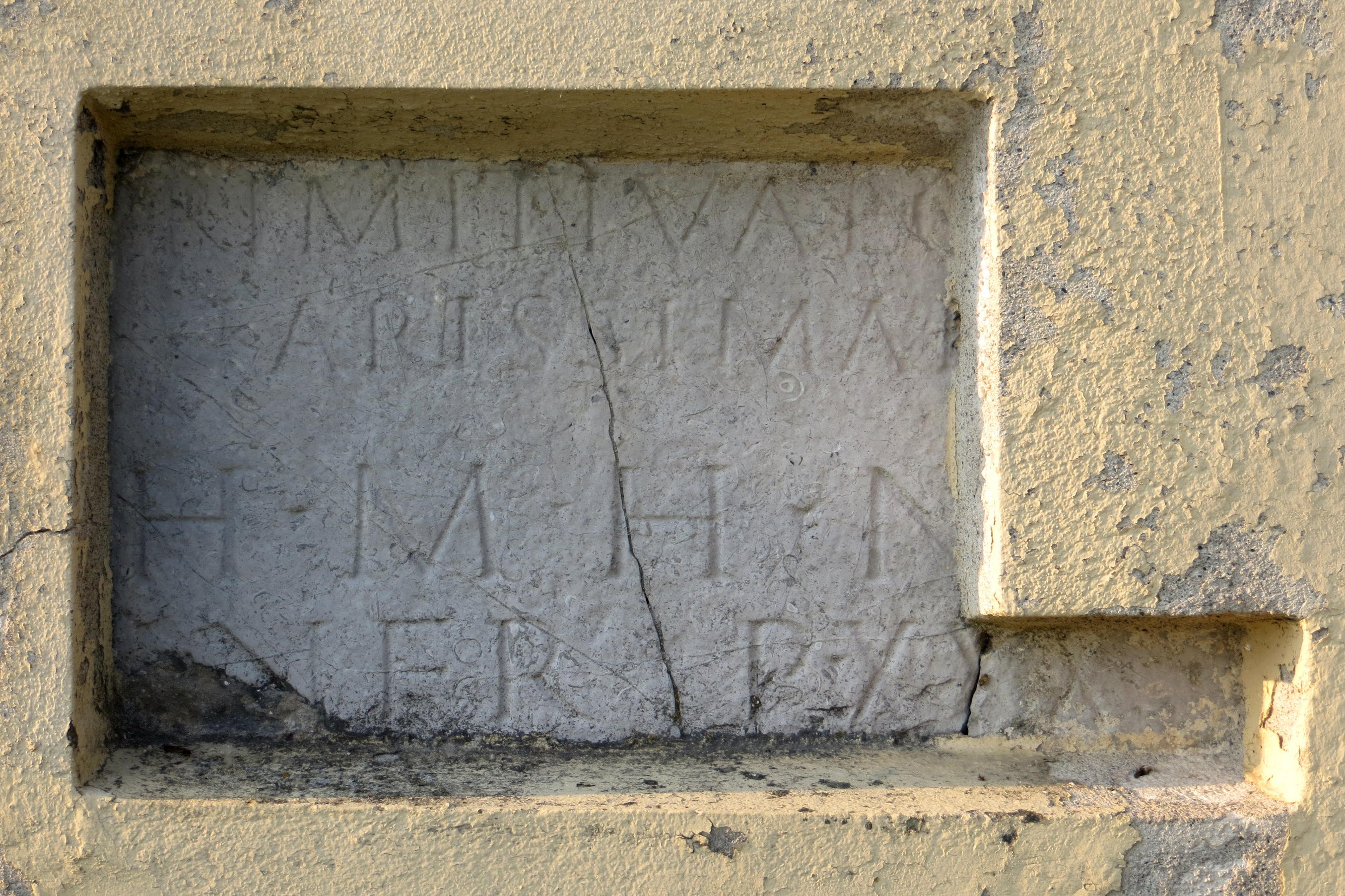
Roman gravestone in church wall

The church in Zgornji Kašelj is dedicated to Saint Andrew (Slovene: sveti Andrej). The church was first mentioned in written sources in 1520, when it was consecrated by Bishop Natalis de Turre. The church acquired its present form in the 18th century, and the altars date from the second half of the 19th century. The church has a choir railing with fine Rococo carving, which is said to have come from the Ursuline Church of the Holy Trinity in Ljubljana. The church contains a painting of Saint Agnes by Anton Cebej. A Roman gravestone is built into the exterior wall of the chancel.

== Notable people ==
Notable people that were born or lived in Zgornji Kašelj include:

- Franc Černe (born 1923), economist
- Franc Erjavec (1834–1887), writer
- Franc Škofič (1848–1892), legal writer and playwright
