= Janko Smole =

Slovenian politician

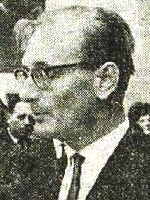
Smole in 1965

Janko Smole (2 June 1921 – 11 June 2010) was Yugoslav and Slovene politician who served as the president of the executive council of the Socialist Republic of Slovenia from 1965 to 1967. He was a member of the League of Communists of Slovenia. He was preceded by Viktor Avbelj and succeeded by Stane Kavčič. He was Finance Minister of Yugoslavia from 1967 to 1974.
