= Spasenija Babović =

Yugoslav politician

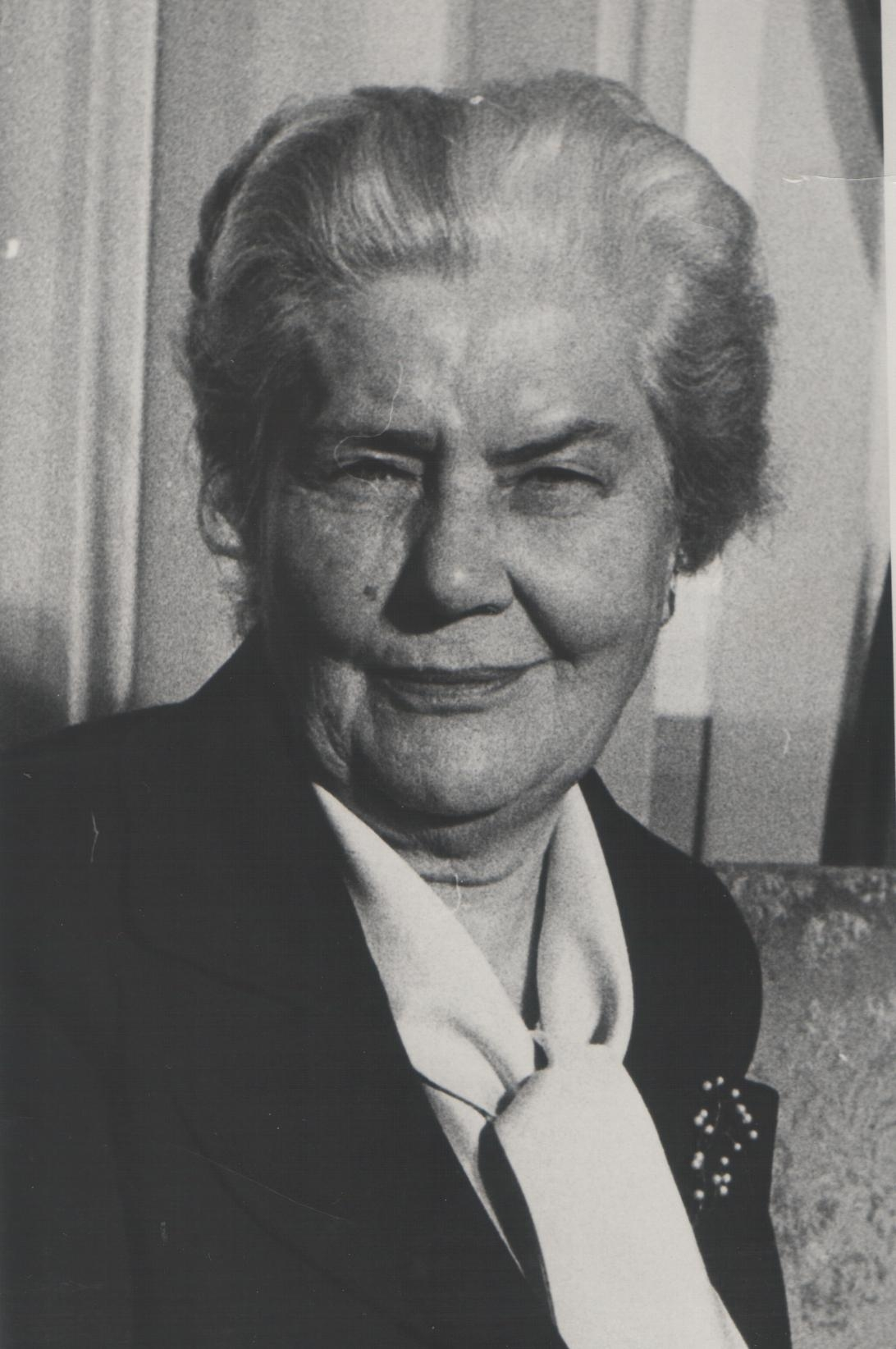
- Born: 25 March 1907; Lazarevac, Kingdom of Yugoslavia
- Died: 17 December 1977 (aged 70); Belgrade, Socialist Federal Republic of Yugoslavia
- Occupation: Yugoslav Partisan

Spasenija "Cana" Babović (25 March 1907, Lazarevac, Kingdom of Yugoslavia – 17 December 1977, Belgrade, SFR Yugoslavia) was a Yugoslav Partisan anti-fascist officer and communist revolutionary who participated in the resistance against Nazi German occupation of Yugoslavia, notable for supreme acts of courage. She survived at least one term of imprisonment with beatings and torture without disclosing any compromising information to the enemy. After the war, she was awarded titles "Hero of Socialist Labour" and "People's Hero of Yugoslavia."

At 18, she joined the trade union movement. Due to her participation in workers' strikes in the 1930s, she was arrested several times. In 1937, she was sentenced to two years in prison under the Law on the Protection of the State. After the German occupation of Yugoslavia, she became one of the main organizers of the Uprising in Serbia in 1941. She served as the deputy political commissar of the Second Proletarian Brigade and worked on recruiting women into the movement.

Achieving the rank of colonel in what became the Yugoslav People's Army, she was appointed to various political positions. She was appointed Minister of Labour 1946–1948, Minister of Health 1948–1953, and Deputy Prime Minister 1953–1963.
