= Boris Kraigher =

Slovenian communist politician

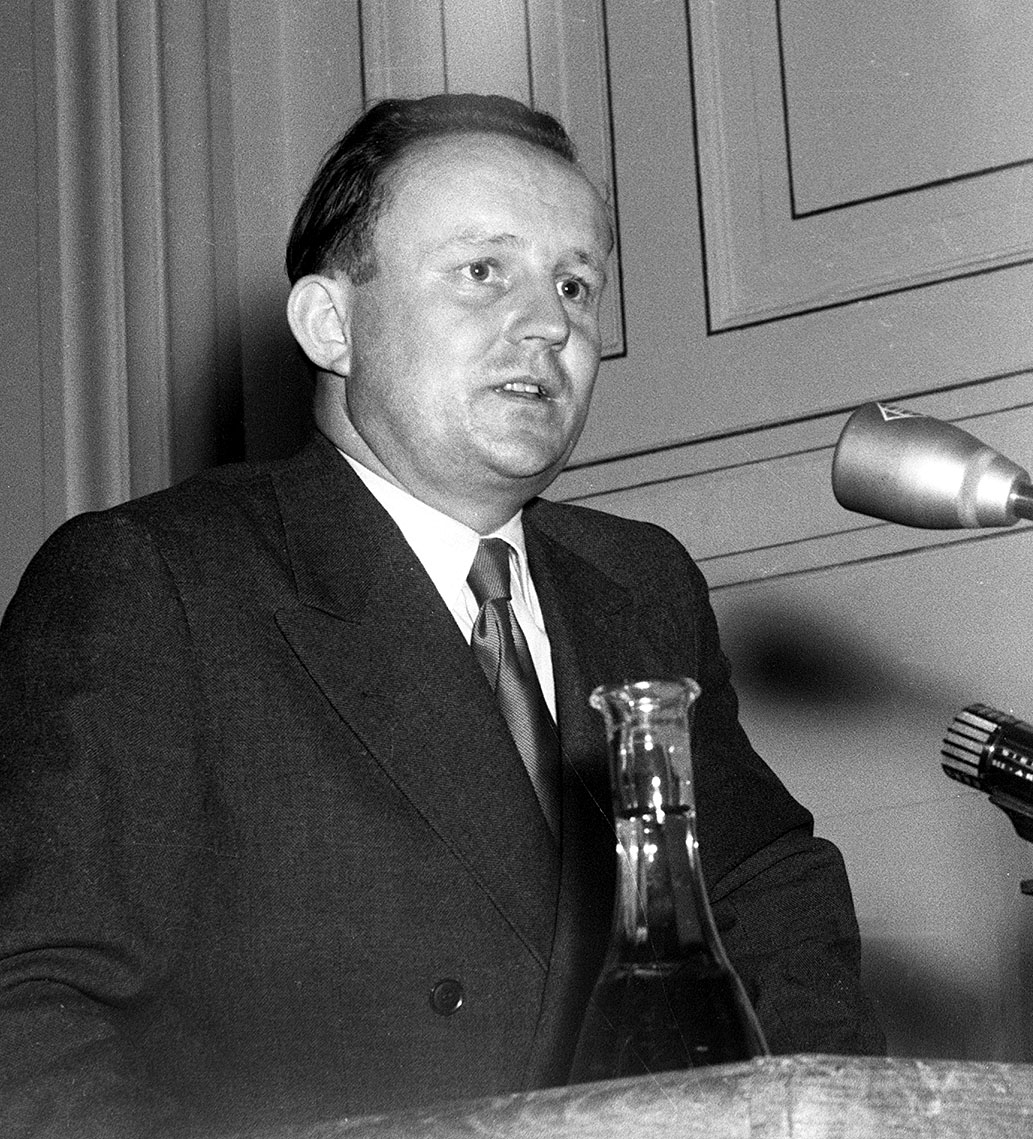

President of the Executive Council of the Socialist Republic of Slovenia
- In office December 15, 1953 – June 26, 1962
- Preceded by: Miha Marinko
- Succeeded by: Viktor Avbelj

Personal details
- Born: February 14, 1914; Sveta Trojica v Slovenskih Goricah, Styria, Austro-Hungary
- Died: January 4, 1967 (aged 52) near Sremska Mitrovica, Serbia, Yugoslavia

Boris Kraigher (February 14, 1914 – January 4, 1967) was a Slovenian and Yugoslavian communist politician.

Kraigher served as the president of the Executive Council of the Socialist Republic of Slovenia from December 15, 1953 to June 25, 1962. He was a member of the League of Communists of Slovenia. He was preceded by Miha Marinko and succeeded by Viktor Avbelj. Then he was sent to Belgrade as vice-president of the Federal Executive Council (Yugoslav government) and was killed in a car crash before he could be promoted to head of the federal government.
