= Pepca Kardelj =

Slovene partisan fighter

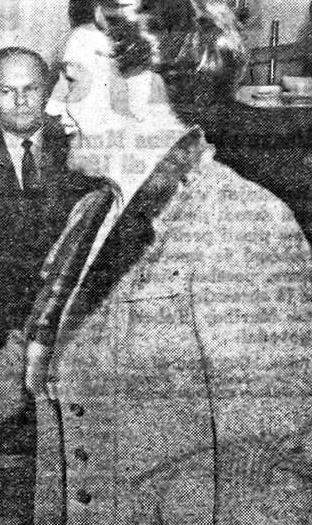
- Born: February 20, 1914
- Died: April 15, 1990 (aged 76)
- Occupation: Partisan fighter

Pepca Kardelj (née Pepca Maček; February 20, 1914 – April 15, 1990) was a Slovene Partisan and political activist. She fought as a communist partisan during World War II in Yugoslavia.

== Life and career ==
Kardelj became a member of the League of Communists of Slovenia in 1935, and she was the only woman present at the founding congress of the League of Communists of Slovenia. In 1941 she became involved in the Yugoslav resistance movement. In December 1941, Kardelj was captured, and she was imprisoned until the capitulation of Italy in 1943. She ultimately achieved the rank of lieutenant colonel in the Yugoslav People's Army.

Kardelj died of natural causes on April 15, 1990. It has been speculated that her death may have been related to a critique she published a few weeks earlier in weekly Tribuna criticizing the regime. The letter was, however, a forgery

Kardelj was awarded the Commemorative Medal of the Partisans of 1941. She was married to Deputy Prime Minister of Yugoslavia Edvard Kardelj, and her cousin was President of the Slovenian People's Assembly Ivan Maček.

== Selected awards ==
- Order of Merit for the People, degree I (sl)
- Order of Brotherhood and Unity, degrees I and II (sl)
- Yugoslav Order of Bravery
- Commemorative Medal of the Partisans of 1941
