= Polje (Ljubljana) =

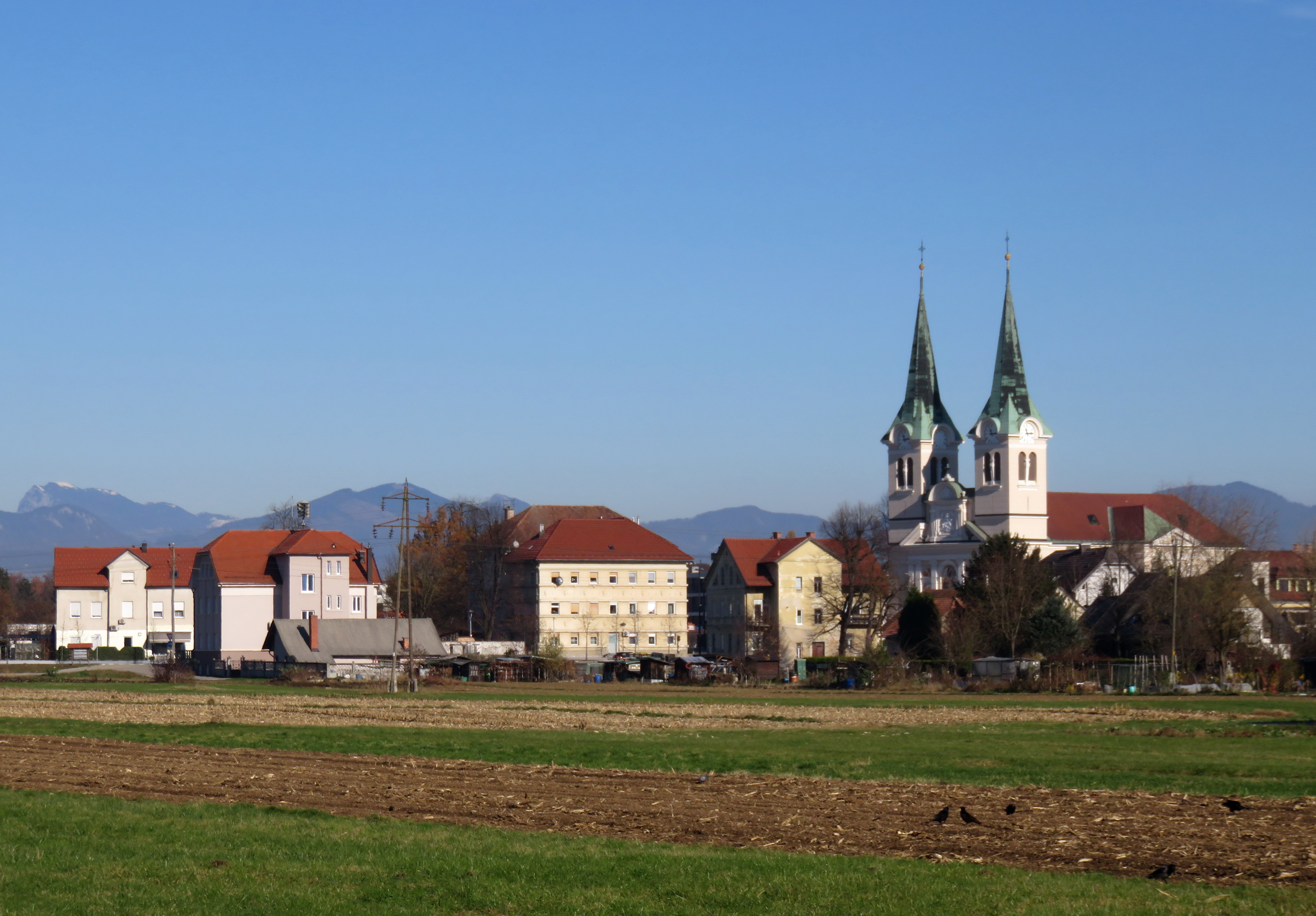

- Location in Slovenia
- Coordinates: 46°3′28.69″N 14°35′0.52″E
- Country: Slovenia
- Traditional region: Upper Carniola
- Statistical region: Central Slovenia
- Municipality: Ljubljana
- Elevation: 282 m (925 ft)

Polje (pronounced [ˈpoːljɛ]; German: Mariafeld) is a former village in the eastern part of the City Municipality of Ljubljana, the capital of Slovenia.

== Name ==
Polje was attested in written sources in 1499 as ecclesiam beate Virginis Marie in Campo. The name of the village was changed from Devica Marija v Polju (literally, 'the Virgin Mary in the field') to Polje in 1952. The name was changed on the basis of the 1948 Law on Names of Settlements and Designations of Squares, Streets, and Buildings as part of efforts by Slovenia's postwar communist government to remove religious elements from toponyms. In the past the German name was Mariafeld.

== History ==
A school was established in Polje in 1862, when the first school building was also built. New school buildings were built in 1931 and 1957, and a music school was established in 1960. The Ljubljana airport was located in the western part of Polje until 1959; experimental flights were carried out at the airport as early as 1910. Polje was annexed by the City of Ljubljana in 1982, ending its existence as an independent settlement.

== Main sights ==
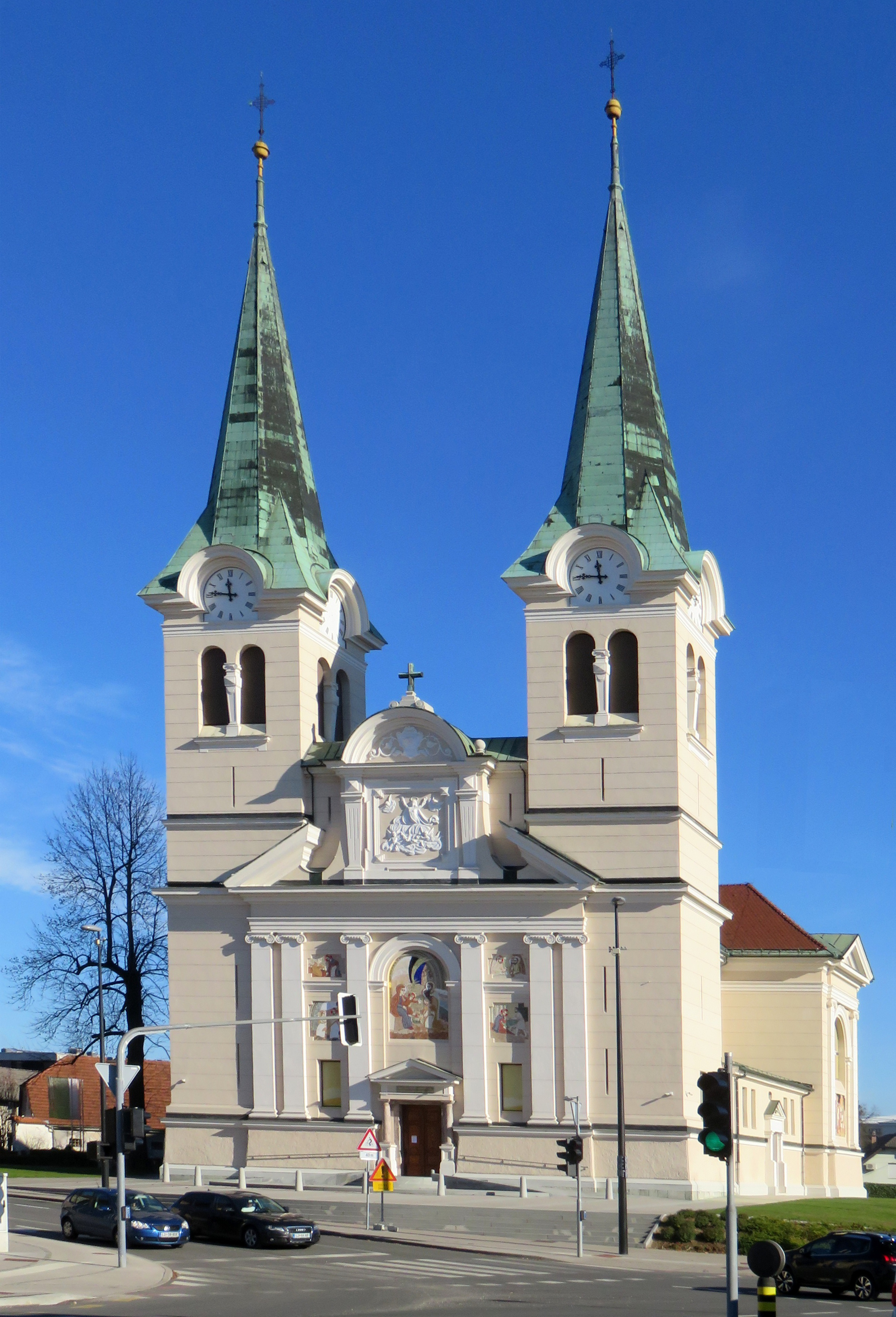
Assumption Church

The parish church in Polje is dedicated to the Assumption of Mary. Construction of the church began in 1895, and it was consecrated in 1897. The church was designed by Raimund Jeblinger.

== Notable people ==
Notable people that were born or lived in Polje include:

- Kajetan Hueber (1810–1870), composer
- Zorka Regancin (a.k.a. Ruška, 1921–1944), communist, Partisan, and People's Hero of Yugoslavia
