= Stane Kavčič =

Slovene politician and political commissar (1919–1987)

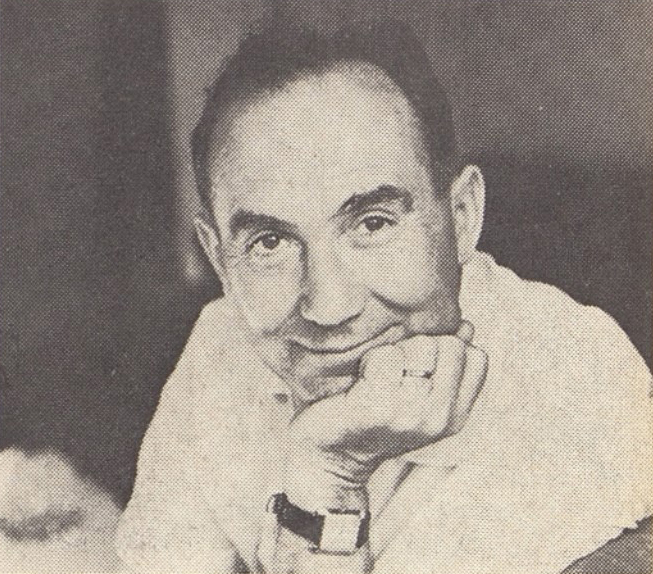
Stane Kavčič

Stane Kavčič (30 October 1919 – 27 March 1987) was a Slovenian communist politician within the Socialist Federal Republic of Yugoslavia.

He joined the Communist Party of Yugoslavia in 1941 and participated in the Liberation Front of the Slovene Nation. Within the Socialist Republic of Slovenia, he was vice president of the presidium of the People's Assembly (1949–1950), vice president (1951–1956) and president (1967–1972) of the executive council, the latter post being the equivalent of prime minister. Economic reform had been initiated in 1965, and while in office, he continued liberal policies of regional development, expansion of the tertiary sector of the economy, increased in exports and openness toward the West. Scandals that marked his administration included the 1968 Ciril Žebot scandal, the 1969 Road Scandal and the 1971 scandal of the 25 delegates. In autumn 1971, party conservatives began organizing a purge of liberals from Slovenia's institutions. Kavčič was forced to resign the following year and was excluded from public life until his death in Ljubljana.
