= Viktor Avbelj =

Yugoslav Partisan and Slovenian politician

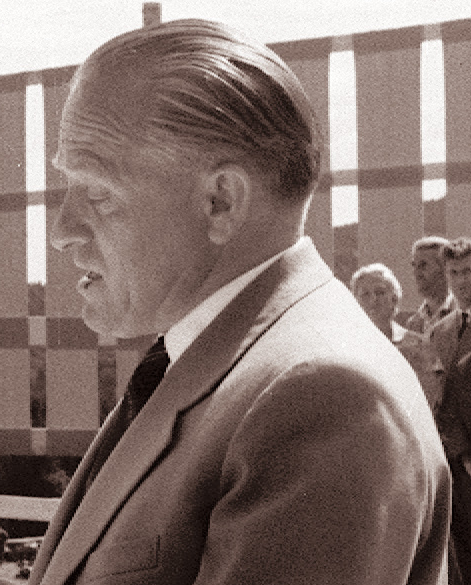
- Born: February 26, 1914; Prevoje pri Šentvidu, Austria-Hungary (now Slovenia)
- Died: April 6, 1993 (aged 79)

Viktor Avbelj, nom de guerre Rudi (February 26, 1914 – April 6, 1993), was a Yugoslav Partisan and Slovenian politician. He was a member of the League of Communists of Slovenia.

As a student, he joined the Communist Party in 1937. From September to December 1942, he was the first political commissar of the Gubec Brigade, and afterwards the political commissar of the 1st operational zone, and from July 1943, the 15th division. In July 1943, while observing the enemy's positions near Selah pri Šumberk, he narrowly escaped death in a shelling. From September 1944 to March 1945, he was the political commissar of the 9th Corps of the NOVJ, and then until May 1945 the political commissar of the Main Staff of the NOV and POS and the Slovenian representative at the 4th Army of the Yugoslav Army. He was a recipient of the Order of the People's Hero, along with other honors for his Partisan activities during WWII.

From May to August 1945, he was the deputy head of OZNA for Slovenia. Until November 1945, he performed duties of the organizational secretary of the Central Committee of the Communist Party. From November 1945 to November 1946, he was the secretary of the District Committee of the Party for its Maribor division. From November 1946 to March 1948, he was Prosecutor for the State Security Administration.

He served as the president of the executive council of the Socialist Republic of Slovenia (SRS) from June 25, 1962, to 1965 after having previously served as the vice-president. He had been preceded by Boris Kraigher, and was succeeded by Janko Smole. From 1979 to 1984, he was the chairman of the SRS presidency. Before that, he was a member of the federation council from 1963 to 1973, and after his term as chairman had ended, again from 1984 to 1990. He was one of the key planners of the economic development of the Socialist Republic of Slovenia.

On April 3, 1993, he shot himself with a pistol and died a few days later.
