= Zalog (Ljubljana) =

Settlement in Upper Carniola, Slovenia

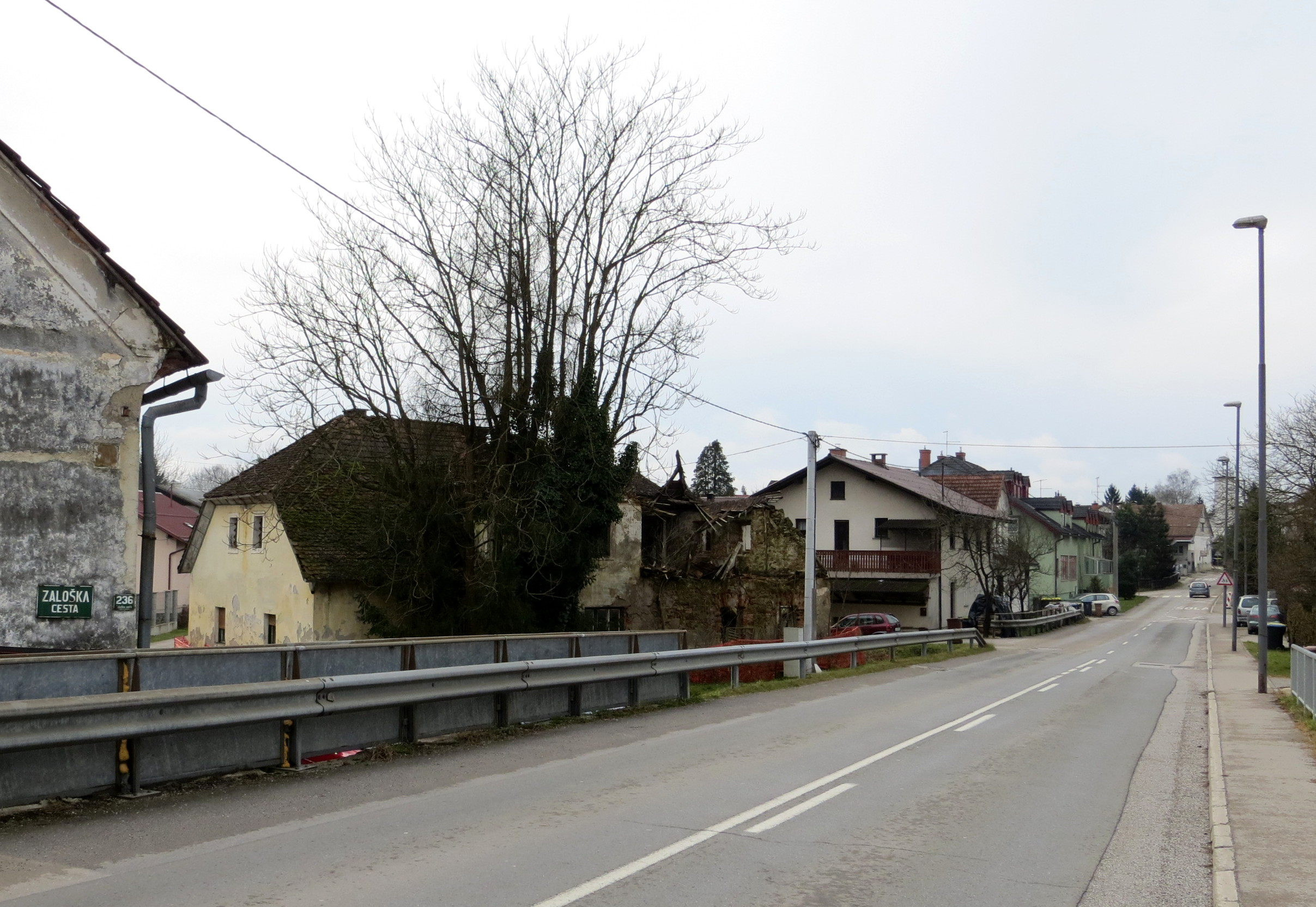

- Location in Slovenia
- Coordinates: 46°3′47.43″N 14°37′1.30″E
- Country: Slovenia
- Traditional region: Upper Carniola
- Statistical region: Central Slovenia
- Municipality: Ljubljana
- Elevation: 275 m (902 ft)

Zalog (pronounced [ˈzaːlɔk]; German: Salloch) is a formerly independent settlement in the eastern part of the capital Ljubljana in central Slovenia. It stands above the left bank of the Ljubljanica River near its confluence with the Sava. It is part of the traditional region of Upper Carniola and is now included with the rest of the municipality in the Central Slovenia Statistical Region. The former village includes the hamlets of Stari Zalog, which is the old village core on a terrace between the railroad line and a bridge across the Sava, Novi Zalog to the south, Brinje north of the railroad toward the Sava River, Prod to the east on the spit between the Ljubljanica and the Sava, Gradišče on the left bank of the Ljubljanica, and Vabrje on a small rise between the two rivers.

== Geography ==
Studenčica Creek flows through the hamlet of Prod, past the former Stele Mill, before emptying into the Ljubljanica. The soil in the settlement is sandy to the north and loamy to the south. The area has been heavily industrialized, with activities that have included slaughterhouses, meat processing, a fish hatchery, and tin can production.

== Name ==
Zalog was attested in written sources in 1336 as Zalog (and as Zaloch in 1339 and Salog in 1361). The name is a fused prepositional phrase that has lost case inflection: za + log, literally 'behind a partially forested (marshy) meadow near water' or 'behind woods near a settlement'. In the past the German name was Salloch.

== History ==
In the hamlet of Gradišče there are the remains of a fortification from Late Antiquity, testifying to early settlement in the area. Until the railroad was built in 1849, Zalog was an important river port. It was the final station and also a customs station for boats being pulled up the river from the Croatian border. The river port was established in the late Middle Ages, and convicts were used to pull the boats in teams of up to 30 men. In 1730 the channel was deepened and teams of horses or oxen were used to pull the boats, which were up to 30 m long and transported up to 60 tons of freight. The freight was unloaded and stored in Zalog, and in 1779 a crane and warehouses were installed based on a plan by Jožef Šemerl. The railroad brought an end to the boat traffic; a livestock market operated on the spit until 1905, and washerwomen laundered clothing at the river port. A school was established in Zalog in 1910. In the spring of 1920 there was a major railroad workers' strike in Zalog; on 24 April that year the striking workers advanced on Ljubljana and were shot at by the police. Zalog was annexed by the City of Ljubljana in 1982, ending its existence as an independent settlement.

== Cultural heritage ==
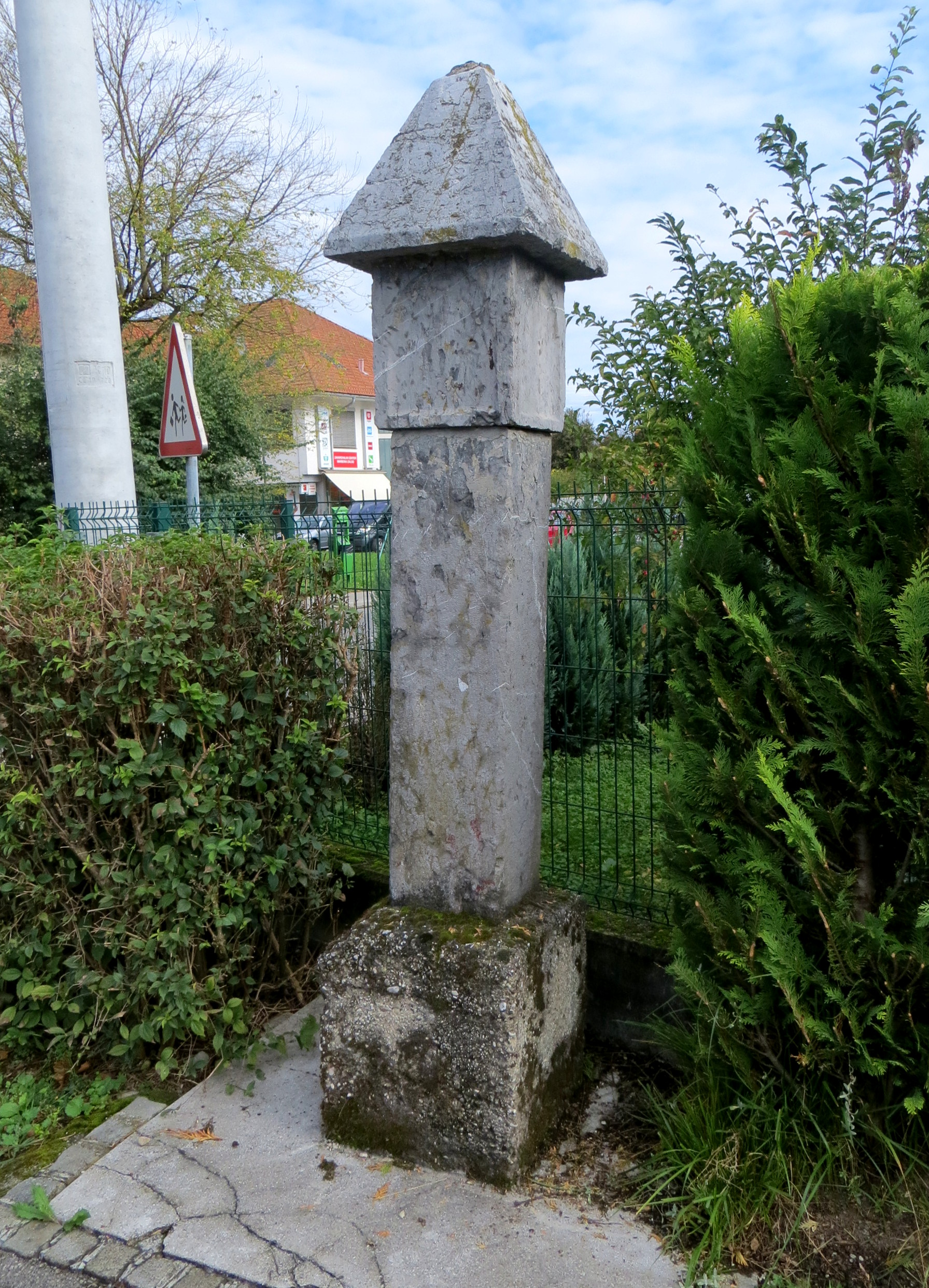
Plague column

There is a plague column in Zalog opposite the civic center. It bears the year 1793.

== Notable people ==
Notable people that were born or lived in Zalog include:

- Dragojila Milek (1850–1889), poet
- Ivan Perdan (1837–1899), businessman and patriot
- Ivan Resman (1848–1905), poet
