= 1989 Serbian general election =

- Presidential election
- 12 November 1989
- Turnout: 83.55%
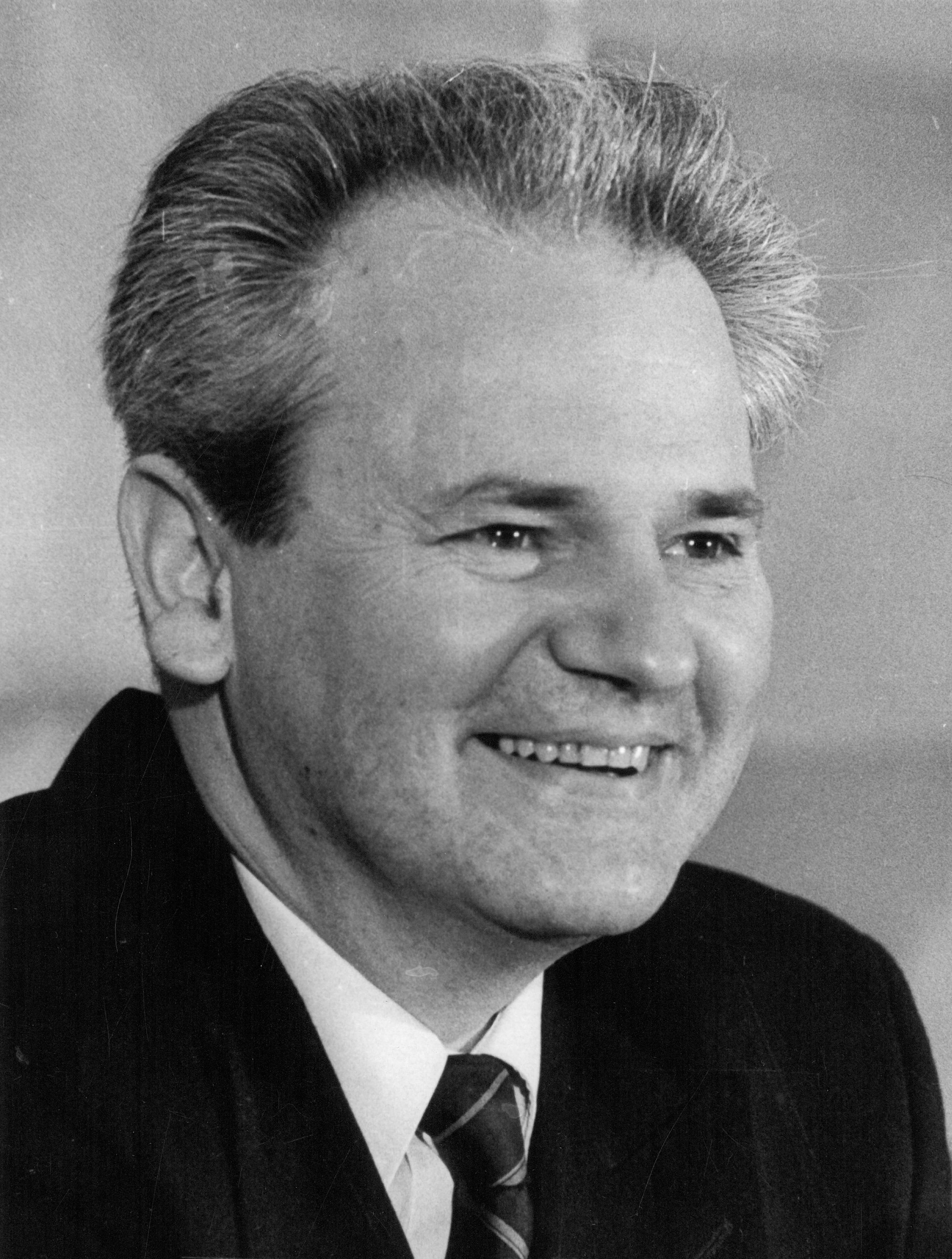

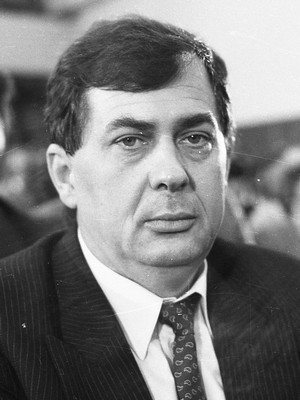

Candidate	Slobodan Milošević	Mihalj Kertes	Zoran Pjanić
Party	SKS	SKS	SKS
Popular vote	4,452,312	480,924	404,853
Percentage	80.36%	8.68%	7.31%
President of the Presidency before election
Slobodan Milošević
SKS
Elected President of the Presidency
Slobodan Milošević
SKS
- Parliamentary election
- 10, 12, and 30 November 1989
- All 340 seats in the Assembly of SR Serbia; 171 seats needed for a majority
- Turnout: 82.35%
Party	Leader	Seats	+/–
SKS	Bogdan Trifunović	303	−20
Independents	–	37	+20
This lists parties that won seats. See the complete results below.
Prime Minister before	Prime Minister after
Desimir Jevtić; SKS	Stanko Radmilović; SKS

General elections were held in Serbia, a constituent federal unit of SFR Yugoslavia, on 12 November 1989, to elect the president of the presidency of the Socialist Republic of Serbia and delegates of the Assembly of SR Serbia. Voting for delegates also took place on 10 and 30 November 1989. In addition to the general elections, local elections were held simultaneously. These were the first direct elections conducted after the adoption of the 1974 Yugoslav Constitution and the delegate electoral system, and the last elections conducted under a one-party system.

The election was preceded by the rise of Slobodan Milošević, who, after being elected president of the presidency of the Central Committee of the League of Communists of Serbia (SKS) in 1986, ousted his mentor Ivan Stambolić and his allies from key positions in 1987. The anti-bureaucratic revolution began and the constitution of Serbia was amended after Milošević came to power. After Milošević was appointed to the position of president of the presidency of SR Serbia in May 1989, presidential and parliamentary elections were announced for November 1989.

Milošević, Mihalj Kertes, Zoran Pjanić, and Miroslav Đorđević were candidates in the presidential election; Milošević won the election in a landslide. SKS won 303 seats, a net loss of 20 seats in comparison with the 1986 election, and 37 individuals who were not members of SKS won the rest of the seats in the Assembly. The League of Communists of Yugoslavia ceased to exist in 1990, and after a referendum in July 1990, Serbia adopted a new constitution that implemented a multi-party system and reduced the powers of its autonomous provinces, Kosovo and Vojvodina. The first multi-party elections were then held in December 1990.

== Background ==
=== Post-World War II ===
After World War II, the Communist Party consolidated power in Yugoslavia, transforming the country into a socialist state. Each constituent republic had its own branch of the Communist Party, with Serbia having the Communist Party of Serbia. The federal Communist Party renamed itself the League of Communists of Yugoslavia (SKJ) at its 6th Congress in 1952. Its branches did the same; the Communist Party of Serbia became the League of Communists of Serbia (SKS). Josip Broz Tito was the president of SKJ until his death in 1980.

After Tito's death, Yugoslavia was faced with issues related to the economy, constitutional problems, and a potential rise in ethnic nationalism. Yugoslavia initially implemented austerity measures to reduce its debt. A swift increase in debt, inflation, and unemployment was seen in the 1980s instead. According to publicist Zlatoje Martinov, the republics got "stronger and became de facto states with their own armed forces" (sve više jačaju i predstavljaju faktičke države sa sopstvenim oružanim snagama) because of the crises. Martinov also said that the gradual process of the dissolution of Yugoslavia was underway. Following the 1986 parliamentary election, Desimir Jevtić became the prime minister of Serbia.

=== Rise of Slobodan Milošević ===
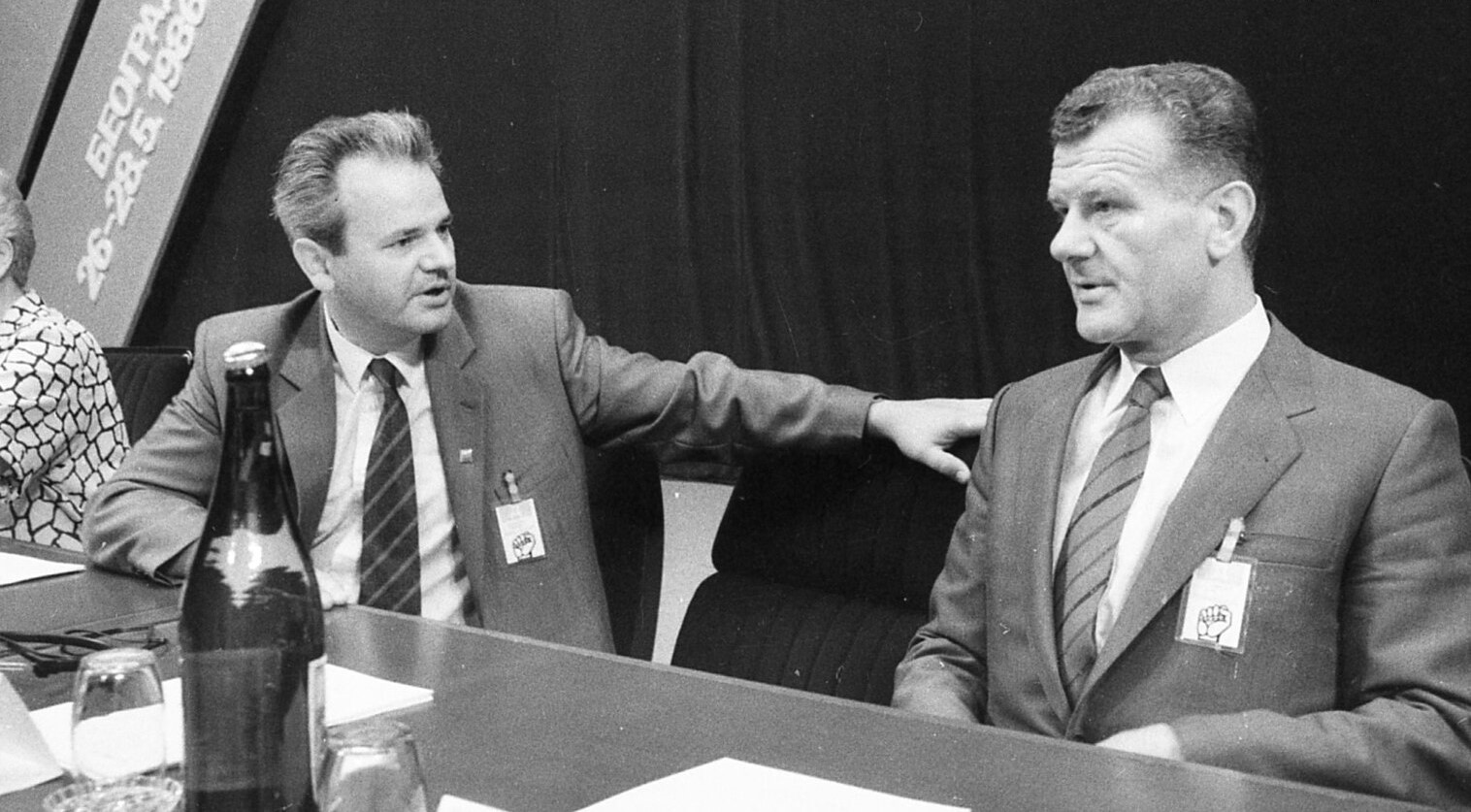
Slobodan Milošević (left) rose to power after removing Ivan Stambolić (right) and his allies from key positions in 1987

Ivan Stambolić, the president of the City Committee of the League of Communists of Belgrade, was elected president of the presidency of the Central Committee of SKS in 1984. Considered a political reformist within SKS, Stambolić was the mentor of Slobodan Milošević, his colleague from the University of Belgrade Faculty of Law. After becoming the president of the presidency of the Central Committee of SKS in 1984, Stambolić appointed Milošević as his successor to his previous role, despite opposition from older Communist officials. Milošević then began forming a faction of officials that were loyal to him.

Prior to the 1986 parliamentary election, Stambolić announced that he would step down from his position as the head of SKS. Despite receiving support from 84 municipal boards of SKS, Milošević was still met with strong opposition inside the party. There were proposals to have several candidates in the leadership election, although, the presidency voted 12–8 to propose Milošević as the sole candidate for the president of the presidency of the Central Committee of SKS. Milošević was successfully elected president of SKS in May 1986, while Stambolić also began serving as president of Serbia after being elected by the presidency of the Central Committee of SKS. Dragiša Pavlović, a reformist and Stambolić's ally, also became the president of the City Committee of the League of Communists of Belgrade.

Milošević took a populist turn in April 1987. He began portraying himself as a supporter of Kosovo Serbs, and during one visit to Kosovo, he said to Serbs that "no one will dare to beat you" (ne sme niko da vas bije). During the same period, he became more critical of Stambolić and Pavlović, particularly due to their moderate stance on Kosovo. Milošević called for a session of the Central Committee of SKS to be held in September 1987. At the session, Stambolić tried to reconcile Pavlović and Milošević, but Milošević instead criticised Stambolić and Pavlović. Pavlović and Stambolić's other allies were then dismissed from their positions. Some political scientists have characterised the session as a coup d'état. Stambolić was isolated after the session and was removed from the position of president of Serbia in December 1987. He then retired from politics.

Beginning in 1988, protests, dubbed the anti-bureaucratic revolution, began in Serbia and Montenegro in support of Milošević's centralisation programme. Although Milošević denied that he was directly involved in the protests, he actually had direct contact with the organisers. In Montenegro, the leadership was forced to resign. It was replaced by the pro-Milošević faction, led by Momir Bulatović. This soon followed in Vojvodina and Kosovo. In Vojvodina, Mihalj Kertes particularly became a prominent figure due to his statement, "How can you Serbs be afraid of Serbia, when I, a Hungarian, am not afraid of Serbia?". The Socialist Alliance of Working People of Serbia (SSRNS), a popular front organisation subordinate to SKS, proposed Milošević to the position of president of the presidency of the Socialist Republic of Serbia and was successfully appointed on 8 May 1989.

=== Constitutional changes ===
The aftermath of the 1988–1989 anti-bureaucratic revolution saw amendments to the 1974 Yugoslav Constitution. As part of the 1974 constitution, Kosovo was granted full autonomy and was given equal voting status like the other six constituent republics. Following the protests in March 1989, Milošević proposed amendments that were soon accepted by the Assembly of SAP Kosovo and the Assembly of SR Serbia. The amendment revoked the powers that autonomous provinces Kosovo and Vojvodina received in the 1974 constitution.

== Electoral system ==
At the time of the 1989 elections, Serbia's electoral system was in accordance with the 1974 constitution. Instead of directly electing members of the Assembly, citizens voted for the composition of delegation bodies. Members of these delegation bodies then elected delegates that served in the Assembly of SR Serbia. The voting system was complex; it combined elements of a direct, indirect, and first-past-the-post voting majoritarian system. Those who were 15 or older had the right to vote, and those who served in the army at the time of the elections were able to vote at their military stations. Invalid ballots were introduced with the 1989 elections; ballots that were blank or ballots that could not be used to determine who was voted for would be considered invalid.

The Assembly was divided into three councils. The Council of Associated Labour had 160 delegates, while the Council of Municipalities and Socio-Political Council each had 90 delegates. The delegates then elected members of the Presidency of the Socialist Republic of Serbia, the Council of the Republic, and a member of the Presidency of the Socialist Federal Republic of Yugoslavia. At the time of the 1989 elections, Serbia was still a one-party state but the 1989 elections were the first direct elections to be held since 1974.

The parliamentary election was conducted on three separate days: 10, 12, and 30 November 1989. Local elections were conducted on the same days as the parliamentary elections. The presidential election was only held on 12 November. Polling stations were opened from 07:00 (UTC+01:00) to 19:00.

=== Political parties ===
The table below lists political parties elected to the Assembly of SR Serbia after the 1986 parliamentary election. In the Council of Associated Labour, there were 148 SKS delegates; in the Council of Municipalities, there were 88 SKS delegates; and in the Socio-Political Council, there were 87 SKS delegates. Most of the delegates were 50 years old or younger.

Name	Leader	1986 result
Name	Leader	Seats
League of Communists of Serbia	Ivan Stambolić	323 / 340
Independents	–	17 / 340

== Conduct ==
Following Milošević's appointment to the position of president of the presidency of SR Serbia, elections were called to dismiss any potential criticism on whether Milošević's appointment was "the wish of the people" (želja čitavog naroda). The presidential election thus served as a referendum on whether Milošević should retain his position as president of the presidency. SKS stated that these "elections should show that we believe in the policies of our leadership" (izbori treba da pokažu da verujemo u politiku svog rukovodstva). At the time of the election, Bogdan Trifunović was the president of the presidency of the Central Committee of SKS. As part of the pre-election campaign, over 10,000 delegation body conferences were organised in Serbia. There were 19,478 delegation bodies that had 346,518 members in total.

=== Presidential candidates ===
At a SSRNS session on 1 November 1989, Milošević was officially proposed as a presidential candidate. So the presidential election would be perceived as democratic, multiple candidates were proposed for the election by SSRNS. However, no candidate initially wanted to risk running against Milošević. SSRNS then proposed the final four candidates, these being Milošević, Kertes, and professors Zoran Pjanić and Miroslav Đorđević.

== Results ==
According to a Politika report from November 1989, 14,855 polling stations were opened during the elections. The results of the elections were announced on 20 November, eight days after the election was held.

=== Presidential election ===
Beginning on 13 November, Radio-Television Belgrade and Politika reported turnouts and results. It was reported that in Kuršumlija that 99 percent of voters voted for Milošević, and that in some villages of the municipality of Kraljevo, Milošević won all votes. Similar results were reported in Kačanik, while in Vučitrn, Kertes won the most votes. In the Sandžak region, Milošević won the most votes. The turnout was later reported to be at 83 percent and Milošević won 80 percent of all votes cast. Milošević won most of his votes in Central Serbia, followed by Vojvodina, and then Kosovo, where he only won 25 percent of the popular vote. In Belgrade, Milošević received 93 percent of the popular vote. Pjanić placed second with 4 percent, Kertes third with 3.3 percent, and Đorđević fourth with 2.7 percent. Turnout in Belgrade was 80.3 percent.

Candidate	Party	Votes	%
Slobodan Milošević	League of Communists of Serbia	4,452,312	80.36
Mihalj Kertes	League of Communists of Serbia	480,924	8.68
Zoran Pjanić	League of Communists of Serbia	404,853	7.31
Miroslav Đorđević	League of Communists of Serbia	202,627	3.66
Total		5,540,716	100.00
Total votes		5,540,716	–
Registered voters/turnout		6,631,839	83.55
Source: Republic Electoral Commission

=== Parliamentary election ===
For the parliamentary elections, there were 6,640,675 registered citizens who had the right to vote in total. 82 percent of the registered voters exercised their right to vote in the election. In the parliamentary election, SKS won 303 seats in the Assembly of SR Serbia, a decrease of 20 seats in comparison with the 1986 parliamentary election. 37 of those who were not affiliated with SKS were elected in the election. In the Council of Associated Labour, 134 SKS delegates were elected; in the Council of Municipalities, 84 SKS delegates were elected; and in the Socio-Political Council, 85 SKS delegates were elected.

Party	Votes	%	Seats	+/–
League of Communists of Serbia			303	–20
Independents			37	+20
Total			340	0
Total votes	5,468,717	–		
Registered voters/turnout	6,640,675	82.35		
Source: Republic Bureau of Statistics

== Aftermath ==
=== Assembly leadership ===
The Assembly of SR Serbia was constituted on 5 December 1989. Zoran Sokolović was elected president of the Assembly, while Vukašin Jokanović, Slobodan Janjić, and Đorđe Šćepančević were elected vice-presidents of the Assembly. Stanko Radmilović was elected prime minister of Serbia, while on 6 December, the Assembly of SR Serbia officially declared Milošević as the president of the presidency. Radmilović was a Milošević loyalist.

=== Dissolution of SKJ ===
League of Communists of Yugoslavia (logo shown) ceased to exist as the result of the 14th congress

Milošević proposed reforms to the Federal Assembly of Yugoslavia in 1989. These proposals were opposed by the Slovene delegation, which favoured keeping the composition in accordance with the 1974 constitution. Because of the dispute, the first and only extraordinary congress was organised for 1990. The 14th congress, held in Sava Centar, Belgrade, was eventually organised for 20–23 January 1990. Presided over by Milan Pančevski, the congress was attended by over 1,600 delegates from all six constituent republics and two autonomous provinces.

The congress started with a polemic between Borut Pahor and Milomir Minić, and it continued with Milan Kučan saying that Slovenes reject Serbia's proposed centralisation policies. Ciril Ribičič and the Slovene delegation expressed their disappointment with the first plenary session of the 14th congress. The head of the Serbian delegation, Milošević, proposed to introduce a "one man–one vote" system but, this was also opposed by the Slovene delegation, which favoured the reconstruction of SKJ and Yugoslavia to a confederal system instead. With the help of Kosovo, Vojvodina, Montenegro, and Yugoslav People's Army delegates, all proposals from the Slovene and Bosnian delegations were rejected while Serbia's proposals were accepted.

At the second plenary session, the Slovene delegation left the Congress, stating that they did not want to be responsible "for the agony of LC of Yugoslavia into which the current impositions of will and the bearers of those impositions are leading it" (ne žele biti suodgovorni za agoniju SK Jugoslavije u koju je vode sadašnja nametanja volje i nosioci tih nametanja). Despite Milošević wanting to continue the congress without the Slovene delegation, the Croatian delegation, led by Ivica Račan, objected to this. The Croatian delegation, joined by the Macedonian and Bosnian and Herzegovinian delegations, left the congress soon after. Pančevski adjourned the session to 3 a.m. for 23 January; on 23 January, the rest of Serbia's proposals were accepted. The third plenary session of the 14th congress never occurred, and SKJ ceased to exist.

=== 1990 constitutional referendum ===
While Serbia was still a one-party state, a referendum was organised in July 1990 on whether to adopt a new constitution or to hold multi-party elections first. A majority of voters voted in favour of adopting a new constitution despite Kosovo Albanians boycotting the referendum; the constitution was adopted in September 1990. The first multi-party elections were held in December 1990.

With the adoption of the 1990 constitution, the autonomous provinces of Kosovo and Vojvodina were renamed to Autonomous Province of Kosovo and Metohija and Autonomous Province of Vojvodina, respectively, while the Socialist Republic of Serbia was renamed to the Republic of Serbia. The power of the provinces were greatly reduced. Serbia's electoral system was also changed; the delegate system was abolished, Assembly of SR Serbia was renamed to the National Assembly, and the number of seats was decreased to 250. The president of the National Assembly was also the one who would schedule parliamentary and presidential elections.

Serbia also became a multi-party state, meaning that under the Law on Political Organisations, political parties could be registered to take part in future elections. SKS merged with the Socialist Alliance of Working People of Yugoslavia to create the Socialist Party of Serbia, while opposition parties, like the Democratic Party, Serbian Renewal Movement, People's Radical Party, and People's Peasant Party also registered as political parties.
