= List of ambassadors of Serbia to China =

Coordinates: 39.945432°N 116.460735°E

Ambassador of Serbia to China
- Амбасадор Србије у Кини
- Greater coat of arms of Serbia
- Incumbent; Maja Stefanović since 2022
- Ministry of Foreign Affairs
- Style: His Excellency
- Residence: Beijing, China
- Nominator: Government
- Appointer: President of the Republic
- Inaugural holder: Vladimir Popović
- Formation: 1955

The Ambassador of Serbia to China is the official diplomatic representative of the Republic of Serbia to the People's Republic of China. The ambassador leads the Serbian diplomatic mission and is responsible for managing and strengthening the bilateral relations between the two countries. He/she is a non-resident ambassador to North Korea, Mongolia, and Pakistan.

The diplomatic mission was first established in 1955 during the period of the Federal People's Republic of Yugoslavia (later renamed to the Socialist Federal Republic of Yugoslavia). The role has continued through various political transformations, including the Federal Republic of Yugoslavia (later renamed to the State Union of Serbia and Montenegro) and the modern Republic of Serbia.

== List of representatives ==
Diplomatic accreditation	Officeholder	Title	President of Yugoslavia/ Serbia–Montenegro/ Serbia	Premier of China	Term end
Federal People's Republic of Yugoslavia
1955	Vladimir Popović	Ambassador	Josip Broz Tito	Zhou Enlai	1958
1958	Nikola Milićević	Charge d'affaires	Josip Broz Tito	Zhou Enlai	1959
1959	Vlado Šestan	Charge d'affaires	Josip Broz Tito	Zhou Enlai	1963
Socialist Federal Republic of Yugoslavia
1964	Nikola Milićević	Charge d'affaires	Josip Broz Tito	Zhou Enlai	1969
1970	Bogdan Oreščanin	Ambassador	Josip Broz Tito	Zhou Enlai	1973
1973	Milojko Drulović	Ambassador	Josip Broz Tito	Zhou Enlai	1978
1978	Mirko Ostojić	Ambassador	Josip Broz Tito	Hua Guofeng	1981
1982	Sava Obradović	Ambassador	Sergej Kraigher	Zhao Ziyang	1985
1985	Zvone Dragan	Ambassador	Mika Špiljak	Zhao Ziyang	1989
1990	Ilija Đukić	Ambassador	Borisav Jović	Li Peng	1992
Federal Republic of Yugoslavia
1992	Jordan Dinić	Charge d'affaires	Dobrica Ćosić	Li Peng	1995
1995	Slobodan Unković	Ambassador	Zoran Lilić	Li Peng	2001
2001	Ilija Đukić	Ambassador	Vojislav Koštunica	Zhu Rongji	2002
2002	Vladimir Kohut	Charge d'affaires	Vojislav Koštunica	Zhu Rongji	2003
State Union of Serbia and Montenegro
2003	Milisav Pajić	Charge d'affaires	Svetozar Marović	Zhu Rongji	2004
2004	Dragan Momčilović	Ambassador	Svetozar Marović	Wen Jiabao	2006
Republic of Serbia
2006	Miomir Udovički	Ambassador	Boris Tadić	Wen Jiabao	2013
2013	Tatjana Panajotović-Cvetković	Charge d'affaires	Tomislav Nikolić	Li Keqiang	2014
2015	Milan Bačević	Ambassador	Tomislav Nikolić	Li Keqiang	2021
2022	Maja Stefanović	Ambassador	Aleksandar Vučić	Li Keqiang; Li Qiang	

== See also ==
- China–Serbia relations
- Foreign relations of Serbia
