= 1986 Serbian parliamentary election =

- 16 March, 7 April and 21 April 1986
- All 340 seats in the Assembly of SR Serbia; 171 seats needed for a majority
Party	Leader	Seats	+/–
SKS	Ivan Stambolić	323	0
Independents	–	17	0
This lists parties that won seats. See the complete results below.
Prime Minister before	Prime Minister after
Branislav Ikonić; SKS	Desimir Jevtić; SKS

Parliamentary elections were held in Serbia on 16 March, 7 April and 21 April 1986 to elect delegates of the Assembly of SR Serbia. In addition to the parliamentary election, local elections in Serbia and federal elections in the Socialist Federal Republic of Yugoslavia were held in the same year. The election was conducted under an electoral system that was established in the 1974 Yugoslav Constitution. Serbia in 1986 was also a one-party state that was governed by the League of Communists of Serbia (SKS).

The composition of the Assembly did not change in this election; SKS retained its 323 seats and 17 delegates who were not affiliated with SKS also retained their seats in the Assembly. The aftermath of this election marked a turning point in Serbia's history due to the rise of Slobodan Milošević. Ivan Stambolić, who has been the president of the Presidency of the Central Committee since 1984, was succeeded by Milošević, who was his protégé, after the election in May 1986. Milošević would go on to create a faction inside SKS that would be loyal to him and would eventually remove Stambolić and his allies from key positions at the 1987 session of the Central Committee of SKS. In 1988, Milošević started the anti-bureaucratic revolution and began amending the Yugoslav Constitution to revoke the powers of the autonomous status of Vojvodina and Kosovo provinces.

== Background ==
Ivan Stambolić was the head of the League of Communists of Serbia until May 1986

After the World War II, the Communist Party consolidated power in Yugoslavia. Each constituent republic had its own branch of the party, with Serbia having the Communist Party of Serbia, which was renamed to League of Communists of Serbia (SKS) in 1952. Branislav Ikonić was elected prime minister of Serbia in May 1982.

Ivan Stambolić, a liberal within SKS, was elected president of the Presidency of the Central Committee of SKS in April 1984. Stambolić was until then the president of the City Committee of the League of Communists of Belgrade. As his replacement, he promoted his protégé, Slobodan Milošević, to the position, considering that he had long trust in him. This decision was met with criticism from older members of SKS. As the president of the City Committee of the League of Communists of Belgrade, Milošević would go on to create a faction of officials that would be loyal him.

Stambolić announced in January 1986 that he would step down as president of the Presidency of the Central Committee of SKS. 84 municipal committees of SKS nominated Milošević as his successor.

== Electoral system ==
With the adoption of the 1974 Yugoslav Constitution, Serbia's electoral system was changed altogether. Instead of electing members, citizens would elect delegations and workers would also elect their separate delegations. Members of these delegations would then elect delegates that would serve in the Assembly of SR Serbia. The voting system was complex; it combined elements of a direct, indirect, and the first-past-the-post voting majoritarian system.

The Assembly was also divided into three councils. The Council of Associated Labour had 160 delegates while the Council of Municipalities and Socio-Political Council each had 90 delegates. The delegates would then elect members of the Presidency of the Socialist Republic of Serbia, the Council of the Republic, and a member of the Presidency of the Socialist Federal Republic of Yugoslavia (SFRY). In 1986, Serbia also had 186 municipalities.

Although Yugoslavia was a one-party state, by the time of the 1986 elections, regional governments and parties often acted independently. Alex Pravda, a writer on Eastern European politics and an emeritus fellow at the St Antony's College of the University of Oxford, characterised all elections in SFRY as "limited elections", however, political scientist Vladimir Goati noted that this characterisation could be only applied to pre-1974 Yugoslav Constitution elections. Goati characterised the 1974–1986 period as "voting without a choice" (glasanje bez izbora).

=== Election date ===
The election was conducted on three separate days, this being 16 March, 7 April and 21 April 1986. The election had to be held before 15 May 1986, the date when the Federal Chamber of SFRY was constituted.

=== Political parties ===
The table below lists political parties elected in the Assembly of SR Serbia after the 1982 parliamentary election.

Name	Leader	1982 result
Name	Leader	Seats
League of Communists of Serbia	Tihomir Vlaškalić	323 / 340
Independents	–	17 / 340

== Conduct ==
Preparations for the election began in February 1985. The parliamentary election was conducted in the same year as the local elections in Serbia and federal elections in the SFRY. The federal election lasted from 10 March to 10 May 1986. Bogdan Trifunović, the president of the Socialist Alliance of Working People of Serbia, said that "these are the elections for changes, and not for the continuation of a crisis".

By the time of the election, there were 25,050 delegations in total.

== Results ==
In the federal elections, there were 6,565,689 citizens of Serbia who had the right to vote. The composition of the Assembly did not change in this election; SKS retained its 323 seats while the 17 who were not affiliated with SKS retained their seats. In the Council of Associated Labour, 148 SKS delegates were elected, in the Council of Municipalities, 88 SKS delegates were elected, and in the Socio-Political Council 87 SKS delegates were elected. A majority of the elected delegates were 50 years old or younger.

Party	Votes	%	Seats	+/–
League of Communists of Serbia			323	0
Independents			17	0
Total			340	0
Registered voters/turnout	6,565,689	–		
Source: Republic Bureau of Statistics

== Aftermath ==
=== Assembly ===
The Assembly was constituted on 6 May 1986. Ikonić became the president of the Assembly while Miodrag Bogdanović, Olga Nikolić, Miloš Sinđić, Milan Šešlija, and Jan Širka were elected vice-presidents of the Assembly. Out of all 340 delegates, only 23.5 percent of them were women. The Assembly elected Desimir Jevtić as prime minister of Serbia.

=== Rise of Slobodan Milošević ===
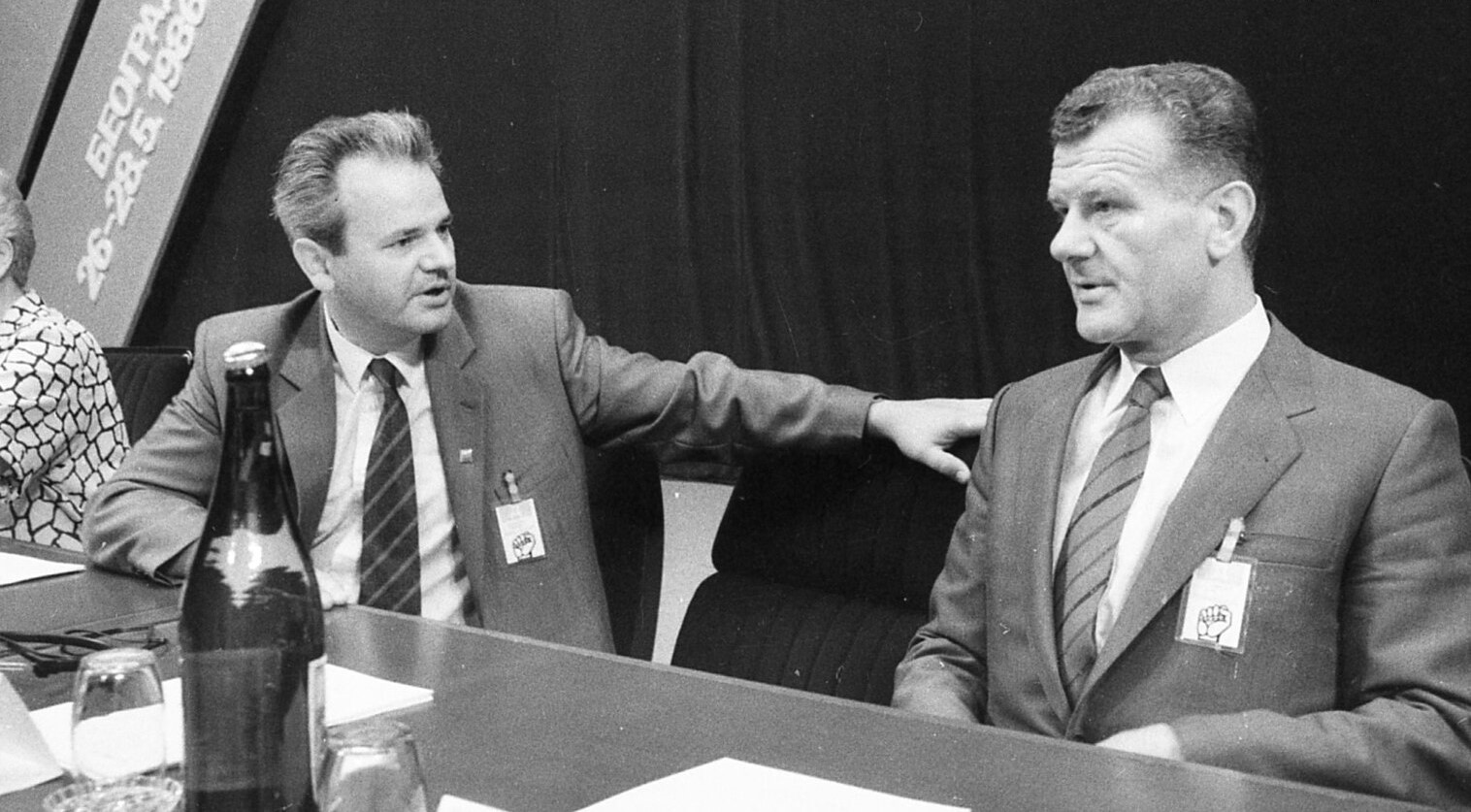
Milošević and Stambolić in May 1986

An election for the president of the Presidency of the Central Committee of SKS was held shortly afterwards the election. Stambolić gave up the role to serve as president of Serbia. Like in 1984, Milošević was again proposed as his successor. Milošević would eventually get elected as the president of the Presidency of the Central Committee of SKS on 28 May 1986, winning 151 out of 157 votes of the Central Committee. Dragiša Pavlović, a liberal and Stambolić's ally, was also elected as the president of the City Committee of the League of Communists of Belgrade.

Although initially ideologically similar, Milošević adopted populist positions and grew to dislike Pavlović and Stambolić, particularly due to their stances on Kosovo. Milošević would eventually call a session of the Central Committee of SKS in September 1987. At the session, several Stambolić's allies, including Pavlović, would get dismissed; this moment eventually ended Stambolić's political career. With Milošević's order, Stambolić would be dismissed from the position of president of Serbia in December 1987 and was instead appointed president of the National Bank of Yugoslavia for international cooperation.

Milošević would start the anti-bureaucratic revolution in 1988 which effectively toppled regional governments in Montenegro, Vojvodina, and Kosovo.

=== Proposed constitutional changes ===
The government of Serbia and Milošević proposed changes to amend the Yugoslav Constitution in 1988. Adopted by the Assembly in March 1989, the amendments revoked the powers that the autonomous provinces of Vojvodina and Kosovo received in the 1974 constitution.
