= Vladislav Jovanović =

Serbian diplomat (1933–2026)

- Владислав Јовановић
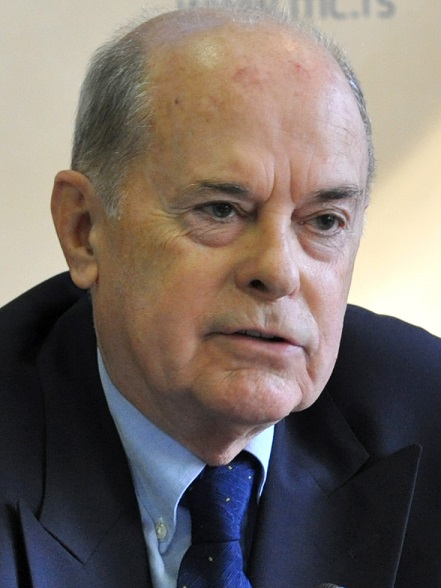
- Jovanović in 2013

Head of the Mission of FR Yugoslavia to the United Nations
- In office 1995–2000
- Succeeded by: Dejan Šahović

Minister of Foreign Affairs of the Federal Republic of Yugoslavia
- In office 4 March 1993 – 15 August 1995
- Preceded by: Ilija Djukic
- Succeeded by: Milan Milutinović
- In office 15 July 1992 – 30 September 1992
- Preceded by: Milivoje Maksić (acting)
- Succeeded by: Ilija Djukic

Minister of Foreign Affairs of Serbia
- In office 30 September 1992 – 4 March 1993
- In office 31 July 1991 – 14 July 1992
- Preceded by: Branko Mikašinović
- Succeeded by: Post abolished

Personal details
- Born: 9 June 1933 Žitni Potok, Morava Banovina, Kingdom of Yugoslavia
- Died: 21 February 2026 (aged 92)
- Party: Socialist Party of Serbia
- Spouse: Mirjana Jovanović
- Education: LLB of Univ. of Belgrade Fac. of Law
- Profession: Diplomat

Vladislav Jovanović (Serbian: Владислав Јовановић; 9 June 1933 – 21 February 2026) was a Serbian diplomat who served as Minister of Foreign Affairs of the Federal Republic of Yugoslavia.

== Education ==
Jovanović was born in Žitni Potok, present-day Serbia, on 9 June 1933, to Milorad Jovanović and Dragica Jovanović (née Petković) both of whom worked as teachers. He completed his high school studies in Belgrade in 1951. Later, he graduated from University of Belgrade Faculty of Law.

== Career ==
Jovanović was a career diplomat with more than 40 years experience. He started his career with the Yugoslav Ministry of Foreign Affairs in 1957. From 1960 to 1964, he worked as an officer at the Yugoslav embassy in Brussels, Belgium. From 1964 to 1967, he worked at the Ministry of Foreign Affairs. From 1967, to 1971, he worked as a Second Secretary at the Yugoslav embassy in Ankara, Turkey. From 1975 to 1979, he was a Counsellor at the Yugoslav embassy in London, United Kingdom. From July 1980 to November 1985, he was the Head of the Directorate for Western Europe at the Ministry of Foreign Affairs. After that, he served as Yugoslav Ambassador to Turkey until 1989. Upon his return, he continued to work for the Ministry of Foreign Affairs of the Federal Republic of Yugoslavia and was appointed to the position of the Minister of Foreign Affairs in March 1993. He remained in that position until August 1995. In September 1995, the government of Slobodan Milošević appointed him as the permanent representative of FR Yugoslavia to the United Nations. Following the overthrow of Slobodan Milošević on 5 October 2000, Jovanović was dismissed from his position position. He returned to Belgrade and retired from active diplomatic service.

In February 2005, Jovanović took the stand at the trial of Slobodan Milošević at the Hague Tribunal, testifying for the defence.

In his later years, Jovanović made public statements in which he criticized Western governments for their politics towards Serbia. Commenting on the incidents in North Kosovo in 2011, Jovanović said, 'It should be clear to the West that their policy of arrogantly ignoring Serbian interests will not hold Serbia by their side.' Similarly, in an interview in September 2011, he stated that regarding Kosovo, Serbia had not yet played its strongest cart - to cease the process of approaching Euro-Atlantic integrations. He added that Serbia should have done that 'a long time ago', and that it was 'still not too late to do so'.

== Death ==
Jovanović died on 21 February 2026, at the age of 92.

Government offices
Preceded by Milivoje Maksić (Acting)	Minister of Foreign Affairs; 1992–1992	Succeeded by Ilija Djukic
Preceded by Ilija Djukic	Minister of Foreign Affairs; 1993–1995	Succeeded by Milan Milutinović
