= Zoran Sokolović (politician) =

Serbian politician

Zoran Sokolović (Serbian Cyrillic: Зоран Соколовић; 1 January 1938 – 6 February 2001) was a prominent Serbian politician in the 1980s and 1990s. He was Secretary of the Presidency of the League of Communists of Serbia (SKS) from 1986 to 1989 and President of the National Assembly of Serbia from 1989 to 1990. A founding member of the Socialist Party of Serbia (SPS) in 1990, Sokolović later served as Serbian minister of the interior from 1991 to 1997 and as minister of the interior of FR Yugoslavia from 1997 to 2000.

Sokolović was for many years one of Slobodan Milošević's closest allies and played a prominent role in facilitating Milošević's rise to power.

== Early life and private career ==
Sokolović was born and raised in the village of Lepena near Knjaževac. At the time of his birth, the community was part of the Morava Banovina of the Kingdom of Yugoslavia; after World War II, it was part of the People's Republic of Serbia in the Federal People's Republic of Yugoslavia. Sokolović graduated from the University of Belgrade Faculty of Agriculture and worked afterward as production superintendent at the Vučje Agricultural Cooperative, becoming the cooperative's director in 1964.

== Politician ==
=== League of Communists of Serbia ===
Sokolović became a member of the League of Communists in 1960. He was elected to the Organizational and Political Council of the Serbian parliament in the 1969 Serbian parliamentary election and presumably served for the full term that followed, from 1969 to 1974. He was also secretary of the municipal committee of the League of Communists in Knjaževac during this period.

By 1981, Sokolović had become a member of the Central Committee of the League of Communists of Serbia. He was re-elected to the Central Committee in the May 1982 party elections, and in June 1984 he was elected as a member of the Central Committee's presidency.

==== Secretary of the SKS Presidency (1986–89) ====
Slobodan Milošević was elected unanimously as president of the Central Committee's presidency in the May 1986 party elections, and Sokolović was elected unanimously as secretary of the presidency. In an interview from this period, Sokolović stressed the need for ideological unity in the League of Communists, noting that "civil liberal" and "ultra-left" threats had both been growing in recent times. In July 1986, he was given further responsibilities as head of the SKS's committee for personnel policy. In December of that year, Sokolović criticized what he described as a "political blockade" on funding for development in Kosovo and urged the assemblies of Serbia, Vojvodina, and Kosovo to reach agreement on this matter. The Serbian media noted that this was usually direct criticism by the standards of the time.

Sokolović delivered a speech on the situation in Kosovo at a July 1987 meeting of the Central Committee. He said that the emigration of Serbs and Montenegrins was "the most serious political consequence of the overall situation in the province," and added that if the emigration was not stopped, "the goal of the counter-revolution would be achieved - an ethnically pure Kosovo." In keeping with SKS policy, he condemned both Albanian nationalism and Serbian nationalism in his speech. The following month, he delivered a speech in front of a hostile crowd in Kosovo Polje, where members of the predominantly Kosovo Serb audience interrupted him and accused Serbia's political leadership of ignoring their interests.

Sokolović played a prominent role in facilitating Milošević's victory over Ivan Stambolić at the Central Committee meeting of 23–24 September 1987, which brought about Stambolić's political downfall and was a major event in Milošević's consolidation of power. He later took part in a media campaign that fabricated numerous "telegrams of support" for Milošević and increased the latter's stature across Serbia.

Milošević and Sokolović were both unanimously re-elected to their respective roles on the SKS presidency in May 1988. In a speech to the presidency in July 1988, Sokolović identified "Albanian nationalism and separatism" as the "main causes of the counter-revolution" in Kosovo.

Sokolović was subsequently a leading participant in the supposed "anti-bureaucratic revolution," by which Milošević further consolidated his control over Serbian political life. He was present for the October 1988 "yoghurt revolution" in Vojvodina, welcoming the resignations of the former provincial leadership (which had been opposed to Milošević) and saying that the new leadership would take a more appropriate line on Kosovo. At a joint meeting of the SKS and League of Communists of Yugoslavia (SKJ) presidencies later in the month, he called for Kolj Široka, Azem Vllasi, and Svetislav Dolašević, all of whom were leading members of the League of Communists of Kosovo (SKK), to be expelled from the SKJ Central Committee; this prompted a hostile response from both Vllasi and Croatian SKJ delegate Stipe Šuvar. In November 1988, Sokolović was present at the SKK meeting in which Vllasi and Kaqusha Jashari announced their resignations, under pressure from Milošević and his allies.

The Socialist Alliance of Working People (SSRN) of Serbia nominated Sokolović as a candidate for Serbia's seat on the Presidency of Yugoslavia in February 1989. He declined the nomination. Borisav Jović was elected for the role.

==== President of the Serbian parliament (1989–90) ====
In early April 1989, Sokolović was nominated as one of three candidates in a by-election to fill two recently vacated seats in the SKS's delegation to the Social-Political Council of the Serbian parliament. At the same time, the SSRN nominated Slobodan Milošević to become President of the Presidency of the Socialist Republic of Serbia and Sokolović to succeed Jović as president of the full Serbian parliament, comprising its three constituent councils (i.e., the Social-Political Council, the Council of Associated Labour, and the Council of Municipalities).

Not surprisingly under these circumstances, Sokolović was one of the successful candidates in the by-election. On 8 May 1989, he was elected as assembly president in a meeting of the full parliament, receiving 216 votes as against fifty-five for Božidar Manić and twenty-one for Miodrag Veljković. At the same parliamentary session, Milošević was elected as president of the Serbian presidency. Sokolović stood down as secretary of the SKS presidency at this time and was replaced by Milomir Minić. In June 1989, he received additional responsibilities as chair of the assembly committee for constitutional affairs.

Sokolović delivered a speech in July 1989 supporting the Serbian SSRN's initiative for more competitive elections, to be held by secret ballot with multiple candidates for the same positions. In October of the same year, during the buildup to the 1989 Serbian general election, the SSRN brought forward a list of 108 candidates to fill ninety positions on the Social-Political Council. Sokolović was nominated as one of twenty candidates for sixteen available positions on the SKS's delegation to the council and was subsequently re-elected. When the new Serbian assembly held its constitutive session on 5 December 1989, Milošević was re-elected as president of the Serbian presidency, and Sokolović was re-elected as president of the full parliament, this time receiving 245 votes as against sixty-three for his only opponent, Radivoje Marinković. Later in the same month, Sokolović was also re-elected to another term on the SKS Central Committee.

Sokolović led the assembly in voting to suspend the work of Kosovo's assembly and executive council on 5 July 1990. After this time, most members of Kosovo's majority Albanian community began a boycott of Serbian state institutions.

=== Socialist Party of Serbia ===
==== Last months as president of the Serbian parliament (1990) ====
Serbia transitioned from a one-party socialist republic to a (nominally) multi-party democracy in 1990. On 17 June 1990, the SKS merged with the Serbian SSRN to create the Socialist Party of Serbia. Sokolović was a founding member of the new party and was elected to its inaugural main board.

On 26 July 1990, Sokolović presided over the assembly as it approved a new draft republican constitution that established a sovereign and united Serbian state, reducing the autonomy previously granted to the provinces of Vojvodina and Kosovo. He defended the document as establishing the proper legal foundations for the state and as guaranteeing the equality of all citizens. He subsequently promoted the draft constitution at a series of public meetings ("consultations") throughout the country. In September 1990, he met with representatives of Serbia's newly formed opposition parties to discuss the new constitution. Several opposition leaders later expressed their dissatisfaction with the meeting, with Vojislav Koštunica of the Democratic Party (DS) saying that Sokolović had responded to their proposals with ultimatums.

The final version of the constitution was approved by parliament and became law on 28 September 1990. On the same day, Sokolović announced that Serbia's first general election under the new constitution would take place on 9 December. Under the constitution, Serbia had a unicameral parliament whose 250 members were elected for individual constituencies over two rounds of voting.

Sokolović ran as the SPS's candidate for the Kosovo constituency of Leposavić, Titova Mitrovica, and Podujevo in the 1990 election. During the campaign, he called on Kosovo Albanians to reject what he described as the "blinded nationalist movement led by the separatists and their allies" and participate in the vote; mostly, however, this did not happen. He was elected in the first round for his constituency, which was predominantly Serb, with over seventy per cent support.

==== SPS parliamentary leader (1991) ====
The SPS won a landslide victory overall in the 1990 parliamentary election with 194 out of 250 seats; in the concurrent presidential vote, Slobodan Milošević was elected as Serbian president. Sokolović took his seat when the new assembly convened in January 1991. It was rumoured that he would be appointed as minister of the interior in Dragutin Zelenović's cabinet, but this did not initially happen. Instead, he was chosen as leader of the SPS's parliamentary group.

In one assembly speech from this period, Sokolović described the Belgrade street violence of 9 March 1991 as "a consequence of destructive demonstrations" that had threatened Serbia's democracy and institutions.

Sokolović stood down as SPS parliamentary leader in early June 1991, after he was appointed to cabinet. He continued to serve as a member of parliament.

==== Serbian minister of the interior (1991–97) ====
===== 1991–93 parliament =====
Sokolović was appointed as Serbia's minister of the interior on 30 May 1991, succeeding Radmilo Bogdanović, who resigned following criticism of his handling of the 9 March demonstrations. This was a particularly inauspicious moment in Serbian history. At the time Sokolović joined the cabinet, the breakup of the Socialist Federal Republic of Yugoslavia was reaching a critical point, the Yugoslav Wars of the 1990s were about to begin, and self-styled Chetnik formations were organizing in Serbia. Milošević's rule was increasingly becoming recognized as authoritarian in nature, and large-scale boycotts of Serbian state institutions were taking place in both Kosovo and the Sandžak. In addition, crime levels were rising and organized crime was becoming increasingly powerful in the country.

In late June 1991, Sokolović delivered a speech to the Serbian parliament on recent developments in Croatia following its declaration of independence from Yugoslavia. As Sokolović described these events, there were some deaths in clashes between Serbs and Croatian police in predominantly Serb communities such as Glina and Bršadin, but in most such places “the situation [was] under the control" of Yugoslav People's Army (JNA) units.

The self-styled Republic of Serbian Krajina (RSK) subsequently emerged as the de facto governing authority of Croatia's predominantly Serb areas for the duration of the Croatian War. Although the Serbian government broadly supported the RSK, its relations with the territory's leadership were often difficult. In March 1992, Serbian police dismantled the RSK's information bureau in Belgrade, reportedly on orders from Sokolović.

In April 1992, Sokolović was asked in parliament how many Serbian citizens had fled the country because of the conflict in Croatia. He responded that the ministry did not keep such records "because all citizens [could] exercise their right to leave the country and return whenever they wanted." He also said that "the Serbian border was completely free at all times."

The Socialist Federal Republic of Yugoslavia officially ceased to exist on 27 April 1992 and was succeeded, in a sense, by the Federal Republic of Yugoslavia (FRY), comprising the republics of Serbia and Montenegro. Not long after the FRY was constituted, Sokolović's republican police took control of the federal police headquarters on Kneza Miloša Street in Belgrade. He argued that the matter was a "banal property dispute" and not a political issue. Federal interior minister Pavle Bulatović took a different position, describing the takeover of the building as a "violent intrusion, not to say occupation, invasion, conquest." Rumours circulated that the republican police actually took over the building to ensure the Serbian government would gain possession of sensitive war documents. Following negotiations, the federal ministry withdrew its claims to the building, and the two ministries reached an agreement on their respective roles and functions on 6 November 1992.

On 22 October 1992, sixteen ethnically Bosniak citizens from the village of Sjeverin in the Serbian municipality of Priboj were kidnapped by paramilitary forces under the command of Milan Lukić and taken to Višegrad, in the part of Bosnia and Herzegovina controlled by the Republika Srpska, where they were tortured and executed. Before the ultimate fate of the victims was known, Sokolović described the kidnapping as a "heinous act" and called for the Republika Srpska authorities to ensure their safe release. He also announced that two individuals had been arrested; he did not provide their names, but it later became known that one of those arrested was Lukić. Both were subsequently released after nine days by the order of a local court. In June 1993, the newspaper Borba (which was then aligned with the Serbian opposition) noted that the interior ministry's criminal report against Lukić and his co-accused only referred to illegal weapons possession and had not mentioned the kidnapping.

===== 1993–94 parliament =====
Serbia adopted a system of proportional representation prior to the 1992 Serbian parliamentary election; under the new electoral system, one-third of assembly mandates were assigned to candidates on successful electoral lists in numerical order, with the remaining two-thirds assigned to other candidates on the lists at the discretion of the sponsoring parties or coalitions. Sokolović appeared in the lead position on the Socialist Party's list for the Niš constituency and was re-elected when the list won eleven out of twenty-four seats. During the election, he urged Serbian voters to not "be deceived by recommendations coming from the outside world to vote for those who will neglect the vital interests of the Serbian people," saying that "the only sin of the Serbian leadership [...] is that it has fraternally helped the Serbian people in the Krajina." The Socialist Party won the election overall but fell short of a majority and initially governed with unofficial support from the far-right Serbian Radical Party (SRS). Sokolović took his seat when the new assembly convened in January 1993.

Sokolović was retained as minister of the interior in Nikola Šainović's administration, which took office in February 1993. A newspaper report from the period described him as Milošević's "trusted man" in cabinet. Shortly after his re-appointment, he announced that Serbian police had undertaken successful crackdowns on burglaries, car thefts, contraband weapons, and the smuggling of drugs and foreign currency. He took credit for preventing conflict in ethnically mixed areas, particularly in Kosovo, and argued that Serbia should avoid "being drawn into direct military conflicts" in the ongoing wars in Croatia and Bosnia. His claim to have stopped "the wave of violence in Serbia" later became the subject of mockery, given the broader social breakdown that continued over the year that followed.

On 27 February 1993, members of Milan Lukić's paramilitary unit kidnapped eighteen ethnic Bosniaks, one ethnic Croat, and one other person of unknown origin from a Belgrade–Bar train when it briefly crossed from Serbia into Bosnian territory. As with the previous kidnapping, the victims were later tortured and murdered, an incident that became known as the Štrpci massacre. Several of the victims were from Prijepolje, and the incident contributed to a rise in tensions between Serbs and Bosniaks in the municipality. Sokolović was one of a number of Serbian officials who travelled to Prijepolje on multiple occasions in an attempt to calm the situation. The Serbian police subsequently detained Lukić on an unrelated matter; he served eight months in prison but was ultimately not tried for the kidnapping or the murders.

Evidence later emerged that some high-ranking Serbian and Yugoslavian officials were complicit in the massacre, at least to the extent of having advance knowledge of the kidnapping and failing to prevent it. There have long been suspicions of broader collusion between Lukić's paramilitary group and Serbian authorities, and some family members of the victims have alleged that the Štrpci incident was carried out with the complicity of Serbian police and with Sokolović's knowledge. As against this, it was also reported that Sokolović told Milošević at an open forum in Prijepolje that Serbian police had "to speak plainly [...] kidnapped" Lukić after the Štrpci incident in order to detain him in Serbia.

In June 1993, Serbian Renewal Movement (SPO) leader Vuk Drašković, his wife Danica, and several others were arrested, beaten, and sent to a high-security prison following street protests in Belgrade that had prompted a strong police response. Sokolović sought to defend the actions of Serbian police in the matter, saying that they "did everything according to the law." The SPO responded by calling for Sokolović to be dismissed from office due to "the brutal police attack on the people." International pressure ultimately brought about Drašković and his wife's release from prison. In August 1993, a lawyer for Drašković brought criminal charges against Sokolović and other Serbian officials.

On 12 October 1993, Serbian police seriously injured a Serbian actress in an incident that occurred while she was standing in line to buy flour. Sokolović personally apologized to the woman for the incident but rejected further calls for his resignation. As a result of this controversy, the SPO members of parliament said they would support a motion of non-confidence in the government that had been initiated by the Radicals, who by this time had withdrawn their support for the SPS administration. Faced with the real prospect of defeat, Milošević moved to dissolve parliament, and a new election was scheduled for December.

===== 1994–97 parliament =====
Sokolović appeared in the second position on the Socialist Party's list for the Niš division in the 1993 Serbian parliamentary election and was re-elected when the list won twelve seats. The Socialists won 123 out of 250 seats overall and subsequently gained a parliamentary majority through an alliance with the small New Democracy (ND) party. In February 1994, Sokolović was chosen as one of the Serbian parliament's twenty delegates to the Chamber of Republics, the upper house of the Yugoslavian parliament.

A new ministry took office under Mirko Marjanović in March 1994, and Sokolović once again continued to serve as interior minister. Opposition parliamentarians in this period accused him of both overspending and allowing high-level corruption in the ministry.

In July 1994, opposition politicians accused Sokolović of using special forces units to quell a disturbance in the Serbian parliament. He denied the charge, saying that only the regular security forces of parliament had been involved. In response to this, SPO parliamentarian Ivan Kovačević said from the assembly rostrum, "Zoran Sokolović is the biggest liar, because he said that there were no special forces in the hall, and I personally saw two special forces vans."

Sokolović was re-elected to the main board of the SPS in March 1996.

During the 1996–1997 Serbian protests, Sokolović held a meeting with opposition student leaders that was described as having been very unproductive. In response to the students' questions, Sokolović repeatedly said that the police were acting in accordance with the law, adding that he had no information on reports of demonstrators being beaten by plainclothes police on 26 December 1996.

According to inside accounts, Sokolović was not particularly happy while serving as republican interior minister and sometimes made little effort to conceal this fact. A Borba article from March 1994 noted that "those in the know" considered Sokolović as mostly providing cover for Radmilo Bogdanović and Mihalj Kertes, the real political overseers of the Serbian police. In the same year, a whistleblower told B92 that various forces in the interior ministry were responsible for coordinating much of Serbia's organized crime racketeering, though he added that Sokolović himself knew very little about these matters. In January 1997, Vreme noted that Sokolović's deputy ministers, Radovan Stojičić Badža and Jovica Stanišić, were much better informed about actual conditions in the ministry. After Sokolović's death, another article in Vreme noted that his real responsibilities as a republican minister were to ensure Milošević's general control over the Serbian police and justify the department's budget once a year in parliament.

==== Yugoslavian minister of the interior (1997–2000) ====
With the end of his term as Serbian president rapidly approaching, Slobodan Milošević organized a tacit campaign to succeed Zoran Lilić as Yugoslavian president in 1997. In anticipation of making this shift, he arranged for Sokolović to be appointed as Yugoslavian minister of the interior on 21 March 1997. Milošević was, in turn, later elected as president by the federal parliament and was sworn in to his new office on 23 July 1997.

Not long after his appointment as a federal minister, Sokolović said that Yugoslavia would not extradite any of its citizens to face charges of war crimes, on the grounds that the federation's constitution provided for all citizens facing criminal charges to be tried domestically. He protested the arrest of Slavko Dokmanović by forces of the International Criminal Tribunal for the former Yugoslavia (ICTY) in late June 1997 and said that, because of this action, Yugoslavia would not cooperate further with the tribunal.

The Socialist Party of Serbia contested the 1997 Serbian parliamentary election in an alliance with the Yugoslav Left (JUL) and New Democracy. Sokolović appeared in the lead position on the alliance's electoral list for the smaller, redistributed division of Zaječar and was re-elected to the republican assembly when the list won four out of nine seats. The Socialist Party's alliance won 110 seats overall, and the SPS and JUL subsequently formed a new coalition government with the Radical Party. Sokolović's term in the federal Chamber of Republics ended in February 1998, when the Serbian parliament elected a new delegation.

In early 1998, Sokolović said in a radio interview that "separatist aspirations in Kosovo-Metohija had escalated over the past two years and were slowly assuming the proportions of the worst form of terrorism." He added that some ethnic Albanians in the province were being murdered solely for the crime of "thinking differently from the separatists" and that terrorism in the province would need to be "resolutely stamped out." Such comments notwithstanding, Sokolović does not appear to have been a prominent actor in the events of the 1998–99 Kosovo War or the 1999 NATO bombing of Yugoslavia. A Human Rights Watch report from 2001 includes the observation that "all evidence suggests that he and the federal ministry had a limited role" in coordinating police activities in these matters.

Although Sokolović was again re-elected to the Socialist Party's main board in February 2000, in practice he was politically marginalized by this time. A July 2000 report in Vreme described him as "already forgotten" within the federal ministry. It was later suggested that Milošević had planned to revitalize the somewhat dormant federal police force in 1997 as part of his campaign against Montenegrin president Milo Đukanović, but this plan never came to fruition, and Sokolović was accordingly left with little to do in his portfolio.

Slobodan Milošević was defeated in the 2000 Yugoslavian presidential election and fell from power on 5 October 2000, a watershed moment in Serbian and Yugoslavian politics. Sokolović's term as a federal cabinet minister ended on 4 November 2000. He was not a candidate in the subsequent 2000 Serbian parliamentary election, and his final term in the national assembly ended in January 2001.

== Death ==
On 6 February 2001, Sokolović was found dead of a gunshot wound in his car, which was parked in his family orchard in his home village of Lepena. His death was ruled a suicide; some newspapers reported that he had been suffering from a serious illness, although his autopsy did not provide confirmation of this claim. A subsequent article in Vreme, while noting that Sokolović did not seem to bear personal responsibility for the worst actions of Serbia's interior ministry during his time as minister, nonetheless blamed him for creating "the eastern Serbian mafia structure that ruled over Serbia for a full thirteen years."

== Electoral record ==
=== National Assembly of Serbia ===
1990 Serbian parliamentary election: Leposavić, Titova Mitrovica, and Podujevo
Candidate	Party	Votes	%
Zoran Sokolović (incumbent)	Socialist Party of Serbia		72.10
Zorica Blagojević	Citizens' Group		defeated
Boško Budimirović	Serbian Renewal Movement		defeated
Stanimir Jasnić	Citizens' Group		defeated
Dr. Milovan Sekulić	Citizens' Group		defeated
Total			
Source: All candidates except Sokolović are listed alphabetically.

=== Assembly of the Socialist Republic of Serbia ===
April–May 1989 Serbian parliamentary by-election (Social-Political Council): League of Communists of Serbia delegation (two members elected)
Candidate	Party	Votes	%
Biljana Reljić	League of Communists of Serbia (Socialist Alliance of Working People endorsement)		elected
Zoran Sokolović	League of Communists of Serbia (Socialist Alliance of Working People endorsement)		elected
Gradimir Stefanović	League of Communists of Serbia (Socialist Alliance of Working People endorsement)		defeated
Total			

1969 Serbian parliamentary election (Organizational and Political Council): Zaječar
Candidate	Party	Votes	%
Zoran Sokolović	League of Communists of Serbia (Socialist Alliance of Working People endorsement)		elected
Petar Pešić	Socialist Alliance of Working People endorsement		defeated
Total			
