= Maksić =

Maksić (Serbian: Максић) is a Serbian surname. Notable people with the surname include:

- Dejan Maksić (born 1975), Serbian footballer
- Milivoje Maksić (1928–2003), Yugoslav diplomat, politician, and author
- Nenad Maksić (born 1972), Serbian handball coach and player
