= Mihály Kertész =

Mihály Kertész may refer to:

- Michael Curtiz, film director
- Mihalj Kertes, Serbian politician
