= Cabinet of Desimir Jevtić =

Governing body of Serbia

- 16th Cabinet of Socialist Serbia
- 1986–1989
- Emblem of Socialist Serbia
- Date formed: May 6, 1986
- Date dissolved: December 5, 1989

People and organisations
- Head of state: Ivan Stambolić; Petar Gračanin; Slobodan Milošević
- Head of government: Desimir Jevtić
- Member parties: League of Communists of Serbia

History
- Predecessor: Cabinet of Branislav Ikonić
- Successor: Cabinet of Stanko Radmilović

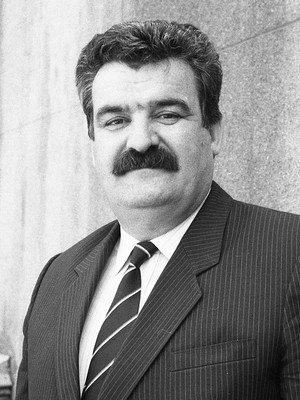
Desimir Jevtić

Cabinet of Desimir Jevtić was the governing body of Serbia from 1986 to 1989, whose official title was Executive Council of the Assembly of the Socialist Republic of Serbia. It was formed on May 6, 1986 and dissolved on December 5, 1989, due to disagreements between the Prime Minister Desimir Jevtić and the Serbian President Slobodan Milošević.

== Cabinet members ==
Position	Portfolio	Name	In Office
Prime Minister	General Affairs	Desimir Jevtić	May 6, 1986 - Dec 5, 1989
Deputy Prime Minister	General Affairs	Ratko Butulija	May 6, 1986 - Dec 5, 1989
Deputy Prime Minister	General Affairs	Radenko Žunić	May 6, 1986 - Dec 5, 1989
Deputy Prime Minister	General Affairs	Milutin Milošević	May 6, 1986 - Dec 5, 1989
Deputy Prime Minister	General Affairs	Filip Grujić	May 6, 1986 - Dec 5, 1989
Cabinet Members by Position
Republican Secretary	Internal Affairs	Svetomir Lalović	May 6, 1986 - Dec 5, 1989
Republican Secretary	People's Defence	Milorad Škrbić	May 6, 1986 - Dec 5, 1989
Republican Secretary	Justice and General Management	Dragan Šaponjić	May 6, 1986 - Dec 5, 1989
Republican Secretary	Finance	Miroslav Đorđević	May 6, 1986 - Dec 5, 1989
President of Republican Committee	Relations with Abroad	Božo Jovanović	May 6, 1986 - Dec 5, 1989
President of Republican Committee	Energy, Industry and Construction	Rade Čolić	May 6, 1986 - Dec 5, 1989
President of Republican Committee	Transportation and Connections	Đorđe Matić	May 6, 1986 - July 6, 1989
President of Republican Committee	Transportation and Connections	Branko Šalipur	July 6, 1989 - Dec 5, 1989
President of Republican Committee	Agriculture and Forestry	Žarko Sekulić	May 6, 1986 - Dec 5, 1989
President of Republican Committee	Trade and Services	Luka Mačkić	May 6, 1986 - Dec 5, 1989
President of Republican Committee	Urbanism, Housing and Communal Affairs	Ljubica Bujanić	May 6, 1986 - Dec 5, 1989
President of Republican Committee	Education and Physical Activity	Milomir Petrović	May 6, 1986 - Dec 5, 1989
President of Republican Committee	Culture	Branislav Milošević	May 6, 1986 - Dec 5, 1989
President of Republican Committee	Science and Informatics	Petar Pravica	May 6, 1986 - Dec 5, 1989
President of Republican Committee	Information	Živorad Đorđević	May 6, 1986 - Dec 5, 1989
President of Republican Committee	Health and Social Policy	Dragiša Filimonović	May 6, 1986 - Dec 5, 1989
President of Republican Committee	Veteran and Disability Policy	Jovo Mišković	May 6, 1986 - Dec 5, 1989
President of Republican Committee	Legislation	Koviljka Romanić	May 6, 1986 - Dec 5, 1989
President of Republican Committee	Water Management and Water Supply	Ratko Vujanović	May 6, 1986 - Dec 5, 1989
Director of Republican Bureau for Social Planning		Mihajlo Crnobranja	May 6, 1986 - Dec 5, 1989
President of Board for Relations With Religious Communities		Dragan Dragojlović	May 6, 1986 - Dec 5, 1989
Cabinet Members Elected by the Parliament
Petar Bojić			May 6, 1986 - Dec 5, 1989
Krcun Dragović			May 6, 1986 - Dec 5, 1989
Dušan Jovanović			May 6, 1986 - Dec 5, 1989
Ljubisav Lilić			May 6, 1986 - Dec 5, 1989
Dragutin Marković			May 6, 1986 - Dec 5, 1989
Dragoljub Mitić			May 6, 1986 - Dec 5, 1989
Dragoslav Nikolić			May 6, 1986 - Dec 5, 1989
Milisav Parezanović			May 6, 1986 - Dec 5, 1989
Milutin Petrović			May 6, 1986 - Dec 5, 1989
Radoslav Radović			May 6, 1986 - Dec 5, 1989
Branko Šalipur			May 6, 1986 - Dec 5, 1989
Jovan Zebić			May 6, 1986 - Dec 5, 1989
Dušan Višnjić			May 6, 1986 - Dec 5, 1989
Fadilj Mumini			May 6, 1986 - Dec 5, 1989
Dragoljub Ćosić			May 6, 1986 - Dec 5, 1989
Ljubisav lilić			May 6, 1986 - Dec 5, 1989

== See also ==
- Socialist Republic of Serbia
- Cabinet of Serbia
- League of Communists of Serbia
