= Živadin Jovanović =

Serbian diplomat and politician

Živadin Jovanović Живадин Јовановић
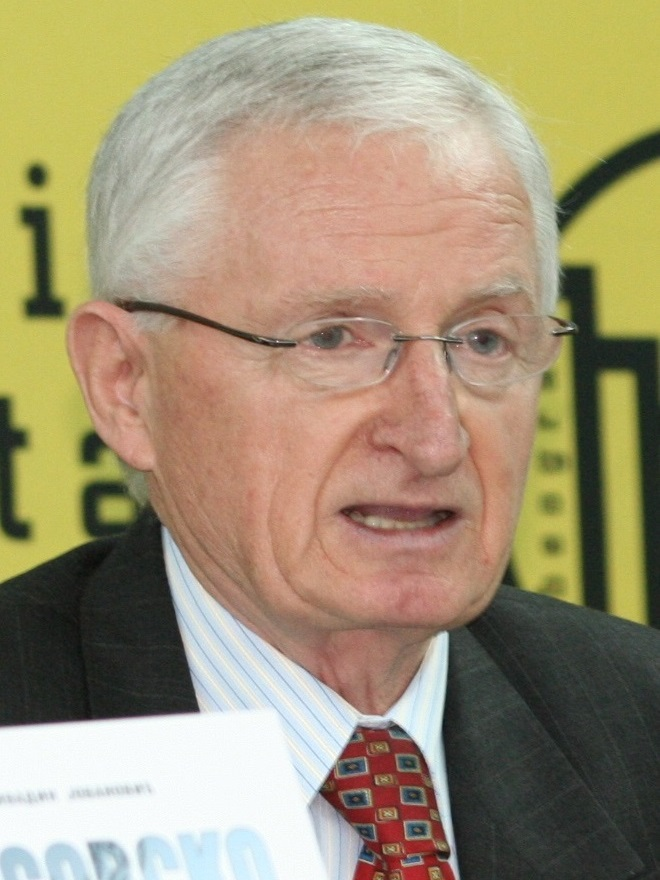
- Jovanović in 2007

Minister of Foreign Affairs of Yugoslavia
- In office 9 January 1998 – 4 November 2000
- Preceded by: Milan Milutinović
- Succeeded by: Goran Svilanović

Personal details
- Born: 14 November 1938 (age 87) Oparić, Yugoslavia (now Oparić, Serbia)
- Party: Socialist Party of Serbia
- Education: University of Belgrade Faculty of Law

Živadin Jovanović (Serbian: Живадин Јовановић; born 14 November 1938), is a Serbian diplomat and politician, who served as the Minister of Foreign Affairs of the Federal Republic of Yugoslavia between 1998 and 2000.

== Career ==
Jovanović completed High School in Jagodina, Yugoslavia in 1957, in what is now Serbia. He graduated from the University of Belgrade's Law School in 1961.

Jovanović served as Legal Officer in the Municipal Assembly of New Belgrade from 1961 to 1964. He has been in the diplomatic service since 1964. First he served as Yugoslav Vice Consul in Toronto, Canada between 1966 and 1970, Adviser in the Yugoslav Embassy in Kenya between 1974 and 1978 and finally as the Yugoslav Ambassador to Angola between 1988 and 1993. Yugoslavia broke up in the early 1990s and he was not recalled, rather continued in the same capacity for the new Federal Republic of Yugoslavia formed by Serbia and Montenegro.

From 1994 to 1997, Jovanović was Assistant Federal Minister for Foreign Affairs, and subsequently Federal Minister of Foreign Affairs from 1998 to 2000. He was the Vice-President for Foreign Affairs of the Socialist Party of Serbia between 1996 and 2002 and also served as a Member of Parliament of the Republic of Serbia from 1996.

During the Kosovo War in May 1999, former Irish President Mary Robinson (then the UN's High Commissioner for Human Rights) met Jovanović to challenge him over evidence the Serbian government was violently expelling ethnic Albanians from Kosovo. The Los Angeles Times reported that about 1.8 million Albanians were believed to have fled from Kosovo, but Jovanović denied the claims. He asked Robinson to condemn the NATO bombing which he said had killed about 1,200 civilians. To Robinson's irritation, President Slobodan Milošević failed to join their meeting. Following the overthrow of Milošević on 5 October 2000, Jovanović resigned from the position of Foreign Minister on 14 October.

Since 2005, he has served as the President of the Belgrade Forum for a World of Equals. The forum is a nonprofit organization and a member of the World Peace Council. On its website, the Forum advocates non-interventionism and opposes "humanitarian wars".

Jovanović speaks English, Russian, French and Portuguese.

== Bibliography ==
- Ukidanje države (Abolishing the State), Dijam-m-pres, Veternik, 2003
- Kosovsko ogledalo (The Kosovo Mirror), Belgrade Forum for a World of Equals, 2006

Government offices
Preceded by Milan Milutinović	Minister of Foreign Affairs; 1998 – 2000	Succeeded by Goran Svilanović
