= Cabinet of Stanko Radmilović =

Last cabinet of the Socialist Republic of Serbia

- 17th Cabinet of Socialist Serbia
- 1989–1991
- Emblem of Socialist Republic of Serbia
- Date formed: December 5, 1989
- Date dissolved: February 11, 1991

People and organisations
- Head of state: Slobodan Milošević
- Head of government: Stanko Radmilović
- Member parties: League of Communists of Serbia

History
- Predecessor: Cabinet of Desimir Jevtić
- Successor: Cabinet of Dragutin Zelenović

Cabinet of Stanko Radmilović was the last cabinet of the Socialist Republic of Serbia, whose official title was Executive Council of the Assembly of the Socialist Republic of Serbia. It was formed on December 5, 1989, and dissolved on February 11, 1991.

During this cabinet's term, the League of Communists of Yugoslavia was dissolved, and soon after the first multi-party election took place in all the republics of the Socialist Federative Republic of Yugoslavia. On September 28, this cabinet adopted a new constitution which dropped the prefix "Socialist" from Serbia's official name, and called for the first multi-party general elections, which took place on December 9, 1990.

The Cabinet of Stanko Radmilović was dissolved after the Socialist Party of Serbia won an absolute majority on the parliamentary elections, and formed a new cabinet, with Dragutin Zelenović as the Prime Minister.

== Cabinet members ==
Position	Portfolio	Name
Prime Minister	General Affairs	Stanko Radmilović
Deputy Prime Minister	General Affairs	Miroslav Mišković
Deputy Prime Minister	General Affairs	Filip Grujić
Deputy Prime Minister	General Affairs	Živadin Stefanović
Deputy Prime Minister	General Affairs	Dušan Mihajlović
Deputy Prime Minister	General Affairs	Momčilo Trajković
Cabinet Members by Position
Republican Secretary	Internal Affairs	Radmilo Bogdanović
Republican Secretary	People's Defence	Miodrag Jokić
Republican Secretary	Relations with Abroad	Aleksandar Prlja
Republican Secretary	Finance	Jovan Zebić
Republican Secretary	Industry, Energy and Construction	Nikola Šainović
Republican Secretary	Trade, Tourism and Catering	Petrašin Petrašinović
Republican Secretary	Justice and General Management	Sreten Vladisavljević
Republican Secretary	Agriculture and Forestry	Veljko Simin
Republican Secretary	Transportation and Connections	Kostadin Božić
Republican Secretary	Labor	Stojka Đorđević
Republican Secretary	Urbanism, Housing and Communal Affairs	Boško Marković
Republican Secretary	Education, Science and Physical Activity	Danilo Marković
Republican Secretary	Health, Social and Child Protection	Vladimir Petronić
Republican Secretary	Social Environmental Protection and Improvement	Pavle Todorović
Republican Secretary	Veteran and Disability Policy	Andrija Merenik
Republican Secretary	Culture	Milan Ranković
Cabinet Members Elected by the Parliament
Dragomir Petković
Dragan Nikolić
Đorđe Rošić

== See also ==
- Socialist Republic of Serbia
- Cabinet of Serbia
- League of Communists of Serbia
