= Janko Brašić =

Serbian artist

Janko Brašić Јанко Брашић
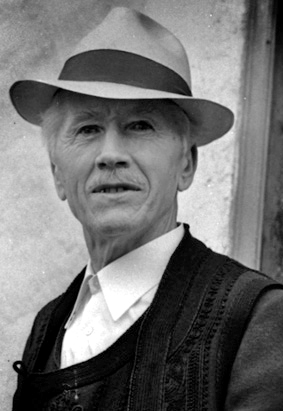
- Janko Brašić
- Born: Janko Brašić; January 9, 1906; Oparić; Serbia
- Died: June 15, 1994 (aged 88); Oparić; Yugoslavia
- Known for: Painting
- Movement: Naïve art

Janko Brašić (Serbian Cyrillic: Јанко Брашић; Oparić, January 1, 1906 – June 15, 1994) was a Serbian painter. He is considered to be one of the foremost contributors to the naïve art genre, with a worldwide reputation.

== Biography ==
Brašić was born in 1906 in Oparić near Jagodina. He began painting in 1927, but his earliest dated works are from 1933 (drawings and self-portrait in oil). He is considered as the founder of the Serbian naïve art. He died in his birth village of Oparić in 1994, where he lived and worked all his life.

== About himself ==
"I made my self-portrait as a testimony so that my fellow-countrymen would stay calm. If I painted someone else they could accuse me of the lack of resemblance since I got the picture and the man whose portrait I had made wouldn't be there for them to see him immediately. Well, this is how it was!… It was easy for me to make the portrait of myself … I looked at myself in the mirror and that's how I painted."

== Artistic style ==
As a chronicler of his time, he managed for a moment to check the passing of the old and patriarchal way of life, preserving the fluid of the past time. Rustic, elemental realism is his way of maintaining the primeval contact with his environment. Void completely of professional routine, his painting makes a harsh, sonorous impression. In a review of his work, an art critic wrote: "The development of Serbian naive art officially starts with the work of Janko Brašić. His earliest works (portraits) date from 1933. Rustic elementary realism is his way of expressing primordial relations with his surroundings. Lacking professional routine his paintings seem bitter and sounding. Scenes are mainly presented in a rural landscape; they possess bright colorization, without explicitly expressed focus. However, the most expressive are his psychological portraits. With almost six decades of fruitful work Janko Brašić will remain the symbol of naïve art in Serbia and Oparić will be widely famous as his homeland...".

== Exhibitions and awards ==
His first group exhibition was organized in 1935 by the Association of Serbian Artists in the Cvijeta Zuzorić Art Pavilion in Belgrade. It was an exhibition of portraits, in which Brašić exhibited a portrait of King Peter II and a self-portrait in oil. Besides scenes from rural life, historical myths and anecdotes – portraits dominate in Brašić's opus. The greatest collection of his paintings is at Museum of Naïve and Marginal Art (MNMA), Jagodina, Serbia.

== Gallery ==
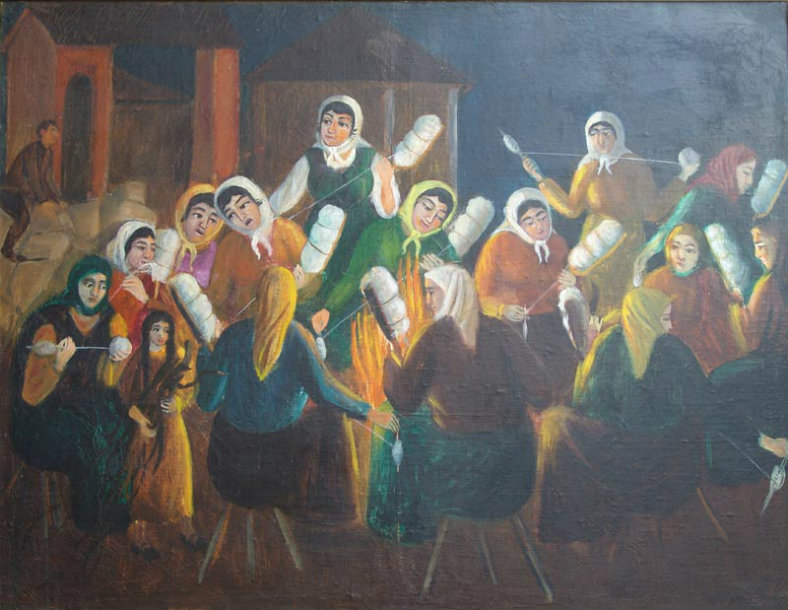
Gathering, 1959, oil on canvas, 75x100 cm, MNMA, Jagodina

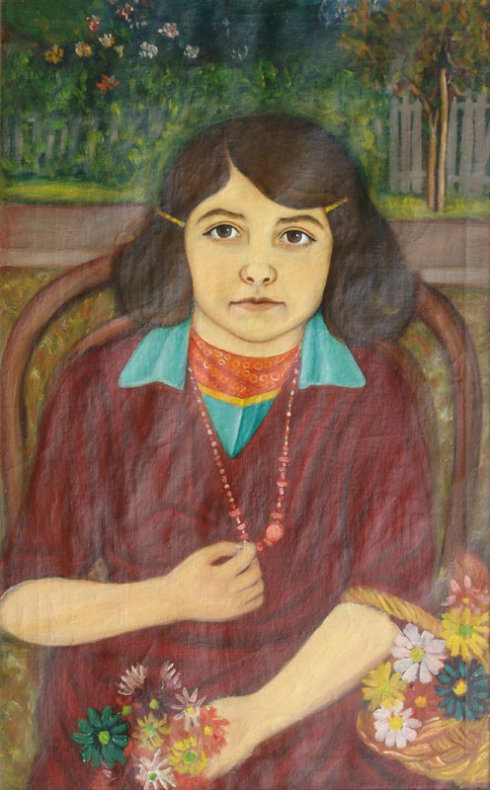
Portrait of Daughter, 1939, oil on canvas, 66x41 cm, MNMA, Jagodina

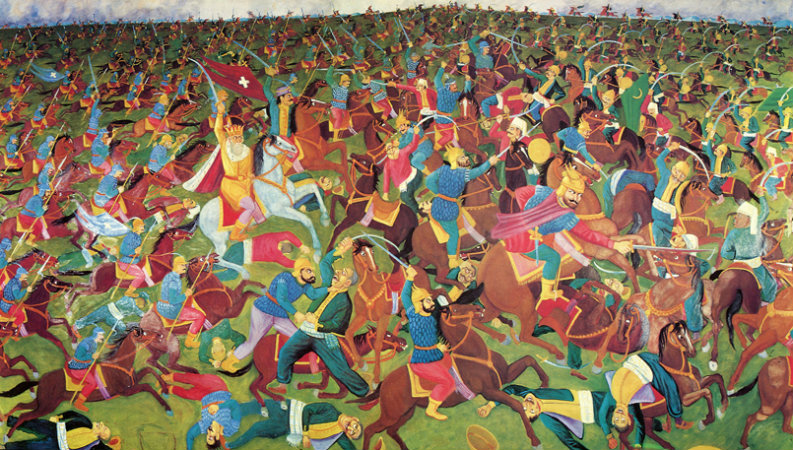
Battle of Kosovo, 1970–71, oil on canvas, 205x415 cm, MNMA, Jagodina

== See also ==
- List of painters from Serbia

== Literature ==
- М. Бошковић; М. Маширевић, Самоуки ликовни уметници у Србији, Торино, 1977
- Н. Крстић, Наивна уметност у Србији, САНУ, Београд - МНМУ, Јагодина, 2003
