= Milan Milutinović =

President of Serbia (1997–2002)

- Милан Милутиновић
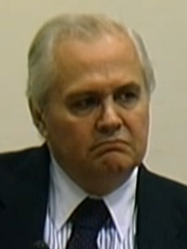
- Milutinović in 2005

President of Serbia
- In office 29 December 1997 – 29 December 2002
- Prime Minister: Mirko Marjanović; Milomir Minić; Zoran Đinđić
- Preceded by: Dragan Tomić (acting); Slobodan Milošević
- Succeeded by: Nataša Mićić (Acting); Boris Tadić

Minister of Foreign Affairs of Yugoslavia
- In office 15 August 1995 – 8 January 1998
- Preceded by: Vladislav Jovanović
- Succeeded by: Živadin Jovanović

Personal details
- Born: 19 December 1942 Belgrade, German-occupied Serbia
- Died: 2 July 2023 (aged 80) Belgrade, Serbia
- Party: SKJ (until 1990); SPS (1990–2023)
- Spouse: Olga Milutinović (m. 1970; died 2017)
- Education: University of Belgrade

Milan Milutinović (Note: Serbian Cyrillic: Милан Милутиновић, pronounced [mǐlan milǔtinoʋitɕ]) (19 December 1942 – 2 July 2023) was a Serbian politician who served as the president of Serbia from 1997 to 2002.

Milutinović served as Secretary for Education and Science of Serbia (1977–1982), Director of the National Library of Serbia (1983–1987), Ambassador of the Federal Republic of Yugoslavia to Greece (1989–1995), Yugoslavia's Federal Minister of Foreign Affairs (1995–1997). After his presidential term expired in December 2002, he surrendered to the International Criminal Tribunal for the Former Yugoslavia where he was tried for war crimes. He was found not guilty on all charges on 26 February 2009.

== Education and youth ==
Milan Milutinović came from an old Belgrade family. He was born in Belgrade to Aleksandar, a civil engineer, and Ljubica (née Jokić), an art historian. He attended school in Belgrade and graduated from the University of Belgrade Faculty of Law and obtained an LL.M in 1965.

== Early political career ==
From 1969 to 1971, he was a Member of the Presidency of the Yugoslav Socialist Youth Union, and, from 1974 to 1977 Secretary for Ideology of the City Committee of the League of Communists of Belgrade. Milutinović was a Member of the Federal Parliament of the Socialist Federal Republic of Yugoslavia from 1969 to 1974, during which time he served, inter alia, on the Foreign Affairs Committee.

== Secretary for Education and Director of the National Library ==
From 1977 to 1982, Milutinović was the Secretary for Education, Science and Sport of the Socialist Republic of Serbia. During his term, he worked on a comprehensive reform of the education system. His comparative research on higher education systems in Europe was published in his book, University-Eppur si Muove: University Reform-between Tradition and the Future (Belgrade, 1985). Following his term as Secretary for Education, Milan Milutinović was elected Director of the National Library of Serbia.

== Foreign Ministry ==
In 1987, during the term of Federal Secretary Raif Dizdarević, Milan Milutinović joined the Federal Secretariat for Foreign Affairs of the SFRY, as Ambassador and Head of Sector for Press, Information and Culture. In September 1989, Milutinović was appointed Ambassador of the SFRY to Greece.

As Yugoslavia broke up, Serbia and Montenegro formed the Federal Republic of Yugoslavia, and a UN embargo was imposed in May 1992, so new ambassadors could not be appointed, while Milutinović was never withdrawn by Belgrade, so during much of his term as Ambassador to Greece (between 1992 and 1995), Milutinović was FR Yugoslavia's only Ambassador to a Western state. In August 1995, Milutinović was appointed Foreign Minister of the Federal Republic of Yugoslavia. In November 1995, he was one of the leading negotiators during the Bosnia peace negotiations in Dayton, Ohio and one of the draftsmen of what subsequently became the Dayton Peace Accords, which led to the permanent cessation of hostilities in Bosnia-Herzegovina. During his term as Foreign Minister, he also signed several agreements between Yugoslavia and its neighbour Croatia aimed at normalizing relations between the two countries.

== Presidential election 1997 ==
After Slobodan Milošević's second, the last constitutionally allowable, mandate as the president of Serbia, he was controversially elected the president of FR Yugoslavia. Milošević's Socialist Party of Serbia still wanted to retain the Serbian presidency, and their first candidate in the Serbian presidential elections in 1997 was Zoran Lilić. The first two rounds of elections failed as the necessary majority (under the 1990 Constitution) of population failed to vote.

A coalition of Socialist Party of Serbia, Yugoslav Left and New Democracy decided to change their candidate for the repeated elections, as the leader of the nationalist Serbian Radical Party Vojislav Šešelj won the plurality against Lilić. Many of the opposition parties, led by the Democratic Party, boycotted the 1997 elections as they expected results manipulation.

Milutinović, a member of Socialist Party of Serbia, was the party's choice after Lilić's failure. In the second round of elections, held in December 1997, he won 2,177,462 votes or 59.18% by official count, while 50.96% voters turned out. Vojislav Šešelj, who got 1,383,781 votes or 37.61%, boycotted Milutinović's inauguration ceremony.

== Presidency ==
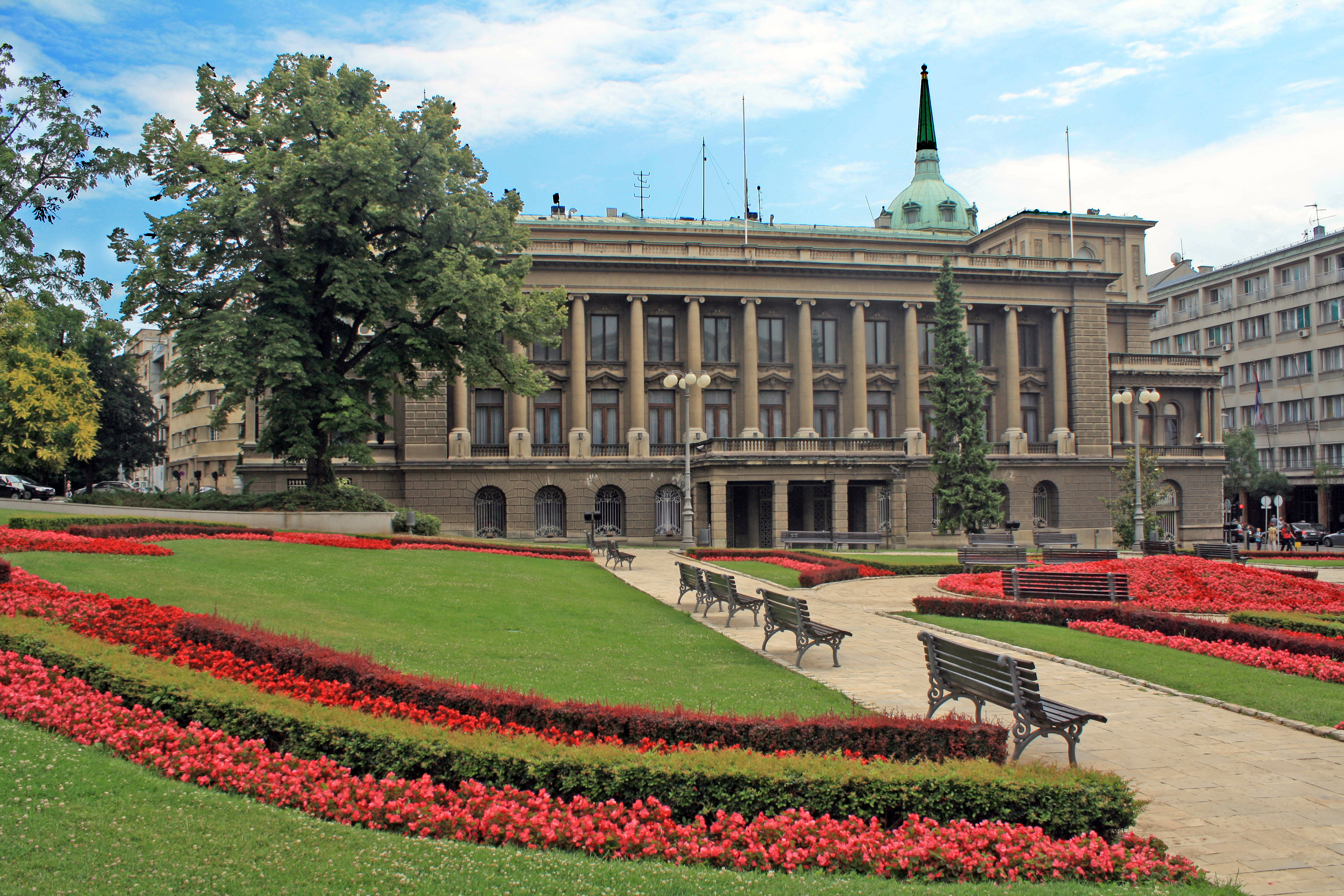
Novi dvor, the seat of the President of Serbia

As Milošević became the president of the Yugoslav Federation, political power shifted to the federal level along with him, and Milutinović de facto enjoyed little political influence. However, Milutinović was part of the Yugoslavian government's negotiation group in the Rambouillet Agreement in 1999, a prelude to the NATO campaign against Yugoslavia.

After Milošević and his party were ousted in October 2000 and their political power marginalized on federal, republic and most local levels, Milutinović still remained in office, as his term did not end until 2002. His powers as the president were trivialized from 2000 to 2002, since his political affiliation did not enjoy popular support and he could not be backed up by any other government branch. Milutinović was out of the eye of public performing only the most basic constitutional obligations without any opposition to the Democratic Opposition of Serbia coalition. In 2002, when his mandate expired, the presidential elections were held in which Milutinović did not run. He was succeeded by an acting president Nataša Mićić.

During the transition to democracy in late 2000, Milutinović refused to support a violent suppression of the October Demonstrations in Belgrade. The smooth relations between him and the new government, while in office, incurred the dislike of Milošević's closest allies, although there had never been an official rupture. At the same time, Milutinović did not enjoy the support of the Democratic Opposition of Serbia, as he in turn was considered, by most of its members, as a close ally of Milošević.

== ICTY indictment ==
Upon the expiry of his term in office, Milutinović turned himself into International Criminal Tribunal for the former Yugoslavia (ICTY) in 2003. He was tried under joint war crimes indictment along with five other Serb officials including Nikola Šainović and Dragoljub Ojdanić.

Milutinović was prosecuted on four counts: deportation, murder as a crime against humanity, murder as violation of laws or customs of war, and "other inhumane acts" during the War in Kosovo. The allegations include responsibility for mass murders at various locations during 1999.

According to the indictment, Milutinović had personal responsibility as the president of Serbia, with power over various governmental institutions. He was a member of the Yugoslavian Supreme Defense Council, thus making decisions in regard to the Yugoslavian Army. He also had a power to dissolve the Serbian Parliament. According to the indictment, during wartime his de jure powers were extended to ones belonging to the Parliament during peacetime, including control of the police, subordinate to the Army at the time. This claim was hotly contested by Milutinović's defense counsel and some constitutional lawyers, as the 1990 Constitution was written in view of Serbia possibly becoming a sovereign, unitary state, due to the impending collapse of Tito's Socialist Federal Republic of Yugoslavia (which finally occurred in mid-1991).

In reality, Serbia was not sovereign, as it still formed part of Milošević's Federal Republic of Yugoslavia, whose President (Milošević) held the post of commander-in-chief of the armed forces. In addition, according to the defense, the Supreme Defense Council was not exercising operational control over Yugoslav troops, neither de jure nor de facto.

The ICTY Prosecution also claimed that Milutinović, as the president of Serbia, had de facto influence over the Parliament, the Army and the police (Ministry of Internal Affairs).

On 26 February 2009, Milutinović was acquitted on charges of war crimes. Finding Milutinović not guilty on all counts of the indictment, the court ruled that Milutinović had "no direct control over the Yugoslav army". Judge Iain Bonomy blamed Slobodan Milošević for the alleged crimes, and said that Milutinović was "not a key player in the ruling political party."

== Personal life and death ==
Milan Milutinović was married to Olga Milutinović (née Spasojević) from 6 December 1970 until her death, on 20 January 2017. They have one son, Veljko (born 1979). After his acquittal before the ICTY in 2009, Milutinović returned to live in Belgrade.

Milutinović died on 2 July 2023, at the age of 80.

== Notes ==
Political offices
Preceded by Dragan Tomić; Acting	President of Serbia; 1997–2002	Succeeded by Nataša Mićić; Acting
Government offices
Preceded by Vladislav Jovanović	Minister of Foreign Affairs; 1995–1998	Succeeded by Živadin Jovanović
Cultural offices
Preceded by Vaso Milinčević	Director of National Library of Serbia; 1983–1988	Succeeded by Milomir Petrović
