= Ministry of Foreign Affairs (Serbia and Montenegro) =

Former government ministry responsible for foreign affairs

- Serbo-Croatian: Ministarstvo inostranih poslova/Министарство иностраних послова
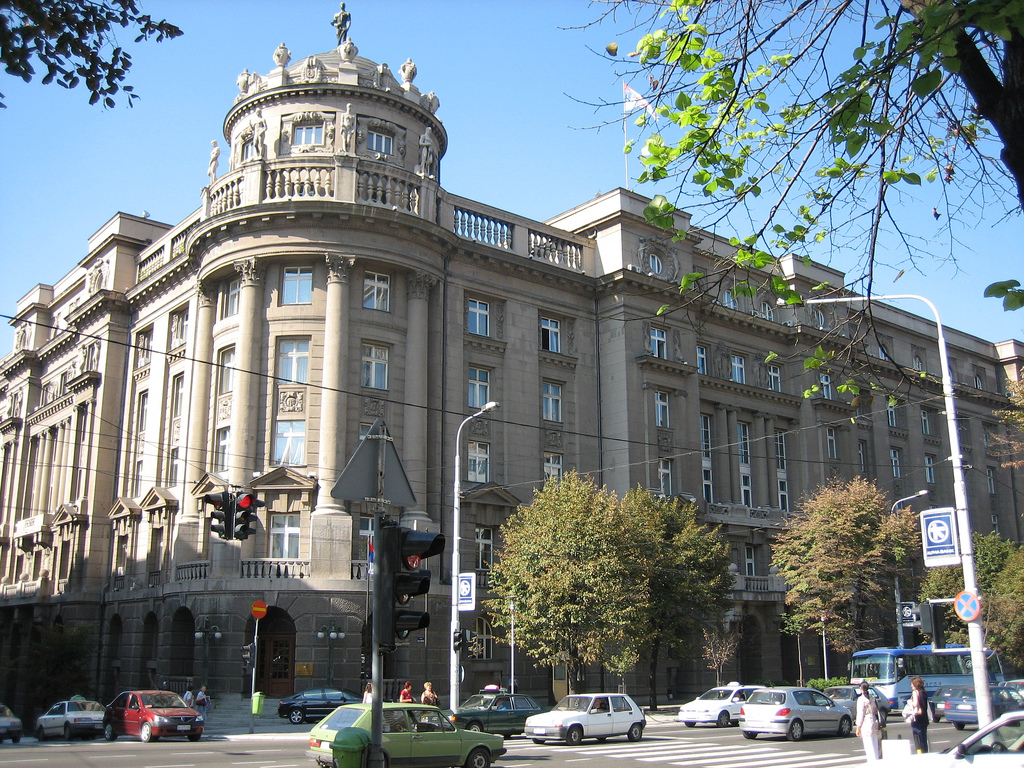
- The Ministry of Foreign Affairs Building

Ministry overview
- Formed: 15 July 1992; 34 years ago
- Dissolved: 4 June 2006; 20 years ago
- Jurisdiction: Serbia and Montenegro
- Headquarters: Ministry of Foreign Affairs Building, 24–26 Kneza Miloša, Belgrade; 44.8032°N 20.4566°E
- Ministers responsible: Vladislav Jovanović, first Minister of Foreign Affairs; Vuk Drašković, last Minister of Foreign Affairs
- Parent department: Federal Government of the FR Yugoslavia (1992–2003); Council of Ministers of Serbia and Montenegro (2003–2006)

The Ministry of Foreign Affairs was the ministry responsible for representing Serbia and Montenegro internationally (officially named the Federal Republic of Yugoslavia between 1992 and 2003) from 1992 to 2006.

== List of ministers ==
Following the breakup of Yugoslavia and the secession of four out of six constituent republics in the SFR Yugoslavia the remaining two (Serbia and Montenegro) established a federation in 1992 called the Federal Republic of Yugoslavia (FR Yugoslavia). This lasted until 2003 when it was reconstituted as a political union called Serbia and Montenegro. In 2006 Montenegro declared independence and parted ways.

No.	Portrait	Minister	Took office	Left office	Time in office	Party
1	Vladislav Jovanović	Vladislav Jovanović (1933–2026)	15 July 1992	30 September 1992	77 days	SPS
2	Ilija Đukić	Ilija Đukić (1930–2002)	30 September 1992	4 March 1993	155 days	DS
(1)	Vladislav Jovanović	Vladislav Jovanović (1933–2026)	4 March 1993	15 August 1995	2 years, 164 days	SPS
3	Milan Milutinović	Milan Milutinović (1942–2023)	15 August 1995	8 January 1998	2 years, 146 days	SPS
4	Živadin Jovanović	Živadin Jovanović (born 1938)	9 January 1998	4 November 2000	2 years, 300 days	SPS
5	Goran Svilanović	Goran Svilanović (born 1963)	4 November 2000	16 April 2004	3 years, 164 days	GSS
6	Vuk Drašković	Vuk Drašković (born 1946)	16 April 2004	4 June 2006	2 years, 49 days	SPO

== See also ==
- Ministry of Foreign Affairs (Yugoslavia)
- Ministry of Foreign Affairs (Montenegro)
- Ministry of Foreign Affairs (Serbia)

== Sources ==
- Žarković, Petar; Bešlin, Milivoj (2024). "Brijunski plenum kao idejni i koncepcijski sukob: spor oko Državnoga sekretarijata za vanjske poslove" [The Brijuni Plenum as an Ideological and Conceptual Conflict: The Dispute over the State Secretariat for Foreign Affairs]. Časopis za suvremenu povijest - Journal of Contemporary History (in Croatian). 56 (2). Croatian Institute of History: 49–76. doi:10.22586/csp.v56i2.28044.
