= Gorica Gajević =

Serbian lawyer and politician (1958–2024)

General Secretary of the Socialist Party of Serbia
- In office 2 March 1996 – October 2000
- Preceded by: Milomir Minić
- Succeeded by: Zoran Anđelković

Personal details
- Born: 20 May 1958 Valjevo, PR Serbia, FPR Yugoslavia
- Died: 16 December 2024 (aged 66)
- Party: League of Communists of Serbia (until 1990); Socialist Party of Serbia (1990–2000)
- Parents: Arsenije Gajević (father); Elvira Švikart (mother)
- Education: University of Belgrade Faculty of Law

Gorica Gajević (Serbian Cyrillic: Горица Гајевић; 20 May 1958 – 16 December 2024) was a Serbian judge, lawyer, and politician.

== Background ==
Gajević was born in Valjevo, People's Republic of Serbia on 20 May 1958. Her father, Arsenije Gajević, was an agronomy engineer, and her mother, Elvira Švikart, was a Swiss housewife. When she was five, they moved to Raška, where she grew up and graduated from the secondary school "25 May" in 1977. In 1981, she graduated from the University of Belgrade Faculty of Law. From 1982 to 1983 she was a trainee judge and then an expert associate from 1983 to 1984.

Gajević died on 16 December 2024, at the age of 66.

== Career ==
In 1984, she was appointed a judge in the Municipal Court of Raška where she served until 1989.

She was an active member of the League of Communists of Yugoslavia. In 1989, she became the president of the Municipal Committee of the League of Communists of Serbia in Raška, which became the Socialist Party of Serbia (SPS) in 1990. She held this position until 1992.

From 1990 to 1993, she was an elected member of the Federal Chamber of Citizens (lower house). In 1995, after the resignation of Milorad Vučelić, she became the head of the SPS parliamentary team. At the third SPS congress, held on 2 March 1996, she succeeded Milomir Minić as General Secretary of the Socialist Party of Serbia. Shortly after, she was appointed vice-president of the Federal Chamber of the Republics (upper house).

In October 2000, after the overthrow of Slobodan Milošević, she was forced to resign from the General Secretary position.
