= Milomir Minić =

Prime Minister of Serbia (2000–2001)

- Миломир Минић

Prime Minister of Serbia
- In office 24 October 2000 – 25 January 2001
- President: Milan Milutinović
- Preceded by: Mirko Marjanović
- Succeeded by: Zoran Đinđić

President of the Chamber of Citizens of the Federal Assembly of Yugoslavia
- In office 10 December 1996 – 7 October 2000
- President: Zoran Lilić; Slobodan Milošević
- Preceded by: Radoman Božović
- Succeeded by: Dragoljub Mićunović

Secretary-General of the Socialist Party of Serbia
- In office 24 October 1992 – 2 March 1996
- President: Slobodan Milošević
- Preceded by: Petar Škundrić
- Succeeded by: Gorica Gajević

President of the Presidency of the League of Communists of Serbia
- In office 24 May 1989 – 17 July 1990
- President: Bogdan Trifunović
- Preceded by: Zoran Sokolović
- Succeeded by: Petar Škundrić

Personal details
- Born: 5 October 1950 (age 76) Valjevo, Serbia, Yugoslavia
- Party: SPS (1990–present); SKJ (until 1990)

Milomir Minić (Serbian Cyrillic: Миломир Минић; born 5 October 1950) is a Serbian professor, scientist and former politician who served as the prime minister of Serbia from 2000 to 2001.

== Political career ==
A member of the Socialist Party of Serbia, he was a close associate of Slobodan Milošević. He was the fifth prime minister of the Republic of Serbia within the Federal Republic of Yugoslavia and ruled from 24 October 2000 to 25 January 2001.

Minić led a transitional government, which came into power a few weeks after the Overthrow of Slobodan Milošević, as a result of which then-prime minister Mirko Marjanović resigned on 21 October 2000.

His government was composed of Democratic Opposition of Serbia (DOS), Socialist Party of Serbia (SPS), and Serbian Renewal Movement (SPO) until extraordinary parliamentary elections were held on 23 December 2000.

Political offices
Preceded by Mirko Marjanović	Prime Minister of Serbia; 2000–2001	Succeeded by Zoran Đinđić
