= Budimir Lončar =

Croatian politician (1924–2024)

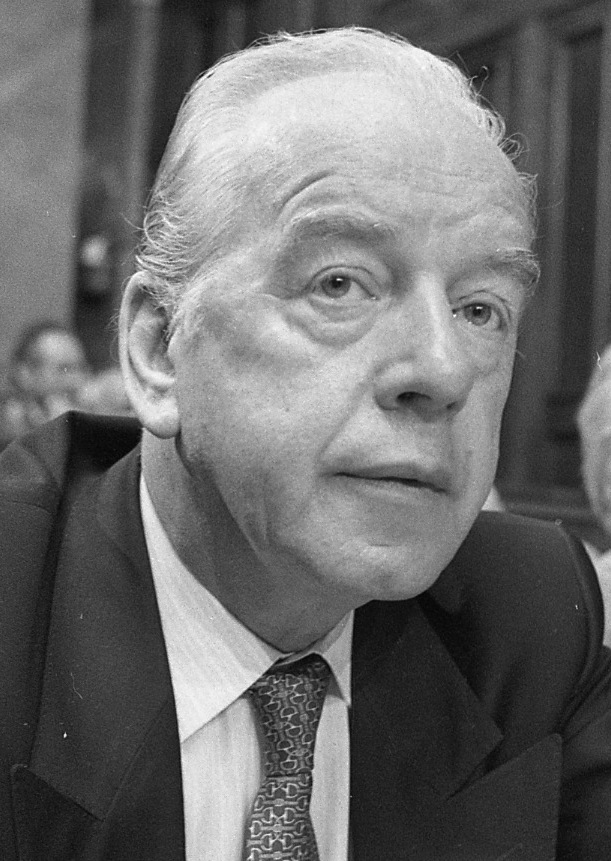

Minister of Foreign Affairs
- In office 31 December 1987 – 12 December 1991
- Prime Minister: Branko Mikulić; Ante Marković
- Preceded by: Raif Dizdarević
- Succeeded by: Milivoje Maksić (Acting)

Personal details
- Born: 1 April 1924 Preko, Kingdom of Serbs, Croats and Slovenes (modern Croatia)
- Died: 1 September 2024 (aged 100) Preko, Croatia
- Party: League of Communists of Yugoslavia (1945–1991)
- Parents: Ive Lončar (father); Ivana Lončar (maiden name: Šoša) (mother)

Budimir Lončar (1 April 1924 – 1 September 2024) was a Yugoslav and Croatian official and diplomat most notable for serving as Minister of Foreign Affairs of Yugoslavia from 1987 until 1991. Lončar also served as ambassador of Yugoslavia to Indonesia, Germany and the United States. In 1984, he was appointed Deputy Minister of Foreign Affairs of Yugoslavia, and in 1987 Minister of Foreign Affairs. He held this post until the disintegration of Yugoslavia in 1991.

From 1993 to 1995, Lončar served as the Special Representative of the UN Secretary-General to the Non-Aligned Movement. He was advisor in various NGOs, like Appeal of Conscience Foundation, The World Council of Religious and Spiritual Leaders in New York City, and the Centre for Humanitarian Dialogue in Geneva. He later served as an advisor to Croatian presidents Stjepan Mesić and Ivo Josipović.

== Early life and education ==
Lončar ancestors originally moved to the island of Ugljan from the Lika region. Budimir's father Ive and mother Ivana, both born in 1884, were both from the island of Ugljan. They had 10 children, 5 of which survived their early childhood, one of which was the youngest Budimir. Alongside Budimir, the other four were his oldest sister Anastazija (born in 1906), and his brothers Šime, Stanko, and Ante (Tonći). Budimir's father was a ship owner and he traded with the mainland city of Zadar which at the time was under the Italian control. The city of Zadar with its elegant buildings, gelato shops, and Perugina chocolates left a strong impression on young Budimir who described it as his first urban experience. His mother Ivana was a devout Roman Catholic and two of his uncles were Roman Catholic priests. Under the influence of his father Budimir moved to Zagreb to complete gymnasium high school. His class master and physics professor was Bogdan Ogrizović who influenced him to join Yugoslav Partisans.

=== World War II in Yugoslavia ===
During the World War II in Yugoslavia the country was divided and Lončar's region was incorporated into the Governorate of Dalmatia of the Kingdom of Italy. Lončar joined Yugoslav Partisans in June 1942 where he was active as a member of the League of Communist Youth of Yugoslavia. Under the mentorship of Jure Kaštelan Lončar edited Omladinska iskra magazine. He was wounded on two occasions, first in 1943 on the island of Ugljan and in 1944 on Dugi Otok.

== Early career ==
In May 1950, Lončar was invited to become consul and adviser at the Mission of Yugoslavia to the United Nations where he remained until 1956. After the posting at the New York mission he returned to Belgrade to the position of the Chief of Analytics and Political Planning at the Federal Ministry of Foreign Affairs where he remained until 1964.

== Post-retirement ==
Lončar turned 100 on 1 April 2024. Five months later, on 1 September, Lončar died in his birthplace of Preko, on the island of Ugljan.

== See also ==
- Yugoslavia and the Non-Aligned Movement
- Indonesia–Yugoslavia relations
- Germany–Yugoslavia relations
- United States–Yugoslavia relations

== Sources ==
- Jakovina, Tvrtko (2020). Budimir Lončar: Od Preka do vrha svijeta [Budimir Lončar: From Preko to the top of the World] (in Croatian). Zaprešić, Croatia]: Fraktura. ISBN 978-953358239-9.
