= Zoran Pjanić =

Serbian economist (1922–1991)

- Зоран Пјанић

Member of the Presidency of SR Serbia
- In office 6 May 1986 – 6 December 1989

Rector of the University of Belgrade
- In office 1985–1987
- Preceded by: Vojislav M. Petrović
- Succeeded by: Slobodan Unković

Personal details
- Born: 3 July 1922 Bitolj, Kingdom of Serbs, Croats, and Slovenes
- Died: 21 June 1991 (aged 68) Belgrade, Serbia, SFR Yugoslavia
- Party: KPJ/SKJ (1945–1990)
- Occupation: Economist; professor

Zoran Pjanić (Serbian: Зоран Пјанић; 3 July 1922 – 21 June 1991) was a Yugoslav and Serbian economist, professor, and politician.

== Early life ==
Zoran Pjanić was born on 3 July 1922 in Bitolj, Kingdom of Serbs, Croats and Slovenes. He finished primary and secondary education in his hometown. He later enrolled into the Faculty of Economics of the University of Belgrade where he earned his doctorate in 1956.

== Career ==
=== Academic ===
Pjanić worked at various institutions at the University of Belgrade from 1951 to 1979. He was also a member and president of scientific and economic institutions in Serbia and Europe. From 1985 to 1987 he was the rector of the University of Belgrade.

=== Politics ===
Pjanić joined the Yugoslav Partisans in 1942 and became a member of the Communist Party of Yugoslavia, later known as League of Communists of Yugoslavia, in 1945. He was a member of the Assembly of SR Serbia for several convocations. From 1986 to 1989 Pjanić was a member of the presidency of SR Serbia. In 1989, he was a candidate in the 1989 Serbian presidential election, which was won by Slobodan Milošević in a landslide.

He was a socialist.

== Personal life and death ==
Pjanić received the NIN Award for his 1984 book Samoupravni privredni sistem.

He died on 21 June 1991 in Belgrade.

== Selected works ==
- Problem stanovništva u ekonomskoj teoriji [The population problem in economic theory] (in Serbian). Belgrade: Nolit. 1957. OCLC 16442455. OL 20209976M.
- Specifična cena proizvodnje i stvarne cene u privredi Jugoslavije 1964-1968 [Specific production price and real prices in the economy of Yugoslavia 1964-1968] (in Serbian). Belgrade: Institut društvenih nauka. 1971. LCCN 72970421. OCLC 12167578. OL 5408250M.
- Radulović, Miloš; Pjanić, Zoran (1971). Sistem i politika cijena u Jugoslaviji (1945-1965) [Price system and policy in Yugoslavia (1945-1965)] (in Serbian). Belgrade: Institut društvenih nauka. OCLC 14767103.
- Lang, Rikard; Pjanić, Zoran (1971). Problemi ekonomskih funkcija Federacije vezanih uz djelovanje jedinstvenog tržišta [Problems of the economic functions of the Federation related to the functioning of the single market] (in Croatian). Zagreb: Ekonomski Institut. OCLC 6793872.
- Ekonomska kriza, uzroci i izlazi [Economic crisis, causes and solutions] (in Serbian). Belgrade: Kolarčev narodni univerzitet. 1985. LCCN 85182411. OL 2617001M.
- Jović, Borisav; Pjanić, Zoran (1988). Akcija za promene [Action for change] (in Serbian). Belgrade: Ekonomika. ISBN 9788671130257. OCLC 456664385.
- Vukmirica, Vujo; Pjanić, Zoran (1988). Kapital i socijalizam : savremeni ekonomsko-socijalni sistemi [Capital and socialism: contemporary economic and social systems] (in Serbian). Belgrade: Naučna knjiga. ISBN 9788623040115. OCLC 440402528.
- Pjanić, Zoran; Bajec, Jurij (1991). Tržište kapital svojina [Market, capital, property] (in Serbian). IP Ekonomika, Beogradska banka D.D. LCCN 92204180. OL 1325969M.
