= Slobodan Unković =

Serbian politician

- Слободан Унковић
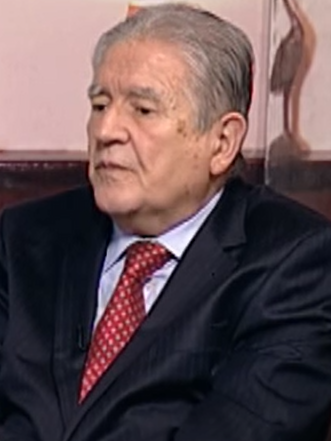
- Unković in 2017

1st speaker of the National Assembly of Serbia
- In office 11 January 1991 – 5 June 1991
- President: Slobodan Milošević
- Preceded by: Zoran Sokolović (President of the People's Assembly of Serbia)
- Succeeded by: Aleksandar Bakočević

Minister of Science
- In office 10 February 1993 – 28 May 1996
- Prime Minister: Nikola Šainović; Mirko Marjanović
- Preceded by: Divna Trajković
- Succeeded by: Dušan Kanazir

Personal details
- Born: 19 December 1938 (age 87) Trebinje, Zeta Banovina, Kingdom of Yugoslavia
- Education: University of Belgrade Faculty of Economics
- Alma mater: University of Belgrade; Stanford University
- Occupation: Politician, diplomat

Slobodan Unković (Serbian Cyrillic: Слободан Унковић; born 19 December 1938) is a Serbian former politician, diplomat, and academic. He served as the rector of the University of Belgrade from 1987 to 1991, president of the National Assembly of Serbia in 1991, and minister of science from 1993 to 1996.

== Education and career ==
He finished secondary education in Dubrovnik. In 1961, he graduated from the University of Belgrade Faculty of Economics, where he finished Magistrate studies in 1964 and Doctoral studies in 1966. His further studies included specialization at Stanford University in the United States, as well as universities in the UK, Italy and other countries.

Unković was awarded a number of awards and decorations from Serbia and abroad.

He is an emeritus professor at Lomonosov University in Moscow and Renmin University in Beijing, as well as honorable holder of doctoral degree at Lincoln University in the U.S. and Mediterranean University in Montenegro.

Government offices
| Preceded by Divna Trajković | Minister of Science of Serbia; 1993–1996 | Succeeded by Dušan Kanazir |
Academic offices
| Preceded by Zoran Pjanić | Rector of the University of Belgrade; 1987–1991 | Succeeded by Rajko Vračar |
