= Radovan Stojičić =

Serbian politician

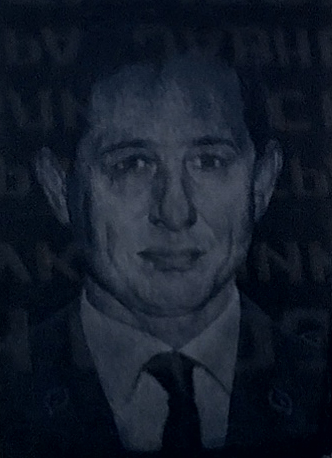

Minister of Internal Affairs (acting)
- In office 20 March 1997 – 11 April 1997
- Prime Minister: Mirko Marjanović
- Preceded by: Zoran Sokolović
- Succeeded by: Vlastimir Đorđević (acting)

Personal details
- Born: 1951 Niš, PR Serbia, FPR Yugoslavia
- Died: 11 April 1997 (aged 45–46) Belgrade, Serbia, FR Yugoslavia
- Education: University of Belgrade

Radovan "Badža" Stojičić (Serbian Cyrillic: Радован Баџа Стојичић; 1951 – 11 April 1997) was a Serbian police general, leader of the Public Security Service and acting Minister of Internal Affairs of Serbia.

== Biography ==
He graduated from the High School of Internal Affairs in Sremska Kamenica and the Faculty of Physical Education in Belgrade, where he received his master's degree in special forces physical fitness. He started as a beat officer and was in charge of Tašmajdan Park for many years. He was later transferred as a physical education officer to the Secretariat of Internal Affairs of Belgrade and led FK Milicionar. In the mid-1980s, he was transferred to the Serbian Ministry of the Interior, where he became deputy commander.

Stojičić became known for entering the Stari trg mine and putting a stop to the Kosovo miners' strike in 1989. He was also the commander of the Territorial Defense of Eastern Slavonia, Baranja and Western Syrmia in 1991, at a time of fierce conflict in the area. From there, he came to the position of Chief of Public Security in the Ministry of the Interior of Serbia, and in 1992, he was appointed Deputy Minister. In April 1993 by decree of the President of Serbia, Slobodan Milošević, he received the highest rank in the police: Colonel General.

When Zoran Sokolović was elected Federal Minister of the Interior, Stojičić was elected to serve as acting Minister of the Interior of Serbia.

== Death ==
Stojičić was murdered on 11 April 1997 in the Mamma Mia restaurant in Belgrade. He was killed while he sat with his sixteen-year-old son. His murder has not been solved.

He is interred in the Alley of Distinguished Citizens in the Belgrade New Cemetery.

== See also ==
- List of unsolved murders
