= Stanko Radmilović =

Prime Minister of Serbia (1989–1991)

Stanko Radmilović Станко Радмиловић

Prime Minister of Serbia President of the People's Government of Serbia
- In office 5 December 1989 – 11 February 1991
- Preceded by: Desimir Jevtić
- Succeeded by: Dragutin Zelenović

Personal details
- Born: 21 July 1936 Oljasi, Požega, Kingdom of Yugoslavia
- Died: 24 November 2018 (aged 82) Novi Sad, Serbia
- Party: League of Communists of Yugoslavia
- Education: University of Osijek; University of Belgrade

Stanko Radmilović (Serbian Cyrillic: Станко Радмиловић; 21 July 1936 – 24 November 2018) was a Serbian and Yugoslav politician and university professor who served as the prime minister of Serbia from 1989 to 1991, the last one to serve during the one-party rule.

== Biography ==
He graduated from the Faculty of Economics in Osijek, majoring in industry, and went on to receive his PhD in financial investments from the University of Belgrade Faculty of Economics.

Radmilović started his working career in 1960 as a planner in the iron foundry in Požega, and in 1963 he moved to the SEC "Lipa" where he was the financial director and assistant general director. In 1967, he became the financial director of the cement factory in Beočin, and in 1971 he moved to Vojvođanska banka. In 1973, he returned to the Beočin Cement Factory, where he was the Deputy General Manager. After three years, he moved to Vojvođanska banka, where he was an assistant general director, a member of the Management Board and the director of the Economic Center for Planning, Development and Scientific Research until 1986. During 1982, he participated in the development of the Long-Term Program of economic stabilization, and primarily in the part of the anti-inflation Program.

From 1986 to 1988 he was a delegate of Socialist Autonomous Province of Vojvodina to the Council of Republics and Provinces of the Assembly of SFR Yugoslavia, and from February to December 1989 he was a member of the Presidency of the Central Committee of SKJ. During 1988, he was a member of the Commission of the Federal Executive Council for the Reform of the Economic System.

In December 1989, he was elected President of the Executive Council of the Assembly of SR Serbia. He was the last one-party PM. During his mandate, on September 28, 1990, the Assembly adopted a new Constitution, which removed the prefix socialist from the name of the Republic of Serbia. On December 23, 1990, the first multi-party elections were held. After the parliamentary elections, on January 15, 1991, a new government was formed, headed by Dragutin Zelenović.

From February to July 1991, he was an independent scientific advisor at Vojvođanska banka and he later served as the acting general director of the Oil Industry of Serbia. In 1994, he was one of the initiators of the establishment and the largest shareholder of the Financing Center in Novi Sad, and until 2001 he was its general director. In the period from 1995 to 1997, he was a member of the Economic Council of the Government of the FR Yugoslavia, and from 1996 to 1998 he was the President of the Banking Section of the Association of Economists of Serbia.

He also worked at the university. In 1980, he was elected assistant professor for the subject of Economic Policy of Yugoslavia at the Faculty of Law in Novi Sad, and in 1992 he became associate professor of economics at the Faculty of Technical Sciences "Mihajlo Pupin" in Zrenjanin. He was elected full professor of economics at the University of Novi Sad in 1994.

== Selected works ==
- Kamata i srodni instrumenti u socijalističkom privrednom sistemu. Kamata u samoupravnoj socijalističkoj privredi, 1981
- Dokumenti Vanredne konferencije Saveza komunista Vojvodine, Novi Sad, 19. i 20. januar 1989, 1989
- Ekonomska kriza i društvena reforma, 1989
- Promena sistema i Srbija, 1991
- Primenjena i politička ekonomija : kobne zablude i fatalne posledice ideologizovane ekonomije: trnovit put izlaska iz krize, 1992

== See also ==
- Cabinet of Stanko Radmilović

Government offices
Preceded by Desimir Jevtić	Prime Minister of Serbia; 1989–1991	Succeeded by Dragutin Zelenović
