= Mihalj Kertes =

Yugoslav and Serbian politician (1947–2022)

- Михаљ Кертес
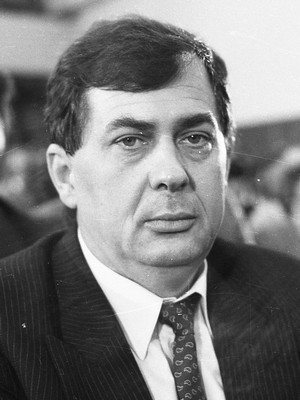

Director of the Federal Customs Bureau of FR Yugoslavia
- In office 1993 – 6 October 2000

Minister without portfolio
- In office 14 July 1993 – 18 March 1994
- Preceded by: Position established
- Succeeded by: Vekoslav Šošević

Member of the Presidency of SR Serbia
- In office 8 May 1989 – 28 September 1990
- President: Slobodan Milošević

Personal details
- Born: 29 August 1947 Bačka Palanka, PR Serbia, FPR Yugoslavia
- Died: 29 December 2022 (aged 75) Belgrade, Serbia
- Party: SKJ (1974–1990); SPS (1990–2015); SNS (2015–2022)
- Children: 2
- Nickname: Bracika

Mihalj Kertes (Serbian Cyrillic: Михаљ Кертес, Hungarian: Kertész Mihály; 29 August 1947 – 29 December 2022), nicknamed "Bracika", was a Yugoslav and Serbian politician. An ethnic Hungarian, he became a member of the League of Communists of Yugoslavia in 1974 and a close associate of Slobodan Milošević in the late 1980s.

He became a prominent figure during the anti-bureaucratic revolution. Kertes was a candidate in the 1989 election for the presidency of Serbia within Yugoslavia but lost in a landslide to Milošević. He joined the Socialist Party of Serbia in 1990 and became the director of the Federal Customs Bureau of Federal Republic of Yugoslavia in 1993. Kertes provided logistic and financial support for various undercover government operations until the overthrow of Slobodan Milošević, which occurred on 5 October 2000. After the overthrow, Kertes was sentenced, tried, and acted as a witness in several trials.

== Early life ==
Mihalj Kertes was born on 29 August 1947 in Bačka Palanka, PR Serbia, FPR Yugoslavia, to a Hungarian father Mihalj (Hungarian: Mihály), a tailor, and a Croatian mother Olga, a housewife. He attended primary and middle school, as well as the Higher School of Management, with a major in social work, in his hometown.

== Career ==
=== Early period ===
He started working as a social work clerk in municipal administrations and became a member of the League of Communists of Yugoslavia in 1974. He became a leading figure in the town of Bačka Palanka in 1981, while his career later progressed to the level of secretary of the municipal committee of the Communist League in 1986. During the party's transformation into the Socialist Party of Serbia (SPS), Kertes became a supporter of Slobodan Milošević. He took part in the 1989 Serbian presidential election, but lost to Milošević in a landslide.

=== Rise to prominence ===
Kertes became a prominent figure when, during the anti-bureaucratic revolution in support of Milošević's politics, he initiated the protests in Bačka Palanka and led the protesters to Novi Sad, the capital of SAP Vojvodina. The event, known as the "Yogurt Revolution", led to resignation of the provincial leadership and installation of loyalists to Milošević. His statement "How can you Serbs be afraid of Serbia when I, a Hungarian, am not afraid of Serbia?" made him particularly famous. These activities helped his progression to Serbian presidency membership, and in 1990 he was elected to the Assembly of Serbia as a member of parliament for the Grocka—a suburb of Belgrade—although he did not live there. In 1991, he temporarily withdrew from the public eye and, under the auspices of the State Security, on the eve of the War in Croatia, he travelled across Serb-populated areas in Croatia and Herzegovina, distributing weapons to local Serbs. In July 1991, he made another historic statement in Nikšić: "Here we will build a great Serbian state, with the border on the left shore of Neretva and Dubrovnik as the capital". Subsequently, he was installed as the head of the state security department of the Federal Ministry of Interior, and as the assistant to Federal Minister of Interior Petar Gračanin (1992–93). Prime Minister Milan Panić removed him from his position after an incident at the London Conference, when it was discovered that he induced Vladislav Jovanović to carry a secret listening device, and that he was listening on the other end. He was linked to formation of Serbian paramilitary units in Croatia (especially in eastern Slavonia) and Bosnia and Herzegovina in 1992 and 1993.

Kertes reached the ultimate and the most lucrative peak of his career when he was appointed the head of the Yugoslav Customs Office in 1993, a post he held until 6 October 2000. The position allowed him to impose whatever tax was necessary on goods, and the customs duties functioned as a state budget in shadow. They were a financial source for a vast range of operations, including funding the paramilitary units in the Croatian and Bosnian wars, money laundering in foreign off-shore banks, and filling private pockets of people close to Milošević. He had Milošević's trust throughout his tenure. UN sanctions meant that the entire lucrative turnover of goods, especially such as tobacco and oil, had to be effectively smuggled, a privilege that was given only to a select few. Milošević's son, Marko, had an effective monopoly of dealing Phillip Morris cigarettes in FR Yugoslavia. From his position, Kertes distributed an enormous number of gifts, chiefly vehicles and luxury goods, and the beneficiaries ranged from underdeveloped villages, through various state and local officials, to various special police, military and paramilitary units. During his reign, he was a man of unlimited power in his hometown Bačka Palanka. Apart from his love of fishing using nets and dynamite, he is also remembered for driving an armoured limousine to his mother's house through the town. He had the power to sack whoever he did not like, and provided benefits to loyalists. The town provided around 800 customs officials out of 2300 the country's total during his mandate.

=== Fall from power ===
After the overthrow of Slobodan Milošević on 5 October 2000, activists of the Democratic Opposition of Serbia broke into the customs headquarters, where they found Kertes and his associates shredding documents. Other items found in the suite included US$ 1.3 million in various currencies, 18 pounds of drugs, about 50 weapons, and ten bulletproof luxury cars. After a brief detention, Kertes was permitted to leave the office, but subsequently faced various charges. After two retrials, in February 2007, Kertes was sentenced to 2.5 years in prison for providing a truck to the executioners of opposition politicians in the 1999 Ibarska magistrala assassination.

In September 2007, he faced trial for abuse of office and embezzlement. Among other crimes, the prosecution charged the group, consisting of Milošević, Jovan Zebić, and Nikola Šainović with transferring 120 million German marks to Cyprus banks, where the trace was lost. Only Kertes faced trial, as Milošević and Zebić died, and Šainović had been standing trial in International Criminal Tribunal for the former Yugoslavia in The Hague. In November 2012, the Appellate Court reached its final verdict of six years and six months in prison for Kertes for illegal transfer of money to Cyprus and embezzlement of state budget for 1.5 million dinars. The sentence was joined with the previous one of 1.5 years for his participation in the Ibarska magistrala assassination. He was absolved of charges of "joint criminal venture" with Milošević, Zebić and Šainović. However, in March 2013, the Supreme Court of Cassation reversed the verdict and ordered a reconsideration by the Appellate Court. In August 2014, he was released of all charges of embezzlement due to absolute obsolescence. Kertes also faced several trials for tobacco smuggling during the 1990s and "abuse of official role". In December 2015, the Appellate Court reached a final verdict of 2.5 years in prison in one such case. In the same year, it was reported that he had left SPS and joined the Serbian Progressive Party.

== Personal life and death ==
Kertes was an ethnic Hungarian. His nickname was "Bracika". He was married and had two children. He died on 29 December 2022 at age 75 in Belgrade.

== Citations ==
- LeBor, Adam (2012). Milosevic: A Biography. Bloomsbury Publishing. ISBN 978-1-4088-2770-3.
- Dobbs, Michael (29 November 2000). "Crash of Yugoslavia's Money Man". The Washington Post.
- Thomas, Robert (1999). Serbia Under Milosevic: Politics in the 1990s. C. Hurst & Co. Publishers. pp. 46–. ISBN 978-1-85065-367-7.
- Cohen, Lenard (2001). Serpent in the Bosom: The Rise and Fall of Slobodan Milošević. Westview Press. ISBN 978-0-8133-2902-4.

Government offices
Preceded by Position established	Minister without portfolio 14 July 1993 – 18 March 1994	Succeeded by Vekoslav Šošević
Preceded by	Director of the Federal Customs Bureau of FR Yugoslavia; 1993–2000	Succeeded by
