= Ilija Đukić =

Serbian diplomat (1930–2002)

- Илија Ђукић

Minister of Foreign Affairs of Yugoslavia
- In office 30 September 1992 – 4 March 1993
- Preceded by: Vladislav Jovanović
- Succeeded by: Vladislav Jovanović

Personal details
- Born: 4 January 1930 Novi Rujac, Serbia, Kingdom of Yugoslavia
- Died: 22 October 2002 (aged 72) Belgrade, Serbia, FR Yugoslavia
- Party: Democratic Party

Ilija Đukić (January 4, 1930 – October 22, 2002) was a Serbian diplomat who held the post of Foreign Minister for the Federal Republic of Yugoslavia.

== Career ==
Đukić attended the Institute for Political Sciences in Beijing, China graduating in 1959. The Yugoslav foreign service proceeded to give him a succession of posts in the Far East, until he was moved to Eastern Europe and Moscow in the 1970s and 1980s. In 1990, he again returned to Beijing, now as an Ambassador.

From 1992 to 1993, he was serving as the Foreign Minister of FR Yugoslavia.

His final post was as the Yugoslav Ambassador to China from 2000 to 2002.

Government offices
| Preceded by Vladislav Jovanović | Minister of Foreign Affairs; 1992 – 1993 | Succeeded by Vladislav Jovanović |
