= Dragutin Zelenović =

Prime Minister of Serbia (1991)

- Драгутин Зеленовић
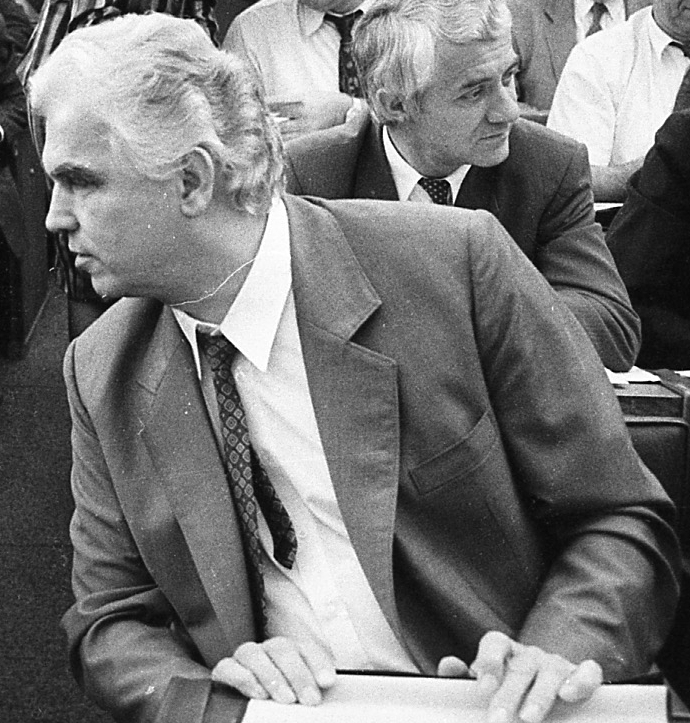

Prime Minister of Serbia
- In office 11 February 1991 – 11 December 1991
- President: Slobodan Milošević
- Preceded by: Stanko Radmilović
- Succeeded by: Radoman Božović

Personal details
- Born: 19 May 1928
- Died: 27 April 2020 (aged 91) Novi Sad, Serbia
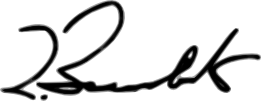
- Signature

Dragutin Zelenović (Serbian: Драгутин Зеленовић; 19 May 1928 – 27 April 2020) was a Serbian politician who served as the prime minister of Serbia from February to December 1991. He was a professor at the University of Novi Sad, Faculty of Technical Sciences, served as rector of the University of Novi Sad (1987–89) and was in 1987 elected a corresponding member of Serbian Academy of Sciences and Arts. He also served as a member of the Presidency of Yugoslavia from 1989 to 1991.

Zelenović died in Novi Sad on 27 April 2020, at the age of 91.

Political offices
Preceded by Stanko Radmilović (as President of the Executive Council of the Socialist Republic of Serbia)	Post created Prime Minister of Serbia; 1991	Succeeded by Radoman Božović
