= Milivoje Maksić =

Serbian politician

- Миливоје Максић
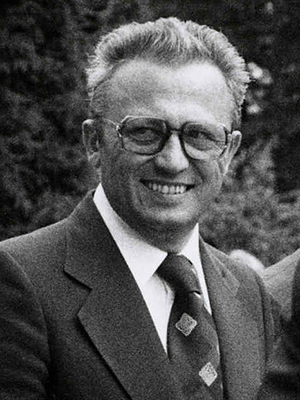

Minister of Foreign Affairs of Yugoslavia
- In office 12 December 1991 – 28 April 1992
- Preceded by: Budimir Lončar
- Succeeded by: Post abolished

Personal details
- Born: 19 January 1928 Belgrade, Kingdom of Serbs, Croats and Slovenes
- Died: 2 March 2003 (aged 75) Belgrade, Serbia and Montenegro
- Party: SKJ
- Awards

Milivoje Maksić (Serbian Cyrillic: Миливоје Максић; 19 January 1928 – 2 March 2003) was a Yugoslav diplomat, politician and author.

== Biography ==
Maksić finished high school in Smederevo and studied in Belgrade. He spent his entire career in diplomacy, serving as Deputy Secretary, clerk and press advisor in Yugoslav embassies in several countries.

He served as a foreign policy adviser to Josip Broz Tito, and then briefly to Presidency of SFRY.

Maksić had been the ambassador of SFR Yugoslavia to the People's Republic of Poland since 1982.

He retired on the last day of the formal-legal existence of socialist Yugoslavia, reportedly due to policy disagreements with the regime of Slobodan Milosević.

He published over 200 analytical papers, and after his retirement he was active within the Forum for International Relations, especially in terms of elaboration of strategic concepts and development of alternative directions of foreign policy. In 2001 his book U raskoraku sa svetom was published by Helsinki Committee for Human Rights.

Maksić was awarded several Yugoslav decorations and the Legion of Honour in the rank of Officer.

Government offices
Preceded by Budimir Lončar	Minister of Foreign Affairs of Yugoslavia; 1991–1992	Succeeded by Post abolished
