= Oparić =

Village in Serbia

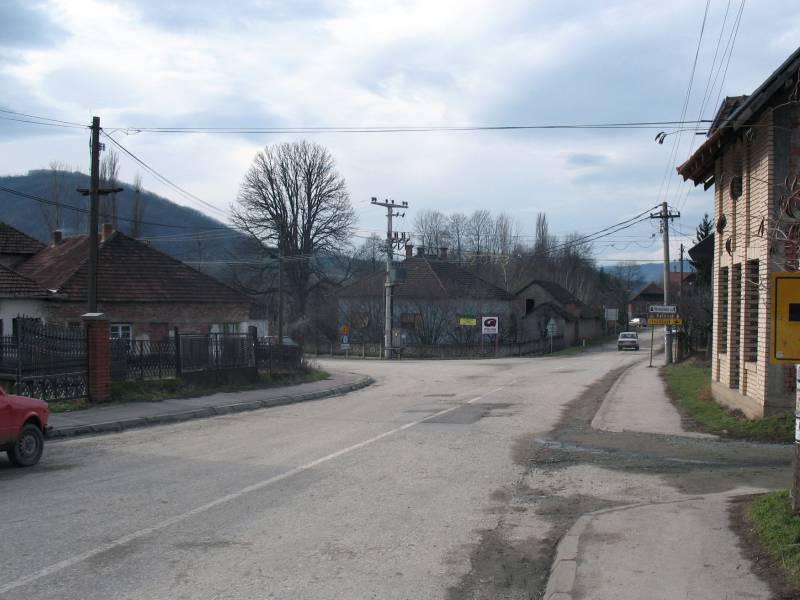

Oparić (Serbian Cyrillic: Опарић) is a village in Central Serbia, in the municipality of Rekovac (Region of Levač). The village has around 938 residents. It lies at 43°45′00″N 21°07′11″E, at the altitude of 295 m. The Oparić is well known as birthplace of native artist Janko Brašić.
