= Desimir Jevtić =

Serbian politician

- Десимир Јевтић
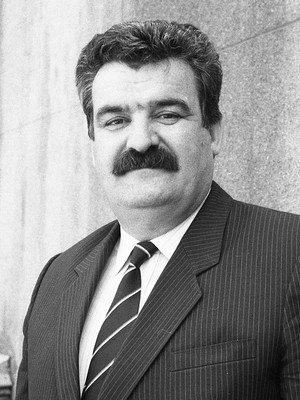

Prime Minister of Serbia President of the People's Government of Serbia
- In office 6 May 1986 – 5 December 1989
- Preceded by: Branislav Ikonić
- Succeeded by: Stanko Radmilović

Personal details
- Born: 16 December 1938 Oparić, Kingdom of Yugoslavia
- Died: 13 October 2017 (aged 78) Belgrade, Serbia
- Party: League of Communists of Yugoslavia
- Education: University of Belgrade
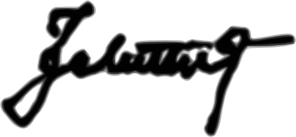
- Signature

Desimir Jevtić (Serbian Cyrillic: Десимир Јевтић; 16 December 1938 – 13 October 2017) was a Yugoslav and Serbian mechanical engineer, university professor, and politician who served as prime minister of Serbia from 1986 to 1989.

== Biography ==
Jevtić was born on 16 December 1938 in Oparić, which at the time was a part of the Kingdom of Yugoslavia. He graduated in 1962 at the Faculty of Mechanical Engineering at the University of Belgrade, while he completed his postgraduate studies in 1978 and earned his PhD in the field of technical sciences.

From 1978 to 1981 he was a professor at the Faculty of Mechanical Engineering branch in Kraljevo and from 1981 to 1986 he was a director of the state owned enterprise called "14th October" in Kruševac.

From 6 May 1986 to 5 December 1989 he served as the president of the executive council of the Assembly of SR Serbia, and in 1990 he was named the Ambassador of Yugoslavia to Romania.

He died on 13 October 2017 in Belgrade at the age of 78.

== Scientific work and recognitions ==
He is the author of the books, multiple scientific works published in Yugoslavia and abroad. Jevtić spoke Russian, English and Romanian.

He is an honorary doctor of science at the University of Bucharest and a holder of the Order of Labor with a silver wreath and other Yugoslav decorations.

Jevtić was also engaged in painting and sculpture and had 12 solo exhibitions in the country and abroad.
