= Bogdan Trifunović =

Yugoslav and Serbian communist politician and diplomat

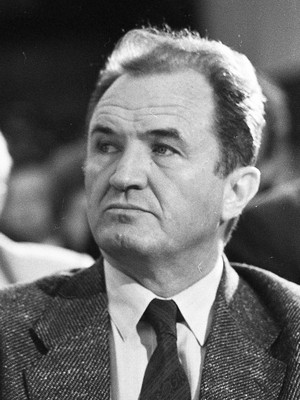
Trifunović in the Assembly of SR Serbia

Bogdan Trifunović (Serbian Cyrillic: Богдан Трифуновић; 28 December 1933 – 25 July 2007) was a Yugoslav and Serbian politician and diplomat who served as the last president of the Presidency of the Central Committee of the League of Communists of Serbia from 24 May 1989 to 16 July 1990.

He also served as the ambassador of FR Yugoslavia to France.

A close associate of Slobodan Milošević, he was named the vice president of the Socialist Party of Serbia (SPS) following the breakup of Yugoslavia. He left the party in 1998.
