= Father of the House =

Longest-serving continuous member of parliament

Father of the House is a title that has been traditionally bestowed, unofficially, on certain members of some legislatures, most notably the House of Commons in the United Kingdom. In some legislatures the title refers to the longest continuously serving member, while in others it refers to the oldest member. Recently, the title Mother of the House or Mother of Parliament has also been used, although the usage varies among countries; it is either the female alternative to Father of the House, being applied when the relevant member is a woman, or refers to the oldest or longest-serving woman without reference to male members.

== United Kingdom ==
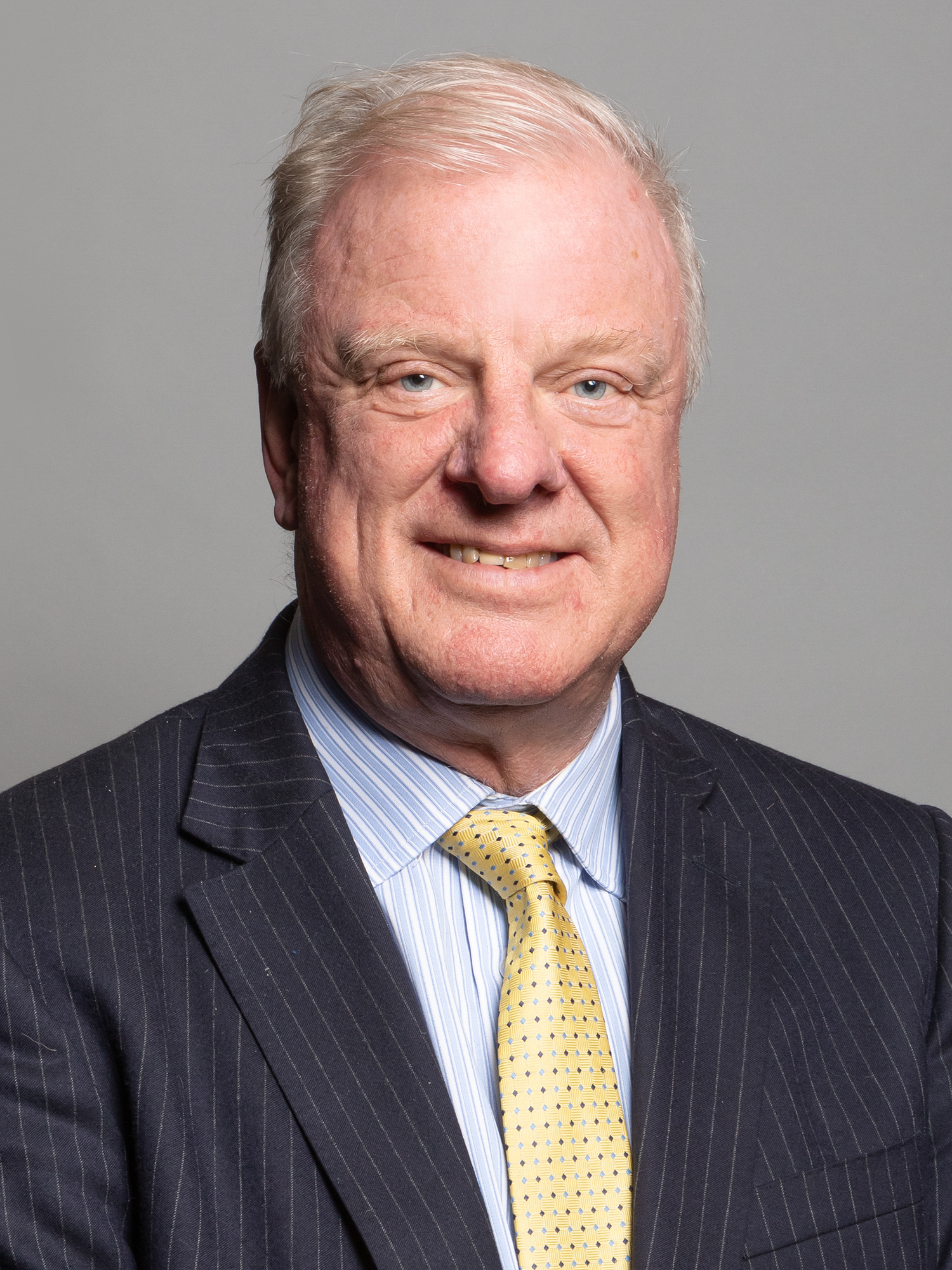
Sir Edward Leigh, the incumbent Father of the UK House of Commons

The Father of the House is a title that is bestowed on the senior male member of the House of Commons who has the longest continuous service. If two or more members have the same length of current uninterrupted service, then whoever was sworn in earlier, as listed in Hansard, is named as Father of the House. Traditionally, however, the qualifications used for the Father of the House are not entirely clear and may have included the oldest member, the member with the longest aggregate service, or the member who entered the House longest ago. The first recorded usage of the term dates to 1788, in an obituary of Thomas Noel. In 2017, Harriet Harman was described as "Mother of the House" by Prime Minister Theresa May, in recognition of her status as the longest-continuously serving woman MP. During speeches at the re-opening of Parliament after the 2024 General Election, Diane Abbott was also described as the "Mother of the House" by Prime Minister Keir Starmer, and then Leader of the Opposition Rishi Sunak.

The only formal duty of the Father of the House is to preside over the election of the Speaker of the House of Commons. The Father of the House may also participate in ceremonial events, and is the second member to be sworn in after the Speaker.

Among the twentieth-century Fathers, there were several very prominent figures; four former prime ministers became Father of the House, and a fifth, Henry Campbell-Bannerman, was simultaneously Father of the House and Prime Minister from 22 May 1907 until shortly before his death on 22 April 1908.

=== Devolved legislatures ===
In the Senedd of Wales, Father of the House is an official title bestowed on the longest-serving Member of the Senedd. The first to hold the title was Rod Richards, who was the first member to be sworn in following the first election to the legislature in 1999, while the current father is John Griffiths, who was also elected in 1999. In the Scottish Parliament, both Father of the House and Mother of the House are used for the longest serving Members of the Scottish Parliament. The current mother is Christine Grahame while the current father is John Swinney, who were both first elected at the 1999 Scottish Parliament election. The Northern Ireland Assembly also grants the title of Father of the House to its longest serving male member. The current father is Alan Chambers.

== Australia ==
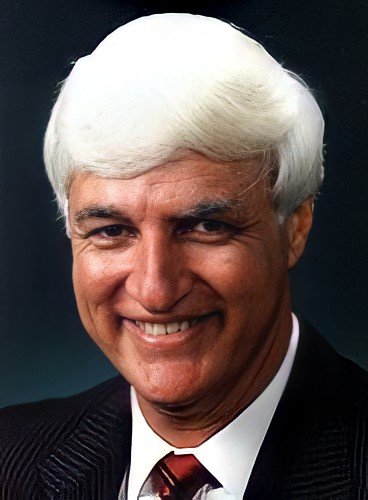
Bob Katter, the incumbent Father of the House

The titles "Father of the House" and "Father of the Senate" are sometimes used to refer to the members of each chamber of the Parliament of Australia with the longest continuous service. The current Father of the House is Bob Katter (MP since 1993; born 1945) and the current Mother of the Senate is Penny Wong (senator since 2002; born 1968).

According to House of Representatives Practice, the title Father of the House is a "completely informal designation" with "no functions attached to it". The equivalent publication for the Senate, Odgers' Australian Senate Practice, describes the title Father of the Senate as "now seldom referred to or used". It also notes that "as no woman senator has ever been in this situation, it is not clear what the title would be in that circumstance".

== Canada ==
The longest-serving member of the House of Commons who is not a cabinet minister is known as the Dean of the House, and presides over the election of the Speaker at the beginning of each Parliament. The current Dean of the House is Bloc Québécois MP Louis Plamondon, who was first elected to the Commons as a member of the Progressive Conservative Party in 1984 and serving as the Dean of the House since 2008.

== Czech Republic ==
In the Chamber of Deputies, if previous president of the Chamber of Deputies or his deputies are not elected, the oldest MP serves as the acting president presiding over the constitutive session, before new president is elected.

- 1993: Robert Dostál — Czech Social Democratic Party
- 1996: Zdeněk Jičínský — Czech Social Democratic Party
- 1998: Augustin Bubník — Civic Democratic Party
- 2002: Břetislav Petr — Czech Social Democratic Party
- 2003: Zdeněk Jičínský — Czech Social Democratic Party
- 2010: Karel Schwarzenberg — TOP 09
- 2021: Bohuslav Svoboda — Civic Democratic Party

In the Senate, if previous president of the Senate or his deputies are not elected for the next term, the oldest senator serves as the acting president presiding over the opening session gathered every two years, before election of the new president.

- 1996: Jaroslav Musial — Czech Social Democratic Party
- 2000: Jaroslava Moserová — Civic Democratic Alliance
- 2004: Bedřich Moldan — Civic Democratic Party
- 2010: Jiří Dienstbier — Czech Social Democratic Party
- 2011: Pavel Lebeda — Czech Social Democratic Party
- 2014: František Čuba — Party of Civic Rights
- 2018: Jaroslav Malý — Czech Social Democratic Party
- 2020: Jaroslav Doubrava — Severočeši.cz
- 2022: Jan Pirk – TOP 09

== European Parliament ==
Until 2009, the oldest member of the European Parliament presided over the opening of a new session and the election of the president of the European Parliament.

== Finland ==
| Member | Born | Entered parliament | Became oldest member |
|---|---|---|---|
| Iisakki Hoikka | 1840 | 1907 | 1907–1908 |
| John Hedberg | 1840 | 1908 | 1908–1909 |
| Leo Mechelin | 1839 | 1910 | 1910–1913 |
| John Hedberg | 1840 | 1908 | 1914 |
| Axel Lille | 1848 | 1916 | 1917 |
| Rabbe Wrede | 1851 | 1910 | 1917–1918 |
| Wilhelmi Malmivaara | 1854 | 1907 | 1919 |
| Artur Wuorimaa | 1854 | 1907 | 1920–1921 |
| Waldemar Bergroth | 1852 | 1917 | 1922–1926 |
| Juho Torppa | 1859 | 1907 | 1927–1929 |
| Anders Forsberg | 1864 | 1924 | 1929–1930 |
| Pehr Evind Svinhufvud | 1861 | 1907 | 1930–1931 |
| K. J. Ståhlberg | 1865 | 1908 | 1932 |
| Matti Paasivuori | 1866 | 1907 | 1933–1935 |
| Miina Sillanpää | 1866 | 1907 | 1936–1947 |
| Akseli Brander | 1876 | 1933 | 1948–1950 |
| Väinö Tanner | 1881 | 1907 | 1951–1953 |
| Matti Lahtela | 1881 | 1930 | 1954–1957 |
| Väinö Tanner | 1881 | 1907 | 1958–1961 |
| Raino Hallberg | 1890 | 1951 | 1962–1965 |
| Kustaa Tiitu | 1896 | 1945 | 1966–1969 |
| Rafael Paasio | 1903 | 1948 | 1970–1975 |
| Evald Häggblom | 1905 | 1966 | 1975, 1976 |
| V. J. Sukselainen | 1906 | 1948 | 1976–1978 |
| Mikko Kaarna | 1911 | 1960 | 1979–1982 |
| Tuure Junnila | 1910 | 1951 | 1983–1986 |
| Johannes Virolainen | 1914 | 1945 | 1987–1989 |
| Tuure Junnila | 1910 | 1951 (again 1990) | 1990 |
| Maunu Kohijoki | 1923 | 1987 | 1991–1994 |
| Martti Tiuri | 1925 | 1983 | 1995–2002 |
| Kalevi Lamminen | 1935 | 1987 | 2003–2006 |
| Claes Andersson | 1937 | 1987 | 2007–2008 |
| Jacob Söderman | 1938 | 1972 | 2008-2010 |
| Kauko Tuupainen | 1940 | 2011 | 2011–2013 |
| Jörn Donner | 1933 | 1987 (again 2013) | 2014 |
| Pertti Salolainen | 1940 | 1970 | 2015–2018 |
| Erkki Tuomioja | 1946 | 1970 | 2019–2022 |
| Kimmo Kiljunen | 1951 | 1995 | 2023– |

== Germany ==
Starting with the Frankfurter Nationalversammlung (Frankfurt Parliament) of 1848, and based on older regional traditions, basically all German nation-wide, state-level and lower parliaments had a father of the House at the start of each legislative period, usually called Alterspräsident (President by right of age). This elder statesman steps forward to break the tie among equal members, to open the proceedings and to arrange the very first self-organizing election without external help from e.g. parliament employees. Then, the elected president takes over.

This tradition was continued from the North German Confederation into the 1871 German Empire (also known as Weimar Republic after 1918) and, after being discontinued in Nazi Germany, was resumed in 1949 by the present Parliament (Bundestag) in the Federal Republic until it was discontinued again before the 2017 German federal election to prevent any member of the upcoming Alternative for Germany (AfD), or any other new party, as the position was changed to refer to the longest sitting member. Thus the meaning of Alter (age, literally oldness) was shifted from Lebensalter (age of life) to Dienstalter (age of service).

In accordance with tradition up to 2013, the Alterspräsident first ascertained himself that he was indeed the oldest member of the Bundestag by stating his date of birth and asking if anyone is present who was born before this date. If no older member of the Bundestag was present he would formally declare that he indeed is the Alterspräsident and will start proceedings. Starting from 2017, the prospective Alterspräsident states the number of years served in the Bundestag and asks if anyone has served more years.

The Alterspräsident then greets the present members and delivers the first programmatic speech. After appointing members to write down notes, the identity, affiliation to parties or factions and number of members is checked. The largest faction usually is asked who they propose as candidate for president, and according to another tradition, this candidate is then elected without much controversy. After supervising the election of the president of the Bundestag the Alterspräsident immediately yields his power to the elected president who, after receiving congratulations, takes over. The newly elected president will in turn supervise the elections of the vice presidents who form the Presidium of the Bundestag that organizes parliament sessions. Usually, each recognized faction proposes a candidate that is elected without much controversy. Since 2017, none of over 40 AfD candidates has been elected as Bundestags-Vizepräsident, though, while some state parliaments have elected an AfD vice president. In addition, the factions appoint members for the Ältestenrat, the Council of Elders of the Bundestag, which organizes the parliament work behind the scenes.

The rules of order of the Bundestag also state that the Alterspräsident shall preside over sessions of the Bundestag at any given time during a legislative period, if the whole Presidium (i.e. the president and the vice presidents of the Bundestag) is altogether unable to perform its duties. With the number of vice presidents growing over time, this became unlikely.

As the Alterspräsident's opening speech usually draws a certain amount of public attention, the position has recently attracted controversy, when after German Reunification the far-left Party of Democratic Socialism (the successor of the Socialist Unity Party of Germany which had ruled communist East Germany) obtained the position by including aged independents (writer Stefan Heym in 1994, Fred Gebhardt in 1998) in their party lists. In 2017, expecting the oldest representative of next Bundestag to be a member of the far-right AfD, parliament changed its rules of procedure to have the member with the longest service in the Bundestag serve as father of the house, rather than the oldest member. These changed rules of procedure nonetheless allowed Gregor Gysi of the far-left party Die Linke (the successor of the PDS) to attain this position.

Alterspräsidenten of the German Bundestag
| Bundestag | | Name | Term | Parliamentary party | Notes |
|---|---|---|---|---|---|
| 1 | 1949–1953 | Paul Löbe (1875–1967) | 1949–1953 | SPD | longtime Reichstagspräsident during the Weimar Republic |
| 2 | 1953–1957 | Marie Elisabeth Lüders (1878–1966) | 1953–1957 | FDP | stood in for Konrad Adenauer, the oldest member, who refused the position due to his position as Chancellor |
| 3 | 1957–1961 | Marie Elisabeth Lüders | 1957–1961 | FDP | stood in for Konrad Adenauer, the oldest member, who refused the position due to his position as Chancellor |
| 4 | 1961–1965 | Robert Pferdmenges (1880–1962) | 1961–1962 | CDU | stood in for Konrad Adenauer, the oldest member, who refused the position due to his position as Chancellor |
| 4 | 1961–1965 | Konrad Adenauer (1876–1967) | 1963–1965 | CDU | assumed the position after his resignation as Chancellor |
| 5 | 1965–1969 | Konrad Adenauer | 1965–1967 | CDU | died in 1967 |
| 5 | 1965–1969 | William Borm (1895–1987) | 1967–1969 | FDP | |
| 6 | 1969–1972 | William Borm | 1969–1972 | FDP | |
| 7 | 1972–1976 | Ludwig Erhard (1897–1977) | 1972–1976 | CDU | |
| 8 | 1976–1980 | Ludwig Erhard | 1976–1977 | CDU | died in 1977 |
| 8 | 1976–1980 | Johann Baptist Gradl (1904–1988) | 1977–1980 | CDU | |
| 9 | 1980–1983 | Herbert Wehner (1906–1990) | 1980–1983 | SPD | |
| 10 | 1983–1987 | Willy Brandt (1913–1992) | 1983–1987 | SPD | stood in for Egon Franke, who refused the position because of criminal investigations conducted against him at the beginning of the legislative period |
| 11 | 1987–1990 | Willy Brandt | 1987–1990 | SPD | |
| 12 | 1990–1994 | Willy Brandt | 1990–1992 | SPD | died in 1992 |
| 12 | 1990–1994 | Alfred Dregger (1920–2002) | 1992–1994 | CDU | |
| 13 | 1994–1998 | Stefan Heym (1913–2001) | 1994–1995 | PDS | resigned his seat in 1995 |
| 13 | 1994–1998 | Alfred Dregger (1920–2002) | 1995–1998 | CDU | |
| 14 | 1998–2002 | Fred Gebhardt (1928–2000) | 1998–2000 | PDS | died in 2000 |
| 14 | 1998–2002 | Hans-Eberhard Urbaniak (born 1929) | 2000–2002 | SPD | |
| 15 | 2002–2005 | Otto Schily (born 1932) | 2002–2005 | SPD | |
| 16 | 2005–2009 | Otto Schily (born 1932) | 2005–2009 | SPD | |
| 17 | 2009–2013 | Heinz Riesenhuber (born 1935) | 2009–2013 | CDU | |
| 18 | 2013–2017 | Heinz Riesenhuber (born 1935) | 2013–2017 | CDU | |
| 19 | 2017–2021 | Hermann Otto Solms (born 1940, member of parliament for 33 years, 1980–2013 and 2017–2021) | 2017–2021 | FDP | The Alterspräsident under the changed rules of procedure. Stood in for Wolfgang Schäuble (member of parliament for 45 years, since 1972), who was nominated (and subsequently elected) President of the Bundestag, so that he would not have to preside over his own election. |
| 20 | 2021–2025 | Wolfgang Schäuble (1942–2023, member of parliament 1972–2023) | 2021–2023 | CDU | |
| 20 | 2021–2025 | Peter Ramsauer (born 1954, member of parliament since 1990) | 2023–2025 | CSU | |
| 20 | since 2025 | Gregor Gysi (born 1948, member of parliament for 32 years, 1990–2002 and since 2005) | 2025– | Die Linke | |

== Hong Kong ==
In Hong Kong, there is no such term as "Father of the House". Instead, the longest-serving member was termed the Senior Unofficial Member and was the highest-ranking unofficial member of the Executive Council and the Legislative Council until the title was abolished in 1995 and 1992 respectively.

After the handover of Hong Kong, the member of the Legislative Council with the highest order of precedence, determined according to the length of continuous service in the council, was tasked with presiding over the election of President of the council, until 2017.

== Hungary ==
In Hungary, the term országgyűlés korelnöke (President by the age) refers to the oldest member of the National Assembly (previously House of Representatives, the lower house). Before the open session, the senior chairperson and junior notaries review the mandates of all the elected MPs in addition to their own. The member presides over the newly elected parliament until the appointment of the officials.

József Madarász who was Father of the House from 1892 to his death in 1915 at the age of 100, was also member of the Parliament from 1848 (whenever it was convened) and prior to that he was emissary of the Hungarian Diet, the predecessor of Parliament in Hungary, from 1832. Thus making him the longest serving member of Parliament in Hungary at a record of 82 years.

| Member | Party | Entered Parliament | Became oldest member | Left House |
|---|---|---|---|---|
| Géza Malasits | MSZDP | 1924 | 1945 | 1948 † |
| Géza Malasits | MDP | 1924 | 1945 | 1948 † |
| Dezső Pattantyús-Ábrahám | FMDP | 1947 | 1948 | 1949 |
| Ferenc Harrer | Ind. | 1949 | 1949 | 1969 † |
| Janka Stark | MSZMP | 1958 | 1969 | 1975 |
| László Pesta | MSZMP | 1949 | 1975 | 1990 |
| Kálmán Kéri | MDF | 1990 | 1990 | 1994 † |
| Vince Vörös | FKGP | 1990 | 1994 | 1994 |
| László Varga | KDNP | 1994 | 1994 | 2003 † |
| László Varga | Fidesz | 1994 | 1994 | 2003 † |
| János Horváth | Fidesz | 1998 | 2003 | 2014 |
| Béla Turi-Kovács | Fidesz | 1998 | 2014 | 2023 † |
| János Fónagy | Fidesz | 1998 | 2023 | 2026 |
| István Vitányi | Fidesz | 1998 | 2026 | |

== Israel ==
In the beginning of some Knessets, the oldest member assumes temporary duties of the speaker before the election of a permanent speaker, In the past it was the oldest member of Knesset, now it is the longest-serving member. The oldest member of the 25th Knesset is Benjamin Netanyahu.

== Ireland ==
In Ireland, the term Father of the Dáil is an unofficial title applied to the longest-serving Teachta Dála (TD) in Dáil Éireann. The current Father of the Dáil is Willie O'Dea having been first elected to the Dáil in the February 1982 general election. On a number of occasions, two or more people have shared the position of Father of the Dáil.

== Luxembourg ==
In Luxembourg's unicameral parliament, the Chamber of Deputies, there is no formal title for the oldest member. Per the Chamber's regulations, the longest-serving deputy (variously known as the doyen in French or déngschteelsten Députéierten in Luxembourgish) serves as President of the Chamber during the first session of a legislature, until a president is formally elected. They are assisted in this task by the two youngest members, known as secrétaires d'âge. Until 2004, the role was fulfilled by the oldest member (doyen d'âge).

Two deputies have served both as secrétaire d'âge and doyen over their careers: Jean Spautz (1959 and 1999) and Michel Wolter (1984 and 2023).

List of deputies who have presided by virtue of being the longest serving member
| Legislature | Member | Party | First elected | Time spent as member as of start of legislature |
|---|---|---|---|---|
| 2004–2009 | Jean Asselborn | LSAP | 1984 | 19 years, 363 days |
| 2009–2013 | Lucien Weiler | CSV | 1984 | 24 years, 357 days |
| 2013–2018 | Anne Brasseur | DP | 1979 | 29 years, 123 days |
| 2018–2023 | Gast Gybérien | ADR | 1989 | 29 years, 104 days |
| 2023–2028 | Michel Wolter | CSV | 1984 | 29 years, 280 days |

List of deputies who have presided by virtue of being the oldest member
| Legislature | Member | Party | Born | Age at start of legislature |
|---|---|---|---|---|
| 1887–1890 | Théodore de Wacquant | | 22 July 1815 | 72 years, 109 days |
| 1890–1893 | Théodore de Wacquant | | 22 July 1815 | 75 years, 105 days |
| 1893–1896 | Théodore de Wacquant | | 22 July 1815 | 78 years, 108 days |
| 1896–1899 | Théodore de Wacquant | | 22 July 1815 | 81 years, 111 days |
| 1899–1902 | Jean Föhr | | 2 March 1819 | 80 years, 250 days |
| 1902–1905 | Jean Föhr | | 2 March 1819 | 83 years, 247 days |
| 1905–1908 | Jean Föhr | | 2 March 1819 | 86 years, 250 days |
| 1908–1911 | Jean Föhr | | 2 March 1819 | 89 years, 253 days |
| 1945–1948 | Nicolas Wirtgen | | 16 January 1866 | 79 years, 294 days |
| 1948–1951 | Léon Kinsch | CSV | 10 November 1870 | 77 years, 253 days |
| 1951–1954 | Léon Kinsch | CSV | 10 November 1870 | 80 years, 242 days |
| 1954–1959 | Émile Reuter | CSV | 2 August 1874 | 79 years, 338 days |
| 1959–1964 | François Cigrang | DP | 1 March 1883 | 76 years, 4 days |
| 1964–1968 | Pierre Gansen | LSAP | 18 March 1896 | 68 years, 125 days |
| 1969–1974 | Antoine Krier | LSAP | 21 April 1897 | 71 years, 290 days |
| 1974–1979 | Joseph Grandgenet | KPL | 28 February 1898 | 76 years, 119 days |
| 1979–1984 | Jean-Pierre Urwald | CSV | 29 January 1905 | 74 years, 158 days |
| 1984–1989 | Jean-Pierre Urwald | CSV | 29 January 1905 | 79 years, 169 days |
| 1989–1994 | Jos Brebsom | LSAP | 23 March 1913 | 76 years, 117 days |
| 1994–1999 | Édouard Juncker | CSV | 30 July 1921 | 72 years, 353 days |
| 1999–2004 | Jean Spautz | CSV | 9 September 1930 | 68 years, 286 days |

== Malaysia ==
In Malaysia, the term "Father of the House" is rarely used. However, Tengku Razaleigh Hamzah, who was elected in 1974, was the previous longest-serving MP in the Dewan Rakyat. He was also the oldest MP between 2008 and 2018 (then-age 81), when former prime minister Tun Dr. Mahathir Mohamad was reelected to the Dewan Rakyat at the age of 92. Both of them ended their long tenures in the Dewan Rakyat after being defeated in 2022 Malaysian general election.

Since 2022, Tan Kok Wai is now the "Father of the House", having served as MP continuously since 1986, firstly for Sungai Besi (1986–1995) and now Cheras (1995–present).

== New Zealand ==
In New Zealand, the terms "Father of the House" and "Mother of the House", as unofficial titles, designate the longest-continuously serving male or female MP of the House of Representatives, respectively. The Father and Mother of the House have no official role in Parliament. The current Father of the House is Gerry Brownlee who has served continuously since 1996. The current Mother of the House is Melissa Lee who has served continuously since 2008.

== Norway ==
| Member | Born | Entered parliament | Became oldest member |
|---|---|---|---|
| Morten Kolbjørnsen | 1958 | 2025 | 2025 |

== Poland ==
Following a general election, the eldest member of each of the lower (Sejm) and upper (Senate) houses of the Polish parliament is given the honorary post of Senior Marshal until the new permanent leaders of the houses, the Marshal of the Sejm and the Marshal of the Senate, are elected in a vote by their respective members. This normally takes place as the first item on the agenda at the first session, over which the Senior Marshal presides. Most recently, the title of Senior Marshal was bestowed on Marek Sawicki, member of the X Sejm, and Michał Seweryński, senator of the XI Senate. Both assumed their roles on 13 November 2023, following the formation of the new parliament as a result of the 15 October general election.

== Russia ==
Cosmonaut Valentina Tereshkova in 2021 was first Mother of the House in Russia

Traditionally when a new Russian parliament is formed the eldest deputy opens and manages the first session until a chairman is elected. In the history of the post-Soviet Dumas these were:

| Elected | Name | Constituency | Party | Age when elected |
|---|---|---|---|---|
| 1993 | Georgy Lukava | Federal list | LDPR | 68 |
| 1995 | Grigory Galaziy | Federal list | NDR | 73 |
| 1999 | Yegor Ligachyov | Tomsk | CPRF | 79 |
| 2003 | Valentin Varennikov | Federal list | Rodina | 79 |
| 2007 | Zhores Alferov | Federal list | CPRF | 77 |
| 2011 | Vladimir Dolgikh | Federal list | United Russia | 86 |
| 2016 | Zhores Alferov | Federal list | CPRF | 86 |
| 2021 | Valentina Tereshkova | Federal list | United Russia | 84 |
| 2026 | Yury Petrov | Federal list | United Russia | 79 |

== Serbia ==
In the National Assembly of the Republic of Serbia, the oldest MP presides over the constitutive session, before the Speaker is elected.

- 2001: Zaharije Trnavčević — Democratic Party
- 2004: Velimir Simonović — Democratic Party of Serbia
- 2007: Borka Vučić — Socialist Party of Serbia
- 2008: Jovan Krkobabić — Party of United Pensioners of Serbia
- 2012: Zaharije Trnavčević — Rich Serbia
- 2014: Milan Korać — Party of United Pensioners of Serbia
- 2016: Dragoljub Mićunović — Democratic Party
- 2020: Smilja Tišma — Independent
- 2022: Vladeta Janković — Independent
- 2024: Stojan Radenović — Independent
- 2026: Stojan Radenović — Independent

== Singapore ==
Until his death on 23 March 2015, former prime minister Lee Kuan Yew was the longest-serving member of Parliament (Tanjong Pagar) and thus the Father of the House. As of April 2015, emeritus senior minister and former prime minister Goh Chok Tong later became Father of the House, as the longest-serving MP (Marine Parade). Upon Goh's retirement in 2020, Senior Minister and former prime minister Lee Hsien Loong, is Father of the House being the longest-serving MP (Ang Mo Kio) having served since 1984.

== Sweden ==
In Sweden, the Riksdagsordningen law states that the member of the Riksdag who has held their elected seat for the longest shall be the Ålderspresident which translates to President by age. The Ålderspresident acts as speaker of the Riksdag after each election, before the Speaker of the Riksdag has been elected. The Ålderspresident also acts as speaker in case of hindrance on behalf of the Speaker and all three Deputy Speakers.

Members of the Riksdag who has held the position of Ålderspresident since the abolition of bicameralism:

- Tage Erlander (first elected 1932) 1971–1973
- Torsten Nilsson (first elected 1941) 1973–1976
- Henry Allard (first elected 1945) 1976–1979
- Gunnar Sträng (first elected 1946) 1979–1985
- Ingemund Bengtsson (first elected 1951) 1985–1988
- Stig Alemyr (first elected 1957) 1988–1994
- Ingvar Carlsson (first elected 1965) 1994–1996
- Börje Nilsson (first elected 1965) 1996–1998
- Jan Bergqvist (first elected 1969) 1998–2002
- Anders Björck (first elected 1969) 2002–2003
- Bo Lundgren (first elected 1976) 2003–2004
- Lennart Nilsson (first elected 1976) 2004–2006
- Per Westerberg (first elected 1979) 2006–2014
- Göran Hägglund (first elected 1991) 2014–2015
- Krister Örnfjäder (first elected 1993) 2015–2018
- Beatrice Ask (first elected 1988) 2018–2019
- Tuve Skånberg (first elected 1991) 2020–2022
- Carina Ohlsson (first elected 1998) 2022
- Karin Enström (first elected 1998) 2022
- Tomas Eneroth (first elected 1994) 2022–2025
- Anders Ygeman (first elected 1996) 2025–

== Ukraine ==
According to article 82 of the Constitution of Ukraine, the oldest deputy opens the first session of each new convocation of the Verkhovna Rada. The deputy also reads aloud the oath. As the constitution was adopted in 1996, the rule was first applied to the opening of the third convocation.

| Convocation | Elected | Name | Party | Age when elected | Left Parliament |
|---|---|---|---|---|---|
| III | 1998 | Slava Stetsko | KUN | 77 | 2003 † |
| IV | 2002 | Slava Stetsko | KUN | 81 | 2003 † |
| V | 2006 | Ivan Gerasymov | KPU | 84 | 2008 † |
| VI | 2007 | Ivan Gerasymov | KPU | 86 | 2008 † |
| VII | 2012 | Yukhym Zvyahilsky | Party of Regions | 79 | 2019 |
| VIII | 2014 | Yukhym Zvyahilsky | Party of Regions | 81 | 2019 |
| IX | 2019 | Yuliy Ioffe | Opposition Platform | 78 | |
| IX | 2019 | Yuliy Ioffe | PZZhM | 78 | |

== United States ==
In the United States, the title "Father" of the House (although used for about a century starting in 1816) does not exist, but in the lower house, the House of Representatives the position known as Dean of the House is almost exactly the same position—that is, it is a largely ceremonial position bestowed on the member with the longest continuous service. Much like the Father of the British House of Commons, the Dean's only formal role relates to the installation of the Speaker, though in the American case it is to swear the newly elected speaker in rather than preside over the election. Less similar is the position in the Senate (the upper house) known as President Pro Tempore, the holder of which has since 1945 gained the position through seniority, but who also must be a member of the party holding a majority in the Senate.

Since March 2022, with the death of Don Young, the Dean of the House has been Hal Rogers, who was elected to the House of Representatives in 1980 and began serving in 1981.

== See also ==
- Oldest Member (European Parliament)
- Baby of the House
- Dean of the House (Canada)
- Dean of the U.S. House of Representatives
- Father of the Dáil
- List of longest-serving members of the Australian House of Representatives
- President pro tempore of the United States Senate
- Senior Marshal (Poland)
