= President of the National Assembly of Serbia =

Presiding officer of the National Assembly of Serbia

- Председник Народне скупштине Србије; Predsednik Narodne skupštine Srbije
- Standard of the President of the National Assembly

- Incumbent; Aleksandar Čupić since 19 November 2026
- Legislative branch; Head of the legislature; Secretariat-General of the National Assembly
- Style: Mister/Madam President (informal); His/Her Excellency (diplomatic)
- Type: Speaker
- Residence: No official residence
- Seat: House of the National Assembly, Nikola Pašić Square 13, Belgrade, Serbia
- Nominator: At least 30 deputies in the National Assembly
- Appointer: National Assembly
- Term length: Four years
- Inaugural holder: Miša Anastasijević
- Formation: 30 November 1858; 167 years ago
- Salary: din. 211,000 / €1,800 monthly

The president of the National Assembly (Serbian: Председник Народне скупштине, romanized: Predsednik Narodne skupštine), formally the president of the National Assembly of the Republic of Serbia (Serbian: Председник Народне скупштине Републике Србије, romanized: Predsednik Narodne skupštine Republike Srbije), is the presiding officer of the National Assembly of Serbia. The president represents the National Assembly and is elected by members of each new assembly for a term lasting four years.

The president of the National Assembly serves as acting president of Serbia if the elected president vacates the office before the expiration of the five-year presidential term due to death, resignation or removal from office.

The office has been held by Aleksandar Čupić, elected on the Student List, since 19 November 2026, when the 15th National Assembly elected him at its constitutive sitting with a 140–97 vote, defeating Stojan Radenović of the Serbian Progressive Party. The term of his predecessor, Ana Brnabić, had ended on 17 November, when the mandates of the new deputies were confirmed; until the election, the sitting was chaired by the oldest deputy, Radenović, and during the vote by Nada Macura, as Radenović was a candidate. As president of the Assembly, Čupić is also acting president of Serbia, an office vacant since Aleksandar Vučić resigned in September 2026.

== Duties and competences ==
According to Article 104 of the Constitution of Serbia:

- The National Assembly, by a majority vote of all deputies, elects the president and one or more vice presidents of the National Assembly.
- President of the National Assembly represents the National Assembly, convenes its meetings, presides over them, and performs other duties stipulated by the Constitution, laws, and the Rules of procedure of the National Assembly.

== List of presidents ==
Denotes acting head of the parliament

=== Principality of Serbia ===
National Assembly	Portrait	President	Term
Saint Andrew's Day Assembly		Miša Anastasijević	30 November 1858 – 31 January 1859
Nativity of Virgin Mary Assembly		Živko Karabiberović	8 September 1859 – 24 September 1859
Transfiguration Day Extraordinary Assembly		Todor Tucaković	6 August 1861 – 10 August 1861
Transfiguration Day Extraordinary Assembly		Mijalko Radenković	10 August 1861 – 20 August 1861
Assumption Day Assembly		Mijalko Radenković	16 August 1864 – 6 September 1864
Michaelmas Assembly		Živko Karabiberović	29 September 1867 – 13 October 1867
Great National Assembly		Živko Karabiberović	20 June 1868
Great Constitutional Assembly		Živko Karabiberović	10 June 1869 – 29 June 1869
National Assembly		Živko Karabiberović	14 September 1870 – 25 October 1870
Regular legislature		Živko Karabiberović	5 September 1871 – 24 October 1871
Regular legislature		Živko Karabiberović	24 September 1872 – 25 October 1872
Regular legislature		Živko Karabiberović	15 November 1873 – 31 December 1873
Extraordinary legislature		Dimitrije Jovanović	2 January 1874 – 27 January 1874
Regular legislature		Đorđe Topuzović	8 November 1874 – 13 March 1875
Regular legislature		Ljubomir Kaljević	15 August 1875 – 30 September 1875
Regular legislature		Dimitrije Jovanović	30 September 1875 – 21 January 1876
Great National Assembly		Đorđe Topuzović	14 February 1877 – 16 February 1877
Regular legislature		Dimitrije Jovanović	19 June 1877 – 24 July 1877
Regular legislature		Dimitrije Matić	24 June 1878 – 15 July 1878
Regular legislature		Todor Tucaković	21 November 1878 – 20 January 1879
Regular legislature		Todor Tucaković	1 November 1879 – 3 February 1880
Extraordinary legislature		Vuja Vasić	11 May 1880 – 24 May 1880
Regular legislature		Aleksa Popović	30 December 1880 – 22 May 1881
Regular legislature		Aleksa Popović	7 January 1882 – 22 June 1882

=== Kingdom of Serbia ===
National Assembly	Portrait	President	Term
Regular legislature		Milan Kujundžić Aberdar	25 November 1882 – 31 December 1882
Extraordinary legislature		Milan Kujundžić Aberdar	25 November 1882 – 31 December 1882
Extraordinary legislature		Sima Nestorović	15 September 1883 – 22 September 1883
Regular legislature		Milan Kujundžić Aberdar	6 May 1884 – 16 June 1884
Regular legislature		Đorđe Pavlović	3 April 1885 – 23 April 1885
Extraordinary legislature		Milan Kujundžić Aberdar	19 September 1885 – 23 September 1885
Extraordinary legislature		Đorđe Pavlović	30 June 1886 – 13 July 1886
Regular legislature		Đorđe Pavlović	15 July 1886 – 25 July 1886
Regular legislature		Đorđe Pavlović	5 October 1886 – 2 November 1886
Regular legislature		Todor Tucaković	15 November 1887 – 11 January 1888
Regular legislature		Rista Popović	16 March 1888 – 16 April 1888
Great (Constituent) Assembly		Kosta Taušanović	11 December 1888 – 22 December 1888
National Assembly; Extraordinary legislature		Nikola Pašić	1 October 1889 – 18 April 1890
Regular legislature		Nikola Pašić	1 November 1890 – 11 February 1891
Regular legislature		Dimitrije Katić	11 February 1891 – 31 March 1891
Regular legislature		Dimitrije Katić	28 December 1891 – 13 February 1892
Regular legislature		Pavle Vuković	13 February 1892 – 31 March 1892
National Assembly		Živan Živanović	29 March 1893 – 1 April 1893
Extraordinary legislature		Nikola Pašić	1 June 1893 – 9 August 1893
Regular legislature		Nikola Pašić	1 November 1893 – 12 January 1894
Regular legislature		Svetomir Nikolajević	10 April 1895 – 26 April 1895
Extraordinary legislature		Milutin Garašanin	24 June 1895 – 10 July 1895
Regular legislature		Milutin Garašanin	12 November 1895 – 8 February 1896
Regular legislature		Milutin Garašanin	5 October 1896 – 19 December 1896
Extraordinary legislature		Nikola Pašić	29 June 1897 – 12 July 1897
Regular legislature		Sima Nestorović	17 June 1898 – 15 July 1898
Extraordinary legislature		Sima Nestorović	16 July 1898 – 11 January 1899
Regular legislature		Sima Nestorović	20 September 1899 – 29 January 1900
Regular legislature		Sima Nestorović	29 December 1900 – 31 December 1900
Extraordinary legislature		Sima Nestorović	1 January 1901 – 29 January 1901
People's Representative Body (Senate and National Assembly); Regular legislature		Rista Popović (National Assembly) Dimitrije Marinković (Senate)	1 October 1901 – 11 May 1902
People's Representative Body (Senate and National Assembly); Regular legislature		Rista Popović (National Assembly) Dimitrije Marinković (Senate)	11 July 1902 – 25 July 1902
People's Representative Body (Senate and National Assembly); Extraordinary legislature		Aca Stanojević (National Assembly) Petar Velimirović (Senate)	2 June 1903 – 17 June 1903
National Assembly; Extraordinary legislature		Aca Stanojević	16 September 1903 – 30 September 1903
Regular legislature		Aca Stanojević	1 October 1903 – 25 March 1904
Regular legislature		Aca Stanojević	1 November 1904 – 3 March 1905
Extraordinary legislature		Ignjat Lukić	8 May 1905 – 17 May 1905
Extraordinary legislature		Ljubomir Davidović	25 July 1905 – 5 August 1905
Regular legislature		Nikola Nikolić	1 October 1905 – 19 April 1906
Extraordinary legislature		Aca Stanojević	25 June 1906 – 22 July 1906
Regular legislature		Mihailo A. Popović	1 October 1906 – 22 March 1907
Regular legislature		Milenko Vesnić	22 March 1907 – 7 July 1907
Regular legislature		Ljubomir Jovanović	1 October 1907 – 31 March 1908
Extraordinary legislature		Stanojlo Vukčević	5 June 1908 – 7 August 1908
Extraordinary legislature		Ljubomir Jovanović	27 September 1908 – 30 September 1908
Regular legislature		Ljubomir Jovanović	1 October 1908 – 20 April 1909
Regular legislature		Andra Nikolić	1 October 1909 – 12 June 1910
Regular legislature		Andra Nikolić	1 October 1910 – 19 May 1911
Regular legislature		Andra Nikolić	1 October 1911 – 1 February 1912
Extraordinary legislature		Andra Nikolić	19 April 1912 – 30 June 1912
Extraordinary legislature		Andra Nikolić	20 September 1912 – 30 September 1912
Regular legislature		Andra Nikolić	1 October 1912 – 30 September 1913
Regular legislature		Andra Nikolić	1 October 1913 – 19 June 1914
Extraordinary legislature		Andra Nikolić	14 July 1914 – October 1915
National Assembly (In exile on Corfu, Greece)		Andra Nikolić	28 August 1916 – 9 October 1916
National Assembly (In exile on Corfu, Greece)		Đoka Bračinac	12 February 1918 – 14 April 1918
National Assembly		Đoka Bračinac	14 December 1918 – 21 December 1918

=== People's Republic of Serbia / Socialist Republic of Serbia ===
Political party: KPS / SKS

No.	Portrait	Name (Birth–Death)	Term of office			Political party	Convocation	Election
No.	Portrait	Name (Birth–Death)	Took office	Left office	Time in office	Political party	Convocation	Election
President of the Presidency of the National Assembly
1		Siniša Stanković; Синиша Станковић (1892–1974)	April 1945	November 1946	1 year, 7 months	Communist Party of Serbia	(Note: See the Anti-fascist Assembly for the National Liberation of Serbia.)	
2		Aćim Grulović; Аћим Груловић (1898–1948)	November 1946	December 1948	2 years, 1 month	Communist Party of Serbia	1st (1946–51)	1946
3		Isa Jovanović; Иса Јовановић (1906–1983)	December 1948	September 1953	4 years, 9 months	Communist Party of Serbia renamed in 1952 to League of Communists of Serbia	1st (1946–51)	1946
3		Isa Jovanović; Иса Јовановић (1906–1983)	December 1948	September 1953	4 years, 9 months	Communist Party of Serbia renamed in 1952 to League of Communists of Serbia	2nd (1951–53)	1951
President of the National Assembly
4		Petar Stambolić; Петар Стамболић (1912–2007)	December 1953	1957	4 years	League of Communists of Serbia	3rd (1953–57)	1953
5		Jovan Veselinov; Јован Веселинов (1906–1982)	1957	April 1963	6 years	League of Communists of Serbia	4th (1957–63)	1957
President of the Assembly
6		Dušan Petrović; Душан Петровић (1914–1977)	June 1963	May 1967	3 years, 11 months	League of Communists of Serbia	5th (1963–65)	1963
6		Dušan Petrović; Душан Петровић (1914–1977)	June 1963	May 1967	3 years, 11 months	League of Communists of Serbia	6th (1965–67)	1965
7		Miloš Minić; Милош Минић (1914–2003)	May 1967	May 1969	2 years	League of Communists of Serbia	7th (1967–69)	1967
8		Dragoslav Marković; Драгослав Марковић (1920–2005)	May 1969	May 1974	5 years	League of Communists of Serbia	8th (1969–74)	1969
9		Živan Vasiljević; Живан Васиљевић (1920–2007)	May 1974	May 1978	4 years	League of Communists of Serbia	9th (1974–78)	1974
10		Dušan Čkrebić; Душан Чкребић (1927–2022)	May 1978	May 1982	4 years	League of Communists of Serbia	10th (1978–82)	1978
11		Branko Pešić; Бранко Пешић (1922–1986)	May 1982	1984	2 years	League of Communists of Serbia	11th (1982–86)	1982
12		Slobodan Gligorijević; Слободан Глигоријевић (1920–1999)	1984	May 1986	2 years	League of Communists of Serbia	11th (1982–86)	1982
13		Branislav Ikonić; Бранислав Иконић (1928–2002)	6 May 1986	6 May 1988	2 years	League of Communists of Serbia	12th (1986–89)	1986
14		Borisav Jović; Борисав Јовић (1928–2021)	6 May 1988	8 May 1989	1 year, 2 days	League of Communists of Serbia	12th (1986–89)	1986
15		Zoran Sokolović; Зоран Соколовић (1938–2001)	8 May 1989	31 December 1990	1 year, 237 days	League of Communists of Serbia	13th (1989–91)	1989

=== Republic of Serbia ===
Political party: SPS DSS GSS SPO G17 Plus SRS DS SNS SL

No.	Portrait	Name (Birth–Death)	Term of office			Political party	Convocation	Election
No.	Portrait	Name (Birth–Death)	Took office	Left office	Time in office	Political party	Convocation	Election
President of the National Assembly
1 (16)		Slobodan Unković; Слободан Унковић (born 1938)	11 January 1991	5 June 1991	145 days	Socialist Party of Serbia	1st (1991–93)	1990
2 (17)		Aleksandar Bakočević; Александар Бакочевић (1928–2007)	5 June 1991	25 January 1993	1 year, 234 days	Socialist Party of Serbia	1st (1991–93)	1990
3 (18)		Zoran Lilić; Зоран Лилић (born 1953)	25 January 1993	29 June 1993	155 days	Socialist Party of Serbia	2nd (1993–94)	1992
4 (19)		Zoran Aranđelović; Зоран Аранђеловић (born 1948)	29 June 1993	24 January 1994	209 days	Socialist Party of Serbia	2nd (1993–94)	1992
5 (20)		Dragan Tomić; Драган Томић (1935–2022)	1 February 1994	22 January 2001	6 years, 356 days	Socialist Party of Serbia	3rd (1994–97)	1993
5 (20)		Dragan Tomić; Драган Томић (1935–2022)	1 February 1994	22 January 2001	6 years, 356 days	Socialist Party of Serbia	4th (1997–2001)	1997
6 (21)		Dragan Maršićanin; Драган Маршићанин (born 1950)	22 January 2001	6 December 2001	318 days	Democratic Party of Serbia (DOS)	5th (2001–04)	2000
7 (22)		Nataša Mićić; Наташа Мићић (born 1965) (Note: First woman to hold this office.)	6 December 2001	27 January 2004	2 years, 52 days	Civic Alliance of Serbia (DOS)	5th (2001–04)	2000
8 (23)		Dragan Maršićanin; Драган Маршићанин (born 1950)	4 February 2004	3 March 2004	28 days	Democratic Party of Serbia	6th (2004–07)	2003
—		Vojislav Mihailović; Војислав Михаиловић (born 1951)	3 March 2004	4 March 2004	1 day	Serbian Renewal Movement	6th (2004–07)	2003
9 (24)		Predrag Marković; Предраг Марковић (born 1955)	4 March 2004	14 February 2007	2 years, 347 days	G17 Plus	6th (2004–07)	2003
10 (25)		Tomislav Nikolić; Томислав Николић (born 1952)	8 May 2007	13 May 2007	5 days	Serbian Radical Party	7th (2007–08)	2007
—		Milutin Mrkonjić; Милутин Мркоњић (1942–2021)	13 May 2007	23 May 2007	10 days	Socialist Party of Serbia	7th (2007–08)	2007
11 (26)		Oliver Dulić; Оливер Дулић (born 1975)	23 May 2007	11 June 2008	1 year, 19 days	Democratic Party	7th (2007–08)	2007
12 (27)		Slavica Đukić Dejanović; Славица Ђукић Дејановић (born 1951)	25 June 2008	31 May 2012	3 years, 341 days	Socialist Party of Serbia	8th (2008–12)	2008
13 (28)		Nebojša Stefanović; Небојша Стефановић (born 1976)	23 July 2012	16 April 2014	1 year, 267 days	Serbian Progressive Party	9th (2012–14)	2012
14 (29)		Maja Gojković; Маја Гојковић (born 1963)	23 April 2014	3 August 2020	6 years, 102 days	Serbian Progressive Party	10th (2014–16)	2014
14 (29)		Maja Gojković; Маја Гојковић (born 1963)	23 April 2014	3 August 2020	6 years, 102 days	Serbian Progressive Party	11th (2016–20)	2016
15 (30)		Ivica Dačić; Ивица Дачић (born 1966)	22 October 2020	1 August 2022	1 year, 283 days	Socialist Party of Serbia	12th (2020–22)	2020
16 (31)		Vladimir Orlić; Владимир Орлић (born 1983)	2 August 2022	6 February 2024	1 year, 188 days	Serbian Progressive Party	13th (2022–24)	2022
17 (32)		Ana Brnabić; Ана Брнабић (born 1975) (Note: First openly gay person to hold this office.)	20 March 2024	17 November 2026 (Note: Brnabić's term ended when the mandates of the deputies of the 15th National Assembly were confirmed on 17 November 2026. The office was vacant until Čupić was elected on 19 November, while the constitutive sitting was chaired by the oldest deputy.)	2 years, 242 days	Serbian Progressive Party	14th (2024–26)	2023
18 (33)		Aleksandar Čupić; Александар Чупић (born 1978)	19 November 2026	Incumbent	3 days	Independent (Student List)	15th (2026–present)	2026

== Fathers of the House ==
Traditionally, the first sitting of a newly elected assembly is chaired by the oldest deputy, a role similar to the father of the house in common-law countries. The oldest deputy presides over the first sitting until the new president of the National Assembly is elected.

The following deputies have served in this role since the 1990 parliamentary election:

Year	Name (Birth–Death)	Portrait	Political party
1991	Batrić Jovanović (1922–2011)		Socialist Party of Serbia
1993	Vojislav Dimitrijević (1915–1995)		Serbian Radical Party
1994	Vojislav Dimitrijević (1915–1995)		Serbian Radical Party
1997	Jovan Krkobabić (Note: Mihály Szecsei of the Alliance of Vojvodina Hungarians was the oldest member of the parliament elected in 1997, but he was unable to attend its inaugural session due to an injury from a recent traffic accident. Krkobabić, as the next oldest representative, served in his place.) (1930–2014)		Socialist Party of Serbia
2001	Zaharije Trnavčević (1926–2016)		Democratic Party
2004	Velimir Simonović (1928–2016)		Democratic Party of Serbia
2007	Borka Vučić (1926–2009)		Socialist Party of Serbia
2008	Jovan Krkobabić (1930–2014)		Party of United Pensioners of Serbia
2012	Zaharije Trnavčević (1926–2016)		Rich Serbia
2014	Milan Korać (1929–2015)		Party of United Pensioners of Serbia
2016	Dragoljub Mićunović (1930–2026)		Democratic Party
2020	Smilja Tišma (born c. 1929)		Independent
2022	Vladeta Janković (born 1940)		Independent
2024	Stojan Radenović (born 1948)		Independent
2026 (Note: On 19 November 2026, Radenović handed the chair to Nada Macura, the next-oldest deputy, for the vote on the president of the Assembly, in which he was a candidate.)	Stojan Radenović (born 1948)		Independent

== See also ==
- President of Serbia
- Prime Minister of Serbia
