= Dušan Petrović Šane =

Yugoslav communist soldier and politician

- Душан Петровић Шане
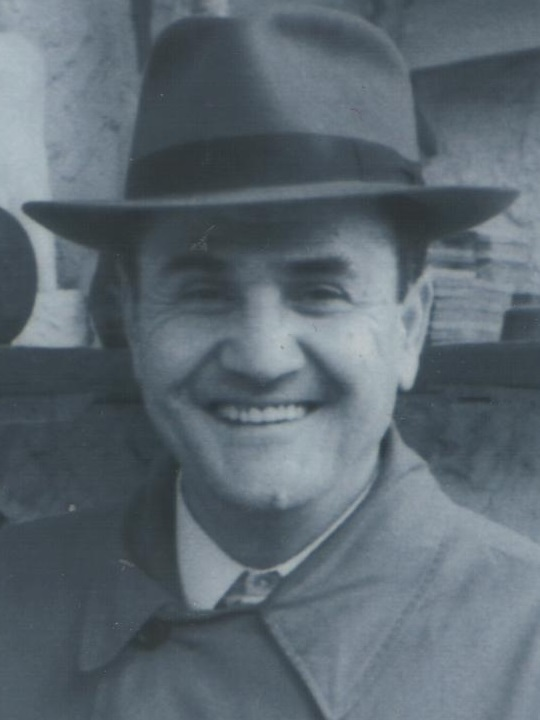
- Petrović in 1965

President of the Assembly of SR Serbia
- In office 26 June 1963 – 6 May 1967
- Preceded by: Jovan Veselinov
- Succeeded by: Miloš Minić

Personal details
- Born: 28 June 1914 Kragujevac, Kingdom of Serbia
- Died: 21 June 1977 (aged 62) Belgrade, SR Serbia, SFR Yugoslavia
- Party: Communist Party of Yugoslavia

Dušan Petrović Šane (Serbian Cyrillic: Душан Петровић Шане; 28 June 1914 – 21 June 1977) was a Yugoslav communist soldier and politician who served as President of Assembly of the Socialist Republic of Serbia from 1963 to 1967.

A Partisan officer from World War II, Petrović was also a Hero of Socialist Labour and a People's Hero of Yugoslavia.

== Sources ==
- Da Graca, John V. Heads of State and Government. MacMillan Press, 1985.
