= Đorđe Đukić =

Đorđe Đukić may refer to:

- Đorđe Đukić (Vojvodina politician) (born 1948), former president of the executive council of Vojvodina
- Đorđe Đukić (economist) (born 1952), Serbian economist and former politician
- Đorđe Đukić (Army of Republika Srpska) (1934–1996), Lt. General in the Bosnian Serb army
