= Jovan Veselinov =

Serbian politician

Jovan Veselinov Јован Веселинов
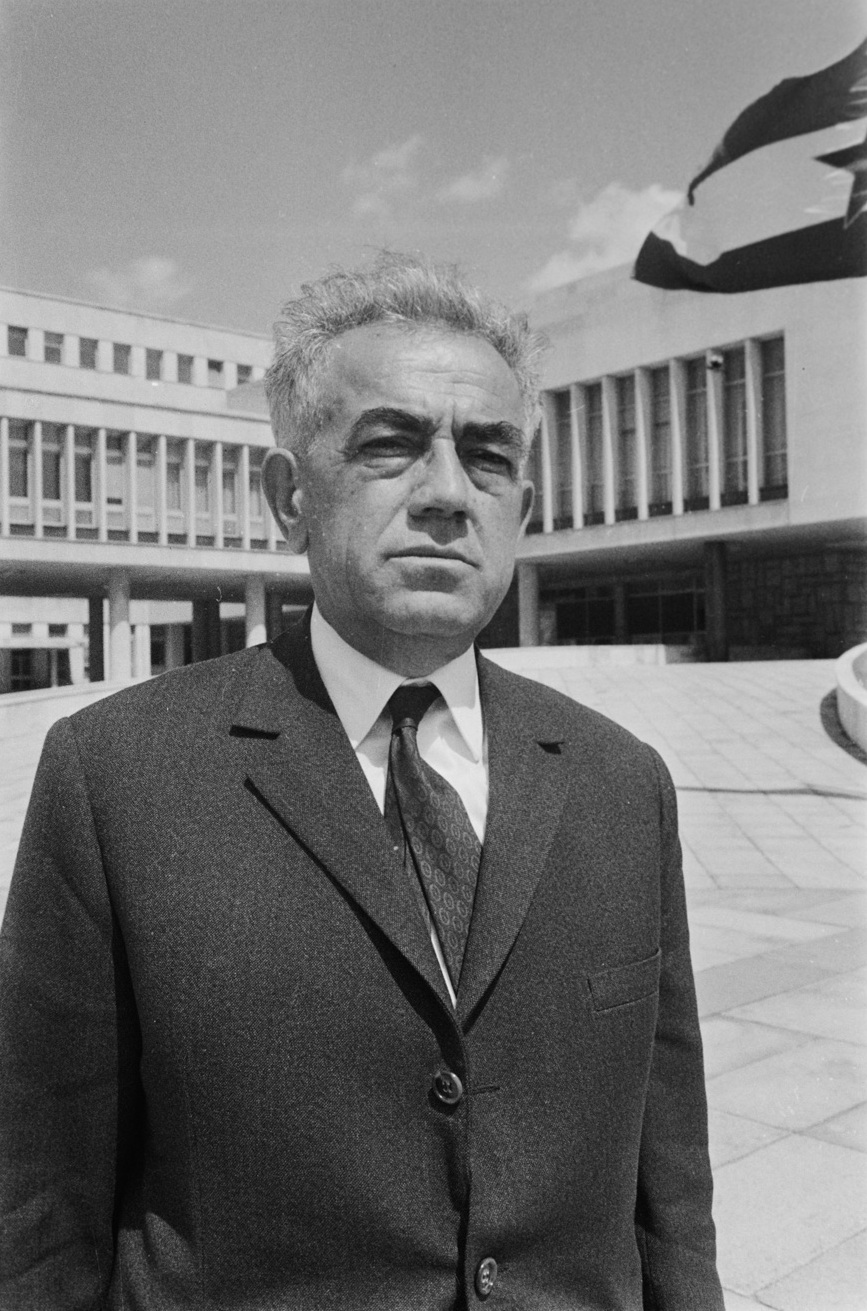

President of the People's Assembly of the People's Republic of Serbia
- In office April 1957 – 26 June 1963
- Prime Minister: Miloš Minić; Slobodan Penezić
- Preceded by: Petar Stambolić
- Succeeded by: Dušan Petrović

49th Prime Minister of Serbia As President of the Executive Council of PR Serbia
- In office December 1953 – April 1957
- President: Petar Stambolić
- Preceded by: Petar Stambolić
- Succeeded by: Miloš Minić

3rd Secretary of the League of Communists of Serbia
- In office April 1957 – 6 November 1966
- Preceded by: Petar Stambolić
- Succeeded by: Dobrivoje Radosavljević

Personal details
- Born: 20 January 1906 Kumane, Austria-Hungary
- Died: 8 February 1982 (aged 76) Belgrade, SR Serbia, SFR Yugoslavia
- Party: League of Communists of Yugoslavia (SKJ)
- Nickname: Žarko

Jovan Veselinov Žarko (20 January 1906 in Kumane – 8 February 1982 in Belgrade) was a Serbian communist politician. He served as President of the People's Assembly of the People's Republic of Serbia (head of state), President of the Executive Council of the People's Republic of Serbia (prime minister) and Secretary of the League of Communists of Serbia (party chief). He was a Partisan fighter in World War II, and was proclaimed People's Hero of Yugoslavia.

== A hunting accident ==
Economist and politician Edvard Kardelj was shot and wounded on a hunting trip in 1959 by Veselinov. Although the official police investigation concluded that Veselinov had been shooting at a wild boar and a ricochet from a rock struck Kardelj, it was suggested at the time that the assassination attempt was orchestrated by his political rival Aleksandar Ranković or Ranković's ally Slobodan Penezić.
