= Oldest Member =

Oldest Member may refer to:

- Oldest Member (European Parliament), the eldest Member of European Parliament.
- Oldest Member (character), an anonymous character in short stories by P. G. Wodehouse.
