= Petar Stambolić =

Yugoslav communist politician (1912–2007)

- Петар Стамболић
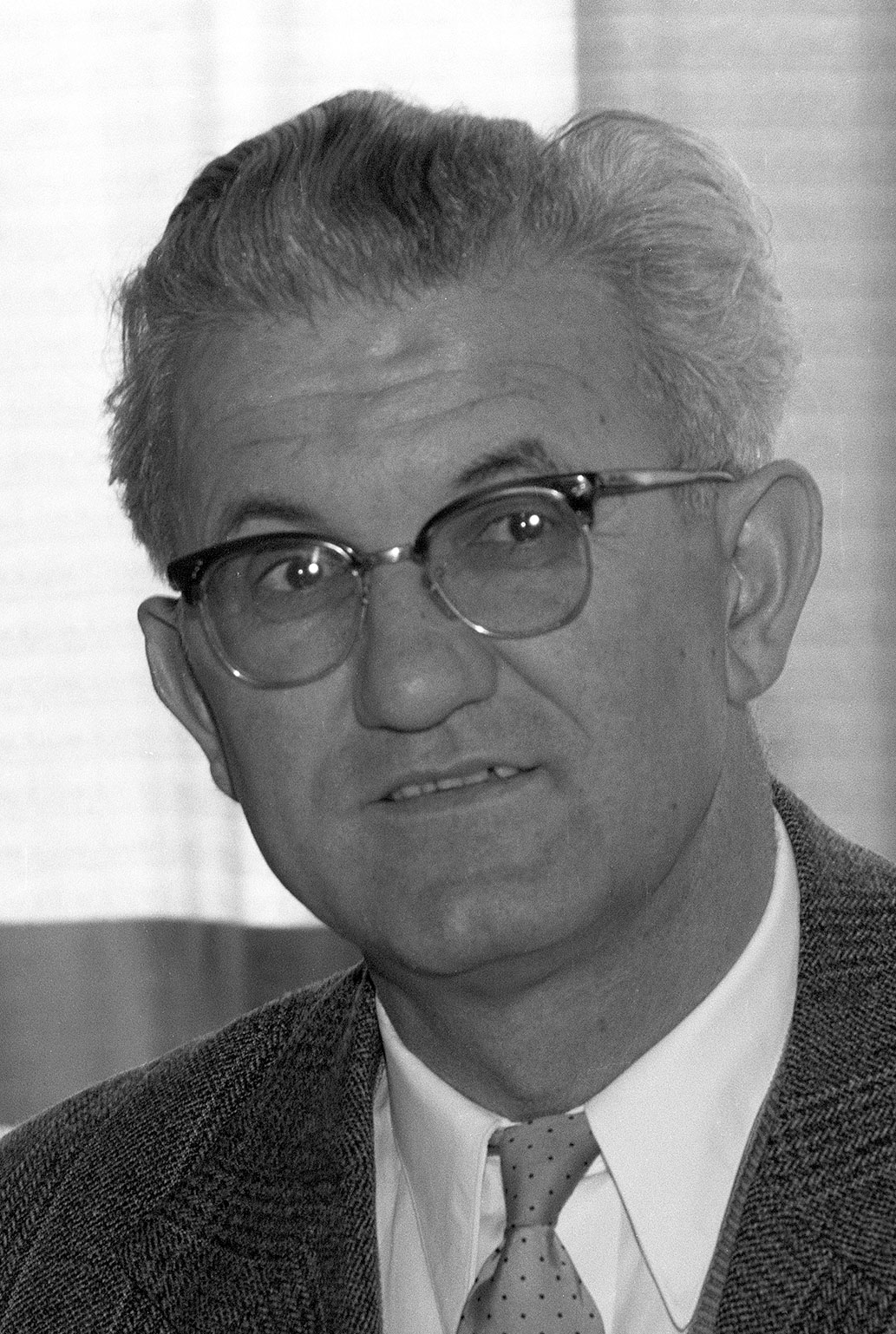
- Stambolić in 1958

4th President of the Presidency of Yugoslavia
- In office 15 May 1982 – 15 May 1983
- Prime Minister: Milka Planinc
- Preceded by: Sergej Kraigher
- Succeeded by: Mika Špiljak

20th Prime Minister of Yugoslavia President of the Federal Executive Council
- In office 29 June 1963 – 16 May 1967
- President: Josip Broz Tito
- Preceded by: Josip Broz Tito
- Succeeded by: Mika Špiljak

2nd Prime Minister of Serbia President of the People's Government
- In office 5 September 1948 – 16 December 1953
- President: Isa Jovanović
- Preceded by: Blagoje Nešković
- Succeeded by: Jovan Veselinov

President of the National Assembly of Serbia
- In office December 1953 – April 1957
- Prime Minister: Jovan Veselinov
- Preceded by: Isa Jovanović
- Succeeded by: Jovan Veselinov

2nd President of the League of Communists of Serbia
- In office 1948 – March 1957
- President: Siniša Stanković; Himself
- Prime Minister: Himself; Jovan Veselinov
- Preceded by: Blagoje Nešković
- Succeeded by: Jovan Veselinov
- In office February 1968 – November 1968
- President: Miloš Minić
- Prime Minister: Đurica Jokić
- Preceded by: Dobrivoje Radosavljević
- Succeeded by: Marko Nikezić

Personal details
- Born: 12 July 1912 Brezova, Ivanjica, Serbia
- Died: 21 September 2007 (aged 95) Belgrade, Serbia
- Party: League of Communists of Yugoslavia (SKJ)
- Spouse: Judita Alargić
- Relatives: Ivan Stambolić (nephew)

Petar Stambolić (Serbian: Петар Стамболић;Serbian pronunciation: [pětar stambǒliːt͡ɕ]; 12 July 1912 – 21 September 2007) was a Serbian communist politician who served as the President of the Federal Executive Council of Yugoslavia from 1963 to 1967 and as President of the Presidency from 1982 until 1983.

== Biography ==
Stambolić was born in Brezova, Ivanjica, Kingdom of Serbia. He graduated from the University of Belgrade Faculty of Agriculture.

He had a long career in the Serbian and Yugoslav communist parties. During the Second World War he was member of communist Partisan forces. His notable military engagements include the Partisan attack on Sjenica. His nephew was Serbian president Ivan Stambolić.

Stambolić served as president of the Central Committee of the Serbian Communist Party from 1948 to 1957. During that time he was prime minister of Serbia from 1948 to 1953 and then served as president of the National Assembly of Serbia until 1957 and President of the Federal Assembly of the Socialist Federal Republic of Yugoslavia from 26 March 1957 until 29 June 1963. He also served as the president of the federal executive council of Yugoslavia from 1963 to 1967, and President of the Presidency of Yugoslavia from 1982 to 1983.

He died in Belgrade, Serbia in 2007. He was married to the partisan Judita Alargić.

Political offices
Preceded by Sergej Kraigher	President of the Presidency of Yugoslavia; 15 May 1982 – 15 May 1983	Succeeded by Mika Špiljak
Preceded by Josip Broz Tito	Prime Minister of Yugoslavia; 29 June 1963 – 16 May 1967	Succeeded by Mika Špiljak
Preceded by Isa Jovanović as President of the Presidency of the National Assembly of Serbia	President of the National Assembly of Serbia; December 1953 – April 1957	Succeeded by Jovan Veselinov
Preceded by Blagoje Nešković as President of the People's Government of Serbia	President of the Executive Council of the People's Republic of Serbia; 5 September 1948 – 16 December 1953	Succeeded by Jovan Veselinov
Party political offices
Preceded by Blagoje Nešković	Secretary of the Central Committee of the League of Communists of Serbia; 1948 – March 1957	Succeeded by Jovan Veselinov
Preceded by Dobrivoje Radosavljević	President of the Central Committee of the League of Communists of Serbia; February 1968 – November 1968	Succeeded by Marko Nikezić
