= Relja Penezic =

Relja Penezić (born 1950) is a painter, media artist, printmaker, photographer, and a filmmaker. His work is a multimedia blend that combines technology and painting, performance and video, art and craft.

== Biography ==
Penezić was born in Belgrade, in the Yugoslavia in 1950 to parents Slobodan and Grozdana (née Belić). After studies of fine arts at the University of Belgrade, he relocated to Paris, France where he based his art practice from 1975 to 1980. In 1985 he immigrated to the United States. Until 1990 he was based in New York City and his art practice consisted mainly of painting and printmaking. He started experimenting with digital media, video and photography in 1991 when he moved to San Francisco where he lived until 2007. Today, Penezic lives and works in Los Angeles.

In 1996 Zakros InterArts label Chronic Art published his CD-ROM "Computer Film Sketchbook" and premiered it at the San Francisco International Film Festival. His 2002 Audio/Video installation in collaboration with composer Victoria Jordanova at the Los Angeles County Museum of Art entitled "Panopticon" was published by ArpaViva label as a DVD and is distributed by The Cinema Guild of New York. His paintings and media pieces are part of numerous private and public collections in the US, Europe and Japan. In 2004 he was selected to create a permanent site-specific media installation "The Alaska Cycle" by Alaska Arts Council. In 2005 and 2006 he finished two large-scale site-specific paintings "Alaska Time-Lapse" and "Views of Tundra" for the Alaska Psychiatric Institute, commissioned by Alaska Arts Council.

Penezic is a cofounder of ARTaVIVA, a company/curatorial project dedicated to the promotion of audio/video art as a permanent installation medium. In addition to an international career as an artist, he served as a Creative Director for ID8, Los Angeles based branding agency, an Art Director and a Designer for Jump Ship Studios, San Francisco, and a Designer/Visual Effects Artist for Fleet Street Pictures of San Francisco. Relja Penezic was also a Master Printmaker for John Nichols Printmakers of New York specializing in silk-screen and lithography limited editions. He was a lecturer at the Princeton University School of Architecture, Haverford College, and Bowling Green State University.
