= Ostřešany =

- Municipality
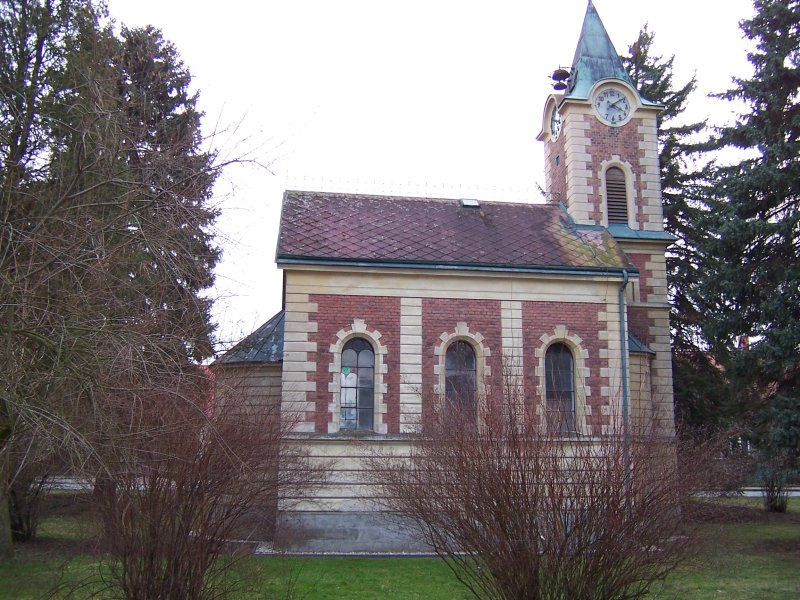
- Chapel in Ostřešany

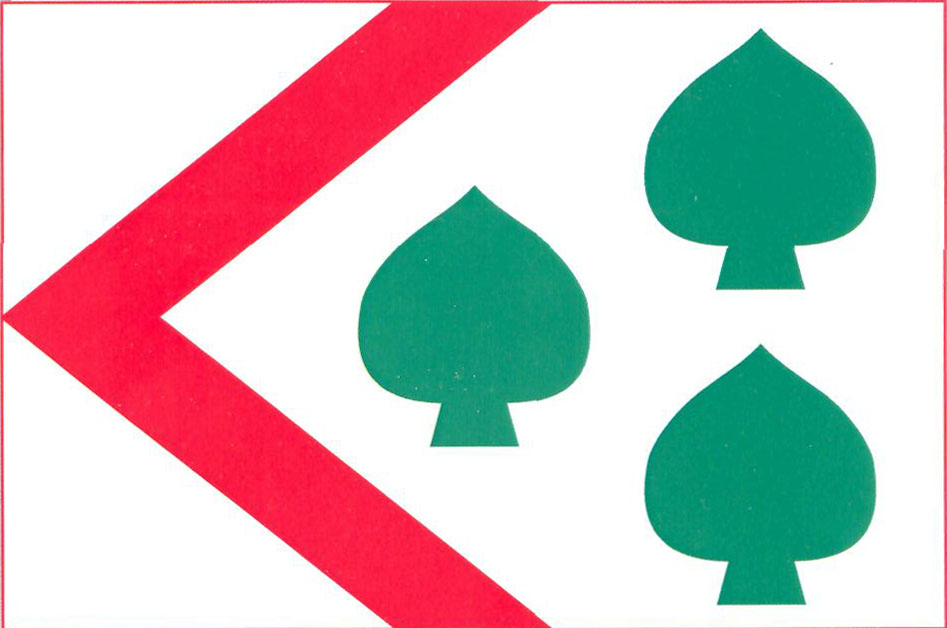
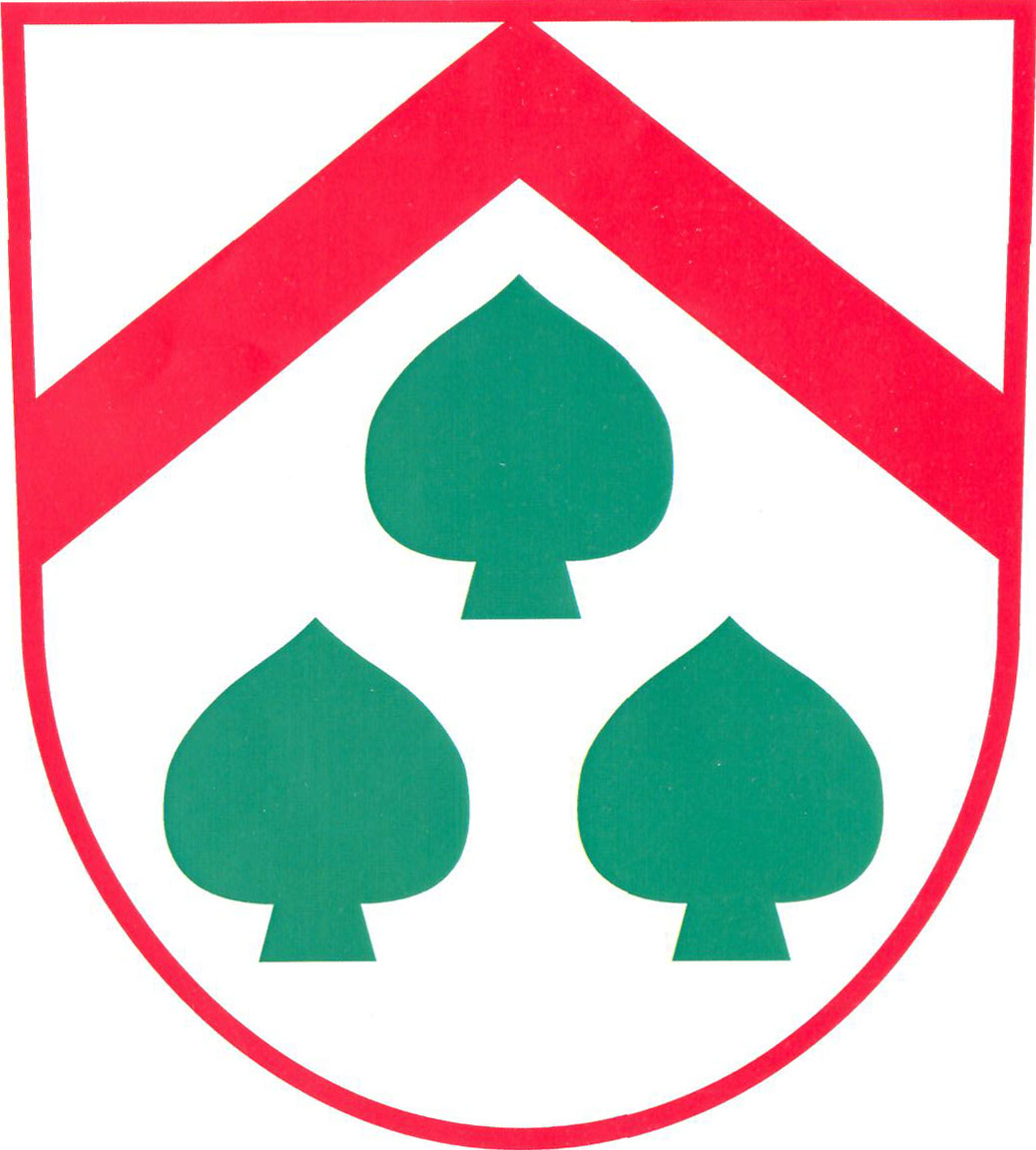
- Flag Coat of arms

- Location in the Czech Republic
- Coordinates: 49°59′36″N 15°48′19″E
- Country: Czech Republic
- Region: Pardubice
- District: Pardubice
- First mentioned: 1227

Area
  - Total: 6.64 km^{2} (2.56 sq mi)
- Elevation: 250 m (820 ft)

Population (2026-01-01)
  - Total: 1,134
  - Density: 171/km^{2} (442/sq mi)
- Time zone: UTC+1 (CET)
  - Summer (DST): UTC+2 (CEST)
- Postal code: 530 02
- Website: www.ostresany.cz

Ostřešany is a municipality and village in Pardubice District in the Pardubice Region of the Czech Republic. It has about 1,100 inhabitants.

== Demographics ==
Historical population
Year	Pop.	±%
1869	902	—
1880	943	+4.5%
1890	928	−1.6%
1900	952	+2.6%
1910	1,082	+13.7%
1921	1,020	−5.7%
1930	1,101	+7.9%
1950	975	−11.4%
1961	942	−3.4%
1970	922	−2.1%
1980	872	−5.4%
1991	850	−2.5%
2001	878	+3.3%
2011	990	+12.8%
2021	1,095	+10.6%
Source: Censuses

== Notable people ==
- Zdeněk Jičínský (1929–2020), lawyer and politician
