= Vojislav Dimitrijević =

Vojislav Dimitrijević (Serbian Cyrillic: Војислав Димитријевић; 1915 – 2 June 1995) was a Serbian veterinary doctor, professor, and politician. He served in the Serbian parliament from 1993 to 1995 and was also a member of the Yugoslavian parliament's Chamber of Republics from 1993 to 1994. Dimitrijević was a member of the far-right Serbian Radical Party (SRS).

== Private career ==
Dimitrijević received his doctorate in veterinary sciences from the University of Belgrade in 1954. He subsequently became director of the Veterinary Institute in Priština, in what was then the Autonomous Region of Kosovo and Metohija.

== Politician ==
=== First parliamentary term (1993–1994) ===
Dimitrijević appeared in the lead position on the Radical Party's electoral list for the Priština division in the 1992 Serbian parliamentary election and received a mandate when the list won five seats. (From 1992 to 2000, Serbia's electoral law stipulated that one-third of parliamentary mandates would be assigned to candidates from successful lists in numerical order, while the remaining two-thirds would be distributed amongst other candidates at the discretion of the sponsoring parties. Dimitrijević was automatically elected by virtue of his list position.) The Socialist Party of Serbia (SPS) won a plurality victory overall with 101 out of 250 seats and governed with informal support from the Radicals, who finished in second place with seventy-three seats.

As the oldest representative in the new parliament, Dimitrijević temporarily presided over the assembly in a "father of the house" role at its constitutive session in January 1993, pending the election of a new president. In so doing, he made a sign of the cross from the speaker's podium; observers noted that this was the first time someone had publicly crossed themselves in the assembly since World War II. An opinion piece in Borba subsequently described Dimitrijević as "a quiet and measured man," far removed from the stereotypical image of his party.

In the assembly, Dimitrijević served on the committee for science and technological development and the committee for agriculture, food industry, forestry, water management, and rural development. He was also chosen as a member of the Serbian parliament's delegation to the Federal Republic of Yugoslavia's Chamber of Republics – where, as the oldest member of that assembly, he also presided over its constitutive session.

=== Second parliamentary term (1994–1995) ===
The Socialist–Radical alliance broke down later in 1993, and a new Serbian parliamentary election was called for December of that year. Dimitrijević appeared in the second position on the Radical Party's list for Priština and was awarded the party's "optional" mandate after the list fell to two seats. The Socialists won a stronger plurality victory with 123 seats and later gained a parliamentary majority through an alliance with the small New Democracy (ND) party, while the Radicals fell to thirty-nine seats and served in opposition.

As the oldest representative, Dimitrijević once again presided over the national assembly on an interim basis when it convened in January 1994. On this occasion, he expressed hope that all Serbian lands would one day unite (Note: Dimitrijević made this comment against the backdrop of ongoing wars in Croatia and Bosnia, where the Republic of Serbian Krajina and Republika Srpska had come into being as unrecognized Serb quasi-states.) and remarked, "Lord, bless the work of the Serbian parliament." Due to delays in the election of a president, Dimitrijević served from 24 January to 1 February 1994 before Dragan Tomić of the Socialists was chosen for the role.

Dimitrijević once again served on the science and agriculture committees in his second national assembly term. He was not chosen for another term in the Chamber of Republics. During a parliamentary debate in April 1994, he objected to the filing of amendments in Latin script and asked that they be rewritten in Cyrillic.

== Death ==
Dimitrijević died on 2 June 1995. The national assembly paid tribute to him when it met on 12 July 1995.
