= Kumane, Novi Bečej =

Kumane Кумане (Serbian)
- Village (Selo)
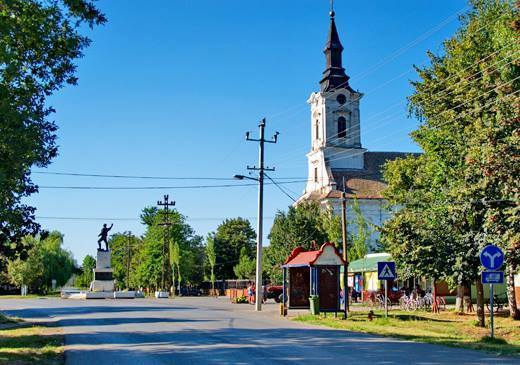
- Main street and the Orthodox Church

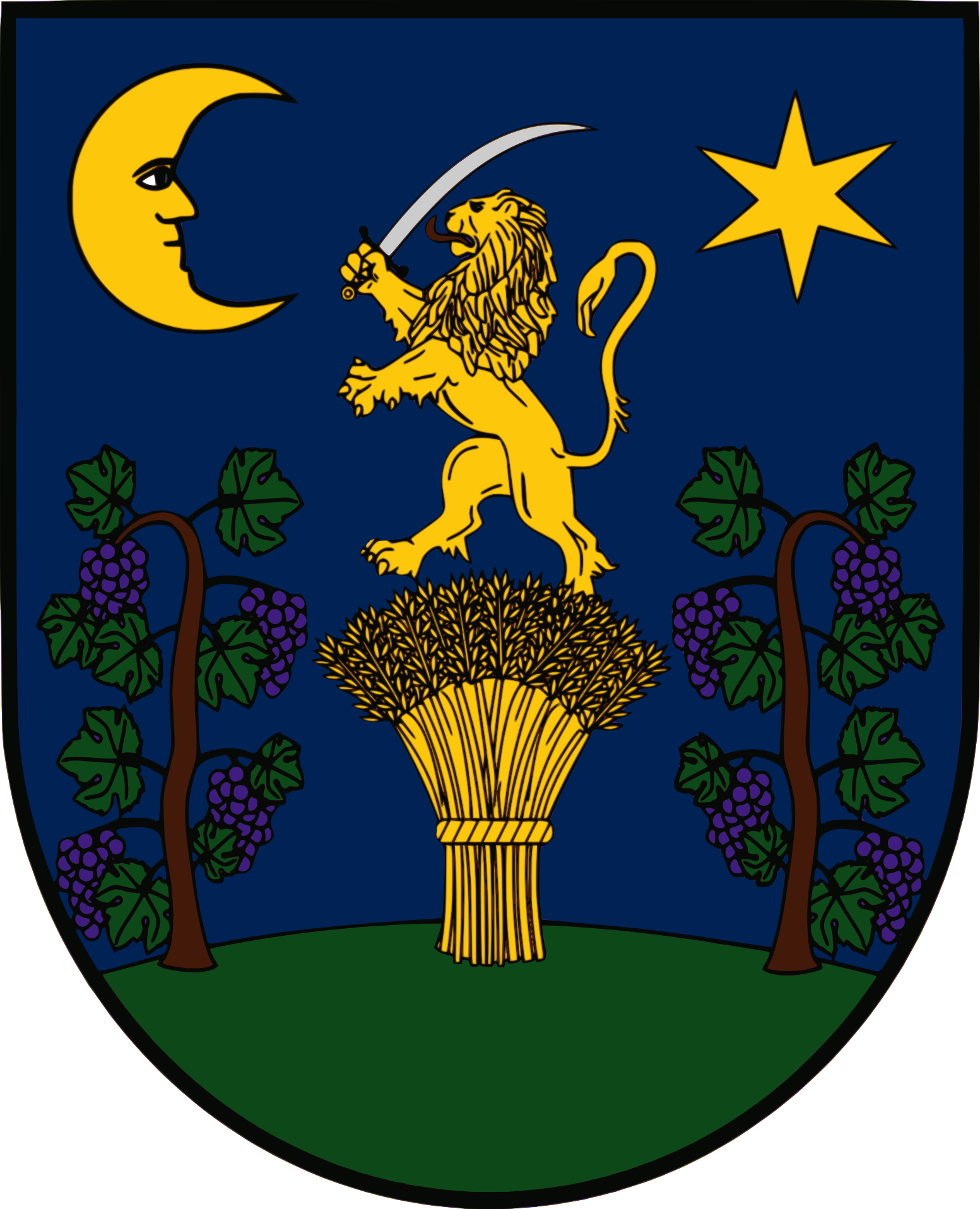
- Coat of arms

- Location of Kumane within Serbia Kumane (Serbia) Kumane (Europe)
- Coordinates: 45°32′12″N 20°13′25″E
- Country: Serbia
- Province: Vojvodina
- Municipalities: Novi Bečej
- Elevation: 80 m (260 ft)

Population (2011)
  - Kumane: 3,284
- Time zone: UTC+1 (CET)
  - Summer (DST): UTC+2 (CEST)
- Postal code: 23271
- Area code: +381(0)23
- Car plates: ZR

Kumane (Serbian Cyrillic: Кумане) is a village located in the Novi Bečej municipality, in the Central Banat District of Serbia. It is situated in the Autonomous Province of Vojvodina. The village has a Serb ethnic majority (86.41%) and its population numbering 3,814 people (2002 census).

== Name ==
In Serbian, the village is known as Kumane (Кумане), in Hungarian as Kumán, and in Croatian as Kumane.

== Historical population ==
- 1961: 5,233
- 1971: 4,778
- 1981: 4,321
- 1991: 4,068
- 2002: 3,814
- 2011: 3,284

== Notable residents ==
- Jovan Veselinov

== See also ==
- List of places in Serbia
- List of cities, towns and villages in Vojvodina
