= Vasilis Efraimidis =

Greek journalist, editor, and politician

- Βασίλης Εφραιμίδης
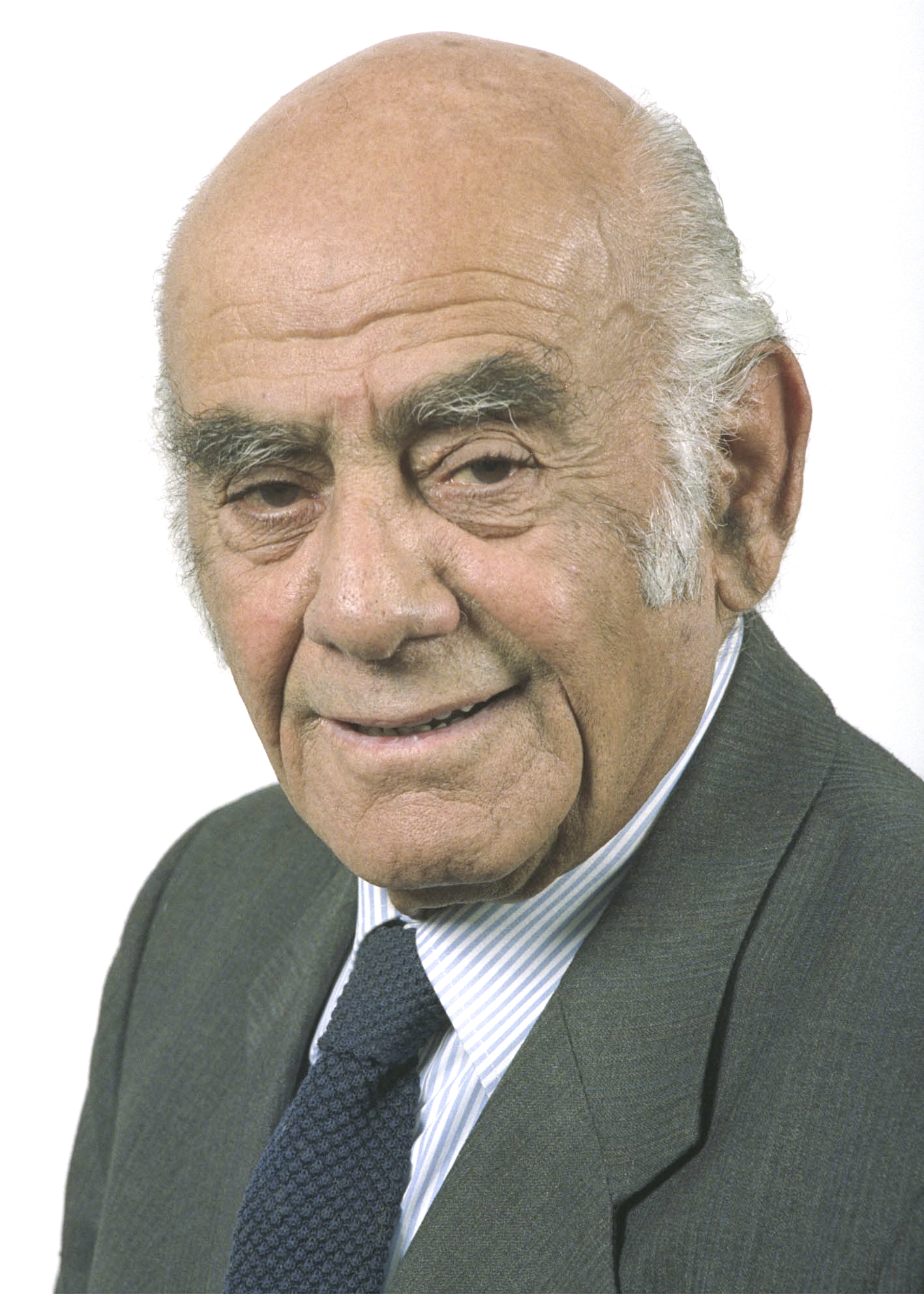
- Efraimidis in 1994

Member of the European Parliament for Greece
- In office 18 October 1981 – 20 July 1999

Personal details
- Born: 31 December 1915 Akdağmadeni, Ottoman Empire
- Died: 15 August 2000 (aged 84)
- Party: Communist Party of Greece
- Other political affiliations: United Democratic Left; Communist and Allies Group; Left Unity; GUE/NGL

Military service
- Allegiance: Greek resistance
- Branch/service: National Liberation Front
- Battles/wars: World War II; Axis occupation of Greece

Vasilis Efraimidis or Vassilis Ephremidis (Greek: Βασίλης Εφραιμίδης; 31 December 1915 – 15 August 2000) was a Greek journalist, editor and politician of the Communist Party of Greece (KKE).

== Biography ==
A refugee from Akdağmadeni, he moved to Athens as a child and studied law. He fought in World War II, and became part of EAM during the occupation, becoming the director its press department after the liberation, for which he was imprisoned in 1947. Released in 1951, from 1952 to 1956, Ephremidis was chief editor and director of the leftist newspaper I Avgi. He was elected to the Hellenic Parliament with EDA from his release until the outset of the military dictatorship, when he fled to Western Europe. From 1981 to 1999, he was a Member of European Parliament (MEP).

== Member of European Parliament ==
When in 1981 Greece became a member of the European Community, Efraimidis was elected a Member of the European Parliament in the first Greek European Parliament by-election. He was re-elected in 1984, 1989 and 1994.

In 1982 he was elected vice chair of the Communist and Allies Group, and kept his office while the parliamentary group in 1989 was renamed to Left Unity and in 1995 merged to today's European United Left–Nordic Green Left (GUE/NGL).

On 19 July 1994, aged 79, he was the second-oldest Member of the European Parliament. After Otto von Habsburg abstained from exercising his privilege, Efraimidis was entitled to preside over the chamber during the election of the new session's president. Following the controversy over far-right politician Claude Autant-Lara's 1989 opening speech, Efraimidis restricted himself to some reconciliatory opening words.

Efraimidis died on 15 August 2000.
