= Đorđe Đukić (economist) =

Serbian economist (born 1952)

Đorđe Đukić (Serbian Cyrillic: Ђорђе Ђукић; born 1952) is an economist, academic, and former politician in Serbia. He has been a professor at the University of Belgrade Faculty of Economics since 1996 and has published extensively in the field. He was previously a member of the Assembly of the Federal Republic of Yugoslavia from 1992 to 2000, serving as a member of the Socialist Party of Serbia (Socijalistička partija Srbije, SPS).

== Early life and academic career ==
Đukić was born in Aleksandrovac, in what was then the People's Republic of Serbia in the Federal People's Republic of Yugoslavia. He finished high school in Čačak, graduated from the University of Belgrade Faculty of Economics in 1975, earned a master's degree from the same institution in 1979, and received a Ph.D. from the University of Kragujevac Faculty of Economics in 1984. He became an assistant professor at the Faculty of Agriculture in Čačak in 1985, and was promoted to associate professor in 1990 and full professor in 1995.

In 1996, Đukić became a full professor at the University of Belgrade Faculty of Economics. He has taught banking theory at the master's level and monetary theory and policy at the doctoral level since 2006.

Đukić is a frequent commentator on economic matters in the Serbian media.

He was the winner of two Fulbright Scholarships within Fulbright Visiting Scholar Program, U.S.A.:

- Stanford University, department of economics, U.S.A. Academic 1988–1989.
- University of New Haven, Department of Economics and Finance, U.S.A. Academic 2001–2002.

He is a member of the Board of Economic Science of the Serbian Academy of Sciences and Arts.

== Politician ==
Đukić was elected to the Federal Assembly of Yugoslavia's Chamber of Citizens in the May 1992 Yugoslavian parliamentary election, winning in the Čačak electoral division. He was appointed to the Yugoslavian government's economic council in July 1992.

Yugoslavia adopted a system of full proportional representation later in 1992. Đukić received the second position on the SPS's electoral list for the Kragujevac division (which included Čačak) in the 1992–93 Yugoslavian parliamentary election and was re-elected when the list won five seats in the division. He was re-appointed to the economic council in June 1993. He was also appointed to the council of the National Bank of Yugoslavia in August 1993 and to the country's securities commission in 1994.

Đukić was elected to a third term in the Chamber of Citizens in the 1996 Yugoslavian parliamentary election. In December 1996, he was selected as president of the chamber's monetary committee. He cautioned the Yugoslavian government against taking on new financial responsibilities in March 1998, citing the risks of increased inflation; this occurred against the backdrop of parliament's decision to restructure debts in the agriculture and tourism sectors.

Although they were members of the same party, Đukić was a prominent opponent of Borka Vučić, the head of Beogradska Banka who was sometimes described as the "personal banker" of Slobodan Milošević. In July 1999, Đukić called for the National Bank of Yugoslavia to annul its decision to merge twenty-two banks in Serbia into Beogradska Banka. The merger had been ordered in the early period of the NATO bombing of Yugoslavia in March 1999; Đukić said that, with the conclusion of the conflict, it was "necessary to establish a legal situation based on ... regulations in place before the state of war was declared" and expressed concern that the planned merger would undermine the overall soundness of the country's banking sector. He also accused Vučić of attempting to shore up the resources of her larger, less financially secure banks with the assets of smaller ones. Media coverage from this period indicates that Đukić made these comments at considerable risk to his own position, given the importance of Vučić in supporting Milošević's regime.

In June 2000, Đukić criticized the Yugoslavian parliament's approval of legal amendments that granted the National Bank of Yugoslavia the right to initiate the receivership of insolvent companies. He argued that this approach was unknown in international practice and that initiating receivership should be the responsibility of the courts rather than the banking sector.

He was not re-elected in the 2000 Yugoslavian general election; online sources do not indicate if he was a candidate. He has not returned to political life since this time.

== Electoral record ==
=== Federal (Federal Republic of Yugoslavia) ===
May 1992 Yugoslavian Federal Election Chamber of Citizens: Čačak
Đorđe Đukić	Socialist Party of Serbia	30,354	36.67
Raško Bugarčić	Serbian Radical Party	21,740	26.26
Dragan Zarubica	Citizens' Group	8,797	10.63
Predrag Ružičić	Serb Democratic Party of Serbia	6,030	7.28
Milija Pantelić	Citizens' Group	3,779	4.57
Mihailo Čutović	Citizens' Group	3,743	4.52
Miroslav Gazdić	Citizens' Group	2,860	3.45
Milan Miličević	Citizens' Group	1,944	2.35
Radovan Cvetić	Social-Democratic Party of Yugoslavia–Coal. JDL	1,852	2.24
Milojko Lukić	New Communist Party of Yugoslavia	1,682	2.03
Total valid votes		82,781	100
