= Judita Alargić =

Yugoslavian partisan

- Јудита Аларгић
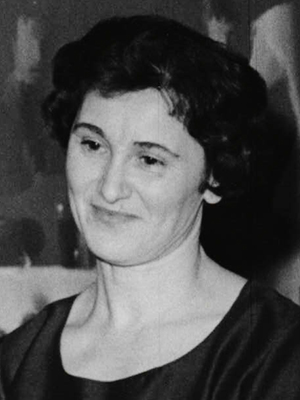

First Lady of Yugoslavia
- In role 15 May 1982 – 15 May 1983
- President: Petar Stambolic
- Preceded by: Mira Stupica
- Succeeded by: Štefa Špiljak

Personal details
- Born: 1 August 1917 Novi Sad, Austria-Hungary
- Died: 12 June 2011 (aged 93) Belgrade, Serbia
- Spouse: Petar Stambolic
- Awards: Order of Bravery; Order of the Partisan Star; Commemorative Medal of the Partisans of 1941

Military service
- Branch/service: Yugoslav Partisans
- Years of service: 1941-1945
- Rank: Major (reserve)

Judita Alargić-Stambolić (1 August 1917 – 12 June 2011) was a participant in the National Liberation Struggle and a socio-political worker of the Socialist Republic of Serbia. She was a board member of the Anti-Fascist Women's Front (AFŽ) and continued her political career after the Second World War in the Union of Communists of Serbia.

== Biography ==
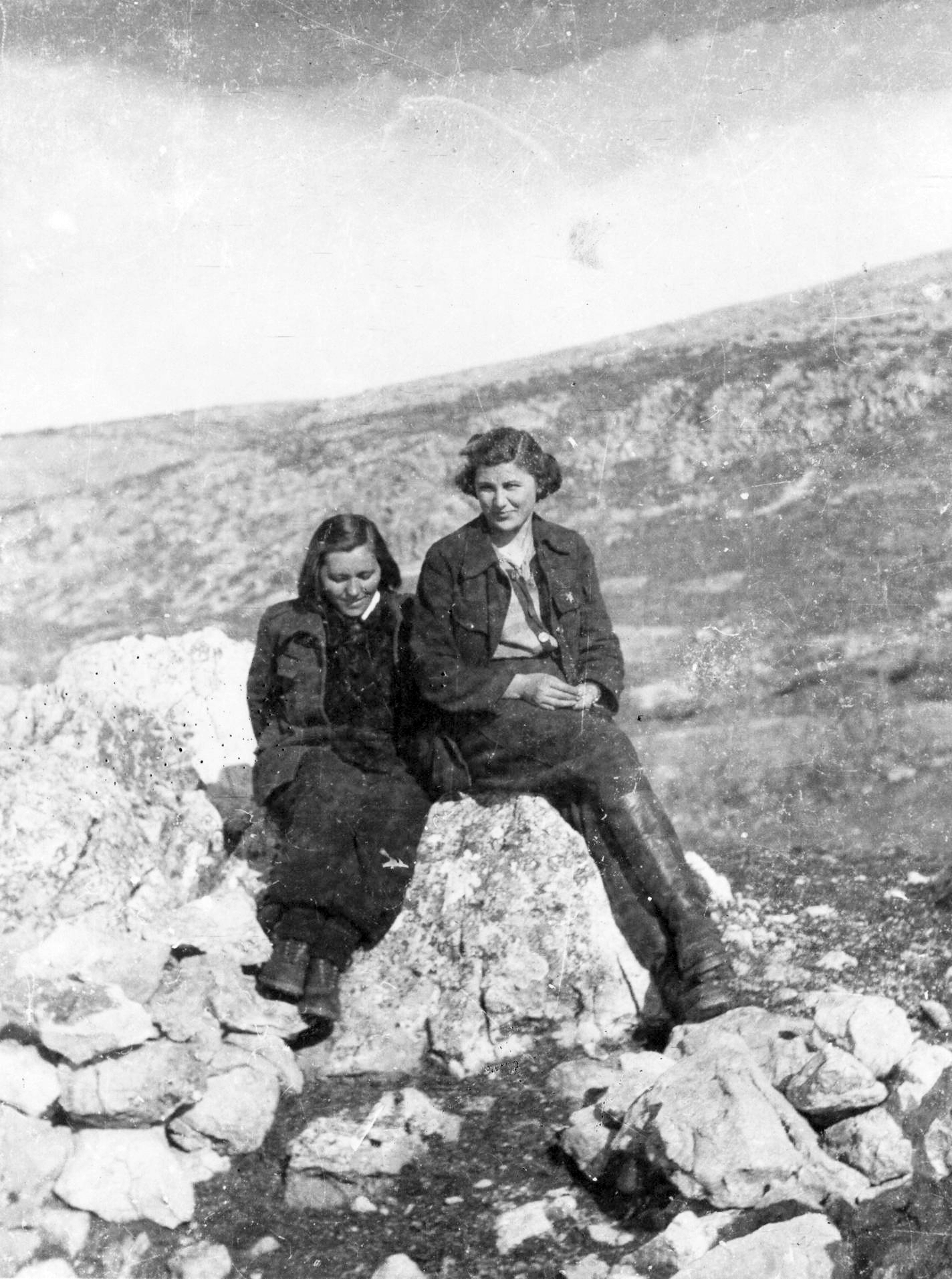
Ljubinka Milosavljević and Alargić

Alargić was born on 1 August 1917 in Novi Sad (then a part of Austria-Hungary). Before the Second World War she was a member of the revolutionary labor movement, whilst working in the textile industry in Belgrade, where she was shocked by the conditions workers were subjected to. In 1939 became a member of the then illegal Communist Party of Yugoslavia (KPJ).

From 1941, during the occupation of Yugoslavia, Alargić was based in Obrenovac, Belgrade. She joined the Central Committee of the KPJ for Obrenovac and was active in the party during the preparations for the armed uprising. She served as a courier between the Posavina Partisan Detachment (sh) and the Provincial Committee of the KPJ for Serbia. After the first Nazi offensive and the withdrawal of partisan forces (sr) to Sandžak, she helped to organise the partisan hospital in Radoinja, near Nova Varoš.

From 1942 she worked as commissar at the partisan hospitals at Nova Varoš and at the Central Hospital (sr) in liberated Foča. She was a member of the Political Department (Politodela) of the Second Proletarian Strike Brigade (sr). On 6 December 1942 she attended the First Conference of the Anti-Fascist Women's Front (AFŽ) in Bosanski Petrovac, where she was elected to its board. She was a key figure in the first generation of AFŽ organisers.

From 1943 she served near to Bihać as an instructor of the Central Committee of the Communist Party of Yugoslavia. By the end of the year she was appointed as a member of the Politodela of the Thirteenth Proletarian Strike Brigade (sr). In September 1944, she was assigned to party work in Vojvodina, where she remained until the end of the war. She came out of the war with the rank of reserve major of the Yugoslav People's Army.

=== Post-war period ===
After the liberation of Yugoslavia, Alargić belonged to a group of female revolutionaries who achieved a longer political career. She held the positions of a member of the City Committee of the Alliance of Communists of Belgrade (sr), was President of the Alliance of Women's Societies of Belgrade and a member of the Main Board of the Anti-Fascist Front of Women of Serbia. At the Fourth Congress of the Communist Party of Serbia, held in June 1959, she was elected as a member of the Central Committee of the Union of Communists of Serbia. She died in 2011.

== Recognition ==
Alargić received multiple honors for her service in the Yugoslav resistance, including the Commemorative Medal of the Partisans of 1941, the Order of Merit for the People with a Golden Star (sr), the Order of Bravery and the Order of the Partisan Star with Rifles.

== Personal life ==
Alargić was married to the revolutionary Petar Stambolić (1912-2007).
