= Oldest Member (European Parliament) =

Eldest sitting member of European Parliament

Oldest members
Name	Party	State	Date	Age
Louise Weiss (1893-1983)	EPP	France	1979	86
Louise Weiss (1893-1983)	EPP	France	1982	89
Jacqueline Thome-Patenôtre (1906-1995)	EDA	France	1984	78
Nikolaos Gazis (1903-1996)	SOC	Greece	1987	83
Claude Autant-Lara (1901-2000)	DR	France	1989	88
Bruno Visentini (1914-1995)	LDR	Italy	1992	77
Vasilis Efraimidis (1915-2000)	GUE/NGL	Greece	1994	79
Otto von Habsburg (1912-2011)	EPP	Germany	1997	85
Giorgio Napolitano (1925-2023)	PES	Italy	1999	74
Giorgio Napolitano (1925-2023)	PES	Italy	2002	77
Giovanni Berlinguer (1924-2015)	PES	Italy	2004	80
Giovanni Berlinguer (1924-2015)	PES	Italy	2007	83
Ciriaco De Mita (1928-2022)	EPP	Italy	2009	81
Ciriaco De Mita (1928-2022)	EPP	Italy	2012	83
Manolis Glezos (1922-2020)	GUE/NGL	Greece	2014	91
Jean-Marie Le Pen (1928-2025)	NI	France	2015	87
Silvio Berlusconi (1936-2023)	EPP	Italy	2019	83
Mercedes Bresso (born 1944)	PES	Italy	2024	79

The Oldest Member is the eldest Member of European Parliament at the beginning of a new legislature and at the mid-term election of a new President of the European Parliament. Until 2009 the Oldest Member presided over the chamber during the election of the President, similar to the Father of the House. This privilege was abolished in 2009.

== 1979–1987 ==
From the European Parliament's first session on, the parliament's Rules of Procedure gave the oldest member the privilege to chair proceedings until a new President was elected. In the meantime, however, no other business was to be transacted unless concerned with the election.

This provision gave room for an opening speech from the oldest member, before the chair was taken by the newly elected president. In 1979, the first oldest member of the European Parliament, Louise Weiss, gave a one-hour-speech and received both standing ovations and a warm public reception. The same held true for her immediate successors Jacqueline Thome-Patenôtre and Nikolaos Gazis.

== 1989 controversy ==
After the 1989 European Parliament election, it turned out that the 87-year-old far-right politician Claude Autant-Lara of the French National Front would be the oldest member and therefore entitled to give the opening speech.

In front of a nearly empty house, Autant-Lara gave the longest opening speech ever, spreading fear of American "cultural invaders" he said would colonise and endanger European culture more than the Soviet Union. In a final appeal, he asked the youth to turn down a Coke for a glass of Alsacian wine only once. The speech was widely criticised as meandering and mostly absurd, but also nationalist, anti-American and even antisemitic.

During the speech, the Socialists placed 180 red roses in front of their seats while staying outside of the plenary room. Some leftists stayed inside holding up "Never again fascism!" placards. Other legislators listened to the first few minutes of the opening speech but then left the room.

== 1992–2007 ==
Apart from being criticised in content, Autant-Lara's opening speech largely overstretched the already wide tolerance of deviation from the intent of the institution of the Oldest Member. In 1992, Italian MEP Bruno Visentini refrained from giving a speech, while in 1994 Greek MEP Vassilis Ephremidis spoke some reconciliatory words.

== 2009 controversy and abolition of privilege ==
It was feared that, after the 2009 elections, Jean-Marie Le Pen, a far-right MEP from France who had been convicted for Holocaust denial in his home country, might be the oldest member, aged 81. In response to this concern, the Parliament's rules were changed (Corbett report) so that the outgoing President (if re-elected as an MEP) or one of the outgoing Vice-Presidents would chair the first session of Parliament until a new President was elected. Green co-head Daniel Cohn-Bendit wanted to change the rules so that the youngest member would chair the session, to reflect the future. In the event, after the election, former Italian Prime Minister Ciriaco de Mita was in fact the oldest member, rather than Le Pen.
