= Kustaa Tiitu =

Finnish politician

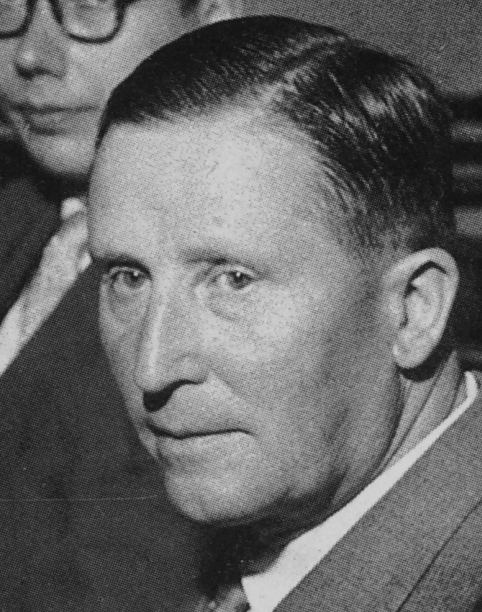
Kustaa Tiitu (1957)

Kustaa Emil Tiitu (10 June 1896, Lapua – 7 July 1990) was a Finnish farmer and politician. He served as Minister of Defence from 17 March 1950 to 17 January 1951 and as Deputy Minister of Transport and Public Works from 2 July to 2 September 1957. Tiitu was a Member of the Parliament of Finland from 1945 to 1958 and again from 1965 to 1970, representing the Agrarian League, which renamed itself the Centre Party in 1965.
