= Slobodan Penezić =

Yugoslav communist politician

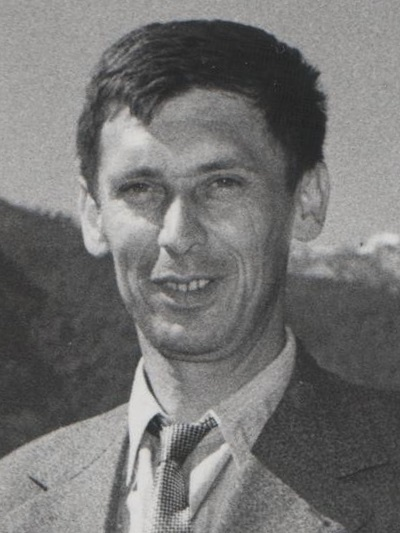
- Penezić in 1958

Minister of Internal Affairs
- In office 22 November 1946 – 16 December 1953
- Preceded by: Marko Trifković; Kingdom of Serbia
- Succeeded by: Vojin Lukić

Prime Minister of Serbia As President of the Executive Council of SR Serbia
- In office 9 June 1962 – 6 November 1964
- Preceded by: Miloš Minić
- Succeeded by: Stevan Doronjski

Personal details
- Born: 2 July 1918 Užice, Kingdom of Serbia
- Died: 6 November 1964 (aged 46) Šopić, SR Serbia, SFR Yugoslavia
- Party: Communist Party of Yugoslavia
- Spouse: Grozdana Belić-Penezić
- Children: Sons Srđan and Relja, daughter Vida
- Nickname: Krcun

Slobodan Penezić "Krcun" (Serbian Cyrillic: Слободан Пенезић "Крцун"; 2 July 1918 – 6 November 1964) was a Yugoslav communist politician who served as Prime Minister and Minister of Internal Affairs of the Socialist Republic of Serbia. In his heyday, he was the Secret Police chief in Serbia.

He was also notable for leading the arrest of Draža Mihailović and for being awarded the Order of the People's Hero (on 5 July 1952).

== Career ==
Penezić was a member of the Central Committee of the League of Communists of Yugoslavia, a member of the League of Communists of Serbia Executive Committee and was also chairman of the Executive Council of the Serbian parliament.

== Death ==
On 6 November 1964, Penezić and Svetolik Lazarević were killed in a car accident when the state car they were riding in, a 1964 Oldsmobile F85 Deluxe Sedan, skidded off a wet and muddy road and into a tree. Penezić's death cleared the way for plans by Edvard Kardelj to limit the power of secret police chief Aleksandar Ranković at a crucial party congress.

His wife was among those who doubted the circumstances of his death, but his son considered finding out hard facts nearly impossible.
