= Zdeněk Jičínský =

Czech lawyer and politician (1929–2020)

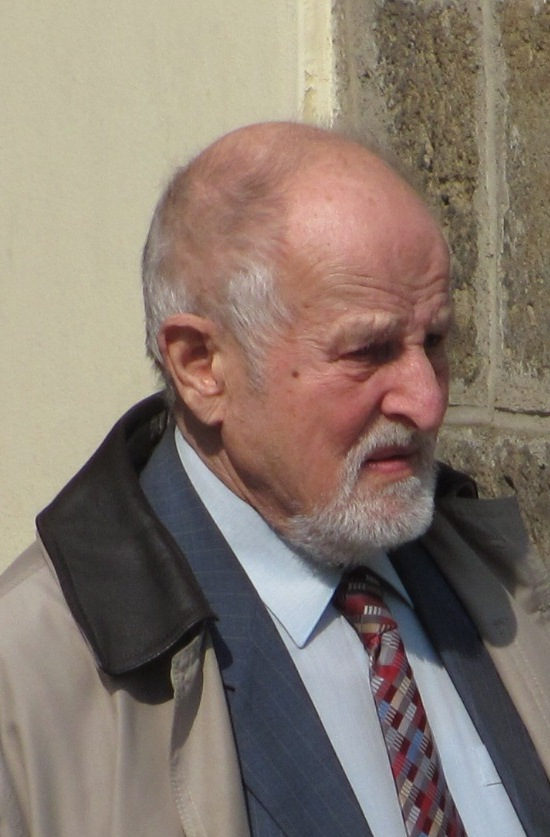
- Jičínský in 2010

Member of the Chamber of Deputies of the Czech Republic
- In office 26 July 2003 – 3 June 2010

Member of the Chamber of Deputies of the Czech Republic
- In office 1 June 1996 – 20 June 2002

Member of the Federal Assembly of Czechoslovakia
- In office 30 January 1990 – 31 December 1992

Member of the Federal Assembly of Czechoslovakia
- In office 1969–1969

Member of the Czech National Council
- In office 1969–1969

Personal details
- Born: 26 February 1929 Ostřešany, Czechoslovakia
- Died: 9 April 2020 (aged 91) Czech Republic
- Party: Czech Social Democratic Party (1992–2020)
- Other political affiliations: Civic Forum; Communist Party of Czechoslovakia
- Education: Charles University
- Occupation: Lawyer; Politician

Zdeněk Jičínský (26 February 1929 – 9 April 2020) was a Czech lawyer, politician, co-architect of the Constitution of the Czech Republic, and Charter 77 signatory. He served as a Deputy from 1996 to 2002 and from 2003 until 2010.
