= Juho Torppa =

Finnish politician (1859–1941)

Juho Torppa (6 October 1859, Veteli - 15 March 1941) was a Finnish farmer and politician. He was a member of the Diet of Finland from 1894 to 1906 and of the Parliament of Finland from 1907 to 1913, from 1919 to 1922 and from 1927 to 1929. He represented the Finnish Party until 1913, the National Progressive Party from 1919 to 1922 and the Agrarian League from 1927 to 1929.
