= Zaharije Trnavčević =

Serbian journalist and politician

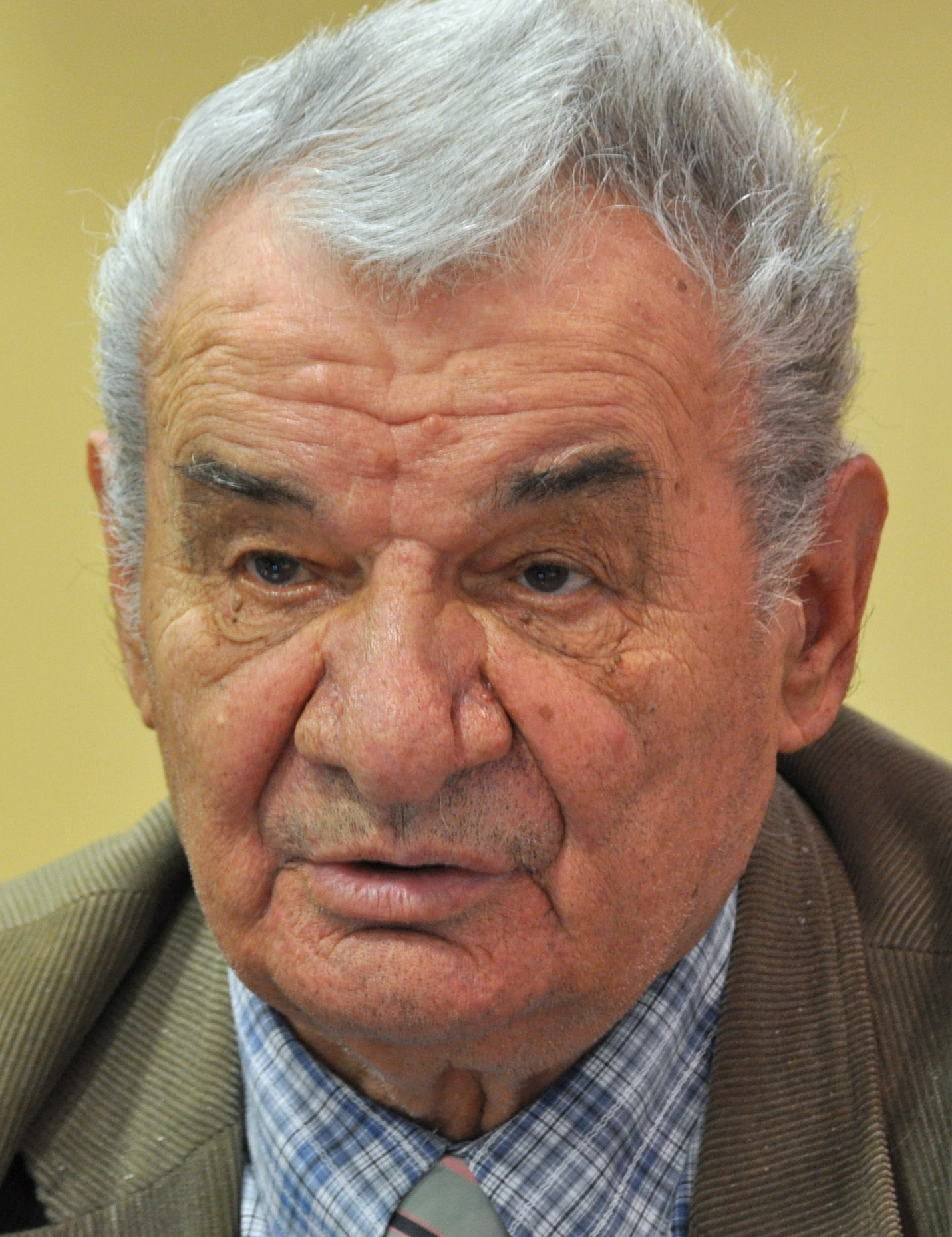

President of the National Assembly Acting
- In office 31 May 2012 – 23 July 2012
- Preceded by: Slavica Đukić Dejanović
- Succeeded by: Nebojša Stefanović

Personal details
- Born: 2 January 1926 Šabac, Kingdom of Serbs, Croats and Slovenes
- Died: 13 January 2016 (aged 90) Belgrade, Serbia
- Party: Rich Serbia (2011—2015)

Zaharije Trnavčević (Serbian Cyrillic: Захарије Трнавчевић; 2 January 1926 – 13 January 2016) was a Serbian journalist and politician. He was the president of the political party Rich Serbia. In the 2012 Serbian parliamentary election he was elected as a member of parliament, and as the oldest member became acting President of the National Assembly of Serbia.

Trnavčević died on 13 January 2016 in Belgrade, aged 90.
