= Milan Korać =

Milan Korać (Serbian Cyrillic: Милан Кораћ; 7 May 1929 – 24 December 2015) was a Serbian administrator and politician. He was a member of the Serbian parliament from 2014 to 2015, serving with the Party of United Pensioners of Serbia (PUPS).

== Administrator ==
Korać held a Bachelor of Laws degree and lived in Novi Sad. He was for many years a prominent figure at Naftna Industrija Srbije (NIS), which was known until 1991 as Naftagas.

In 1969, he was president of the Conference of the League of Communists of Yugoslavia (SKJ) for Naftagas and deputy secretary of assets of the League of Communists (SK) for the Oil Branch of Yugoslavia. In an interview from this period, he reviewed the recent establishment of a united SK branch representing four thousand oil sector workers, the development of a work program then under consideration by the relevant SK organizations, and the work of a Coordination Committee in developing cooperation between companies in the sector. He supported greater integration of the oil industry, against opposition from some circles.

Korać had become Naftagas's director of works abroad by 1976. He gave an extended interview to Borba in December of that year, in which he spoke of the company's increased investment in countries of the Non-Aligned Movement, giving particular attention to countries in northern and western Africa such as Tunisia, Guinea, and Gabon. In a 1981 interview, he discussed Naftagas's oil exploration contracts with the aforementioned countries, as well as its expanding work in Angola and Algeria, and its involvement with geographical surveying in the Yellow Sea of the People's Republic of China. He described limited access to foreign currency as one of the company's leading challenges.

In 1983, Korać said that the company's investments in Angola would soon produce as much oil as its domestic operations in Vojvodina.

Korać was named as interim director of NIS in December 1991, following the resignation of Stanko Radmilović. By 2005, Korać was a representative of Naftagas pensioners.

== Politician ==
Korać appeared in the 101st position on a combined electoral list of the PUPS and the Social Democratic Party (SDP) in the 2007 Serbian parliamentary election. The list did not cross the electoral threshold for assembly representation.

The PUPS later formed an alliance with the Socialist Party of Serbia (SPS), and Korać appeared in the 121st position on the SPS-led list in the 2008 Serbian parliamentary election. The list won twenty seats, and he did not receive a mandate. (From 2000 to 2011, all mandates in Serbian parliamentary elections were assigned to candidates on successful lists at the discretion of the sponsoring parties or coalitions, irrespective of numerical order. Korać could have received a mandate despite his list position, but in the event he did not.)

Korać was chosen as one of the PUPS's twelve vice-presidents in 2011.

Serbia's electoral system was reformed in 2011, such that all parliamentary mandates were awarded to candidates on successful lists in numerical order. Korać appeared in the thirty-second position on the SPS's list in the 2014 Serbian parliamentary election and was elected when the list won forty-four seats. As the oldest member of the new assembly, he oversaw the first sitting of parliament on an interim basis as it elected a new president. Subsequently, he was a member of the agriculture committee, (Note: Formally known as the Committee on Agriculture, Forestry, and Water Management.) a deputy member of the education committee (Note: Formally known as the Committee on Education, Science, Technological Development, and the Information Society.) and the environmental protection committee, and a member of the parliamentary friendship groups with Brazil, Russia, Slovenia, and Sweden. The PUPS was not part of Serbia's government in the 2014–16 parliament, but it provided outside support to the administration.

In a parliamentary speech in July 2014, Korać criticized former Serbian finance minister Mlađan Dinkić for providing NIS workers and pensioners with significantly undervalued shares in the company.

On 16 October 2014, Korać appeared as a PUPS representative at a parade commemorating the liberation of Belgrade in World War II; the parade was notable for the appearance of Russian president Vladimir Putin. He later said, "[Putin] left an impression on me of a simple man, which is a characteristic of the world's greatest statesmen. The parade was phenomenal, and the ties between Serbia and Russia were further strengthened."

== Death ==
Korać died on 24 December 2015.
