= Géza Malasits =

Hungarian politician

Géza Malasits (1874–1948) was a Hungarian politician.

Member of the Hungarian Social-Democratic Party, Malasits was a deputy of the Hungarian parliament after 1924. As a self-educated worker, he learned several languages beyond Hungarian and Croatian and broadened his outlook in England. He was arrested in 1944 by the Gestapo and deported to a concentration camp, but survived the afflictions.

Following his conviction, Malasits converted to Unitarianism and later became a member of the Church Council of the Unitarian Church in Hungary.
