= Velimir Simonović =

Serbian politician

Velimir Simonović (Serbian Cyrillic: Велимир Симоновић; 7 September 1928 – 12 December 2016) was a Serbian academic and politician. He served five terms in the Serbian parliament between 1991 and 2007. Simonović was at different times a member of the Democratic Party (DS), the Democratic Centre (DC), and the Democratic Party of Serbia (DSS).

== Early life and career ==
Simonović was born at Stara Planina in Staro Bučje, Zaječar municipality, in what was then the Timok Oblast of the Kingdom of Serbs, Croats, and Slovenes. He later rose to the position of full professor at the University of Belgrade's Faculty of Mechanical Engineering in the time of the Socialist Federal Republic of Yugoslavia. Simonović specialized in computer science prior to the start of his political career.

== Politician ==
=== Democratic Party (1990–95) ===
In 1990, Serbia transitioned from a one-party socialist state to a (nominal) multi-party democracy. For the next decade, the country's political culture was dominated by the authoritarian rule of Slobodan Milošević, leader of the Socialist Party of Serbia (SPS). Simonović joined the country's emerging democratic opposition in 1989, and in 1990 he became a founding member of the Democratic Party.

==== First parliamentary term ====
Simonović was first elected to the Serbian parliament in the 1990 Serbian parliamentary election, defeating SPS candidate and noted actor Mihailo Janketić in Palilula's first division in Belgrade. Janketić finished well ahead of all other candidates in the first round of voting, but Simonović managed to consolidate the opposition vote for a second-round victory. The Socialists won a landslide majority victory overall and the DS, with seven seats, served in opposition. Over the next two years, the Socialist Federal Republic of Yugoslavia dissolved and the Yugoslav Wars of the 1990s began.

Simonović criticized the Serbian government's draft legislation for the University of Belgrade in September 1991, saying that it amounted to a plan to nationalize the university. He was particularly critical of a proposal for the rector to appoint all faculty deans and vice-rectors, rather than having them elected by academic councils.

In March 1992, Simonović was one of twenty-two opposition parliamentarians who called for the dismissal of Serbian minister of culture Miodrag Đukić, after Đukić described the opposition as "Serbia's greatest enemy." Simonović remarked that government officials often described the opposition as "traitors" and that the opposition was not prepared to accept this any longer.

Simonović later criticized the government's efforts to turn the newspaper Politika into a state-owned enterprise. He suggested that the government could simply establish its own newspaper, if it so chose, and leave Politika to be independent and democratic.

==== Second parliamentary term ====
Serbia adopted a system of proportional representation prior to the 1992 Serbian parliamentary election. (Simonović and other opposition parliamentarians had proposed a compromise system of mixed proportional representation, but their idea was not accepted.) Under the new system, Serbia was divided into nine electoral units, each of which elected multiple members; the first one-third of assembly mandates were assigned to candidates from successful electoral lists in numerical order, with the remaining two-thirds assigned to other candidates on the lists at the discretion of the sponsoring parties or coalitions.

Simonović led the Democratic Party's list in the Niš constituency and was automatically re-elected to the assembly (due to rounding) when the list won a single mandate in the division. The Democratic Party won eight seats in total: six on its own, and two in an electoral alliance with the Reform Democratic Party of Vojvodina (RDSV). The Socialists won the election but fell below majority status with 101 seats out of 250. Following the vote, Simonović endorsed Federal Republic of Yugoslavia president Dobrica Ćosić's call for a unity "government of national salvation," but this did not take place. Instead, the Socialists continued in government with unofficial support from the far-right Serbian Radical Party (SRS), and the DS remained in opposition. Simonović served on the finance committee in his second term.

Simonović was also elected to the Belgrade city assembly in the December 1992 Serbian local elections, which took place concurrently with the parliamentary vote. Elections at the city level were still held in single-member constituency seats during this period, and Simonović was elected for the division of Palilula I. The Socialists won a majority victory in the city assembly, and the DS served in opposition at this level as well.

In September 1993, Simonović was elected to the political council of the Democratic Party.

==== Third parliamentary term ====
The Socialist–Radical alliance broke down in late 1993, and a new Serbian parliamentary election was called for December of that year. Simonović did not seek re-election in Niš but instead appeared in the third position on the DS's list in Belgrade. He was again automatically re-elected (due to rounding) when the list won eight seats in the division. The Socialists won an increased plurality victory with 123 seats and afterward formed a coalition government with the small New Democracy (ND) party; the DS improved its standing to twenty-nine seats but continued to serve in opposition. When the assembly convened in early 1994, Simonović became a member of the education committee and the committee on petitions and proposals.

Zoran Đinđić replaced Dragoljub Mićunović as DS leader in January 1994. In the early years of Đinđić's leadership, the party shifted away from its traditional place within the "civic" pole of Serbian politics and moved toward a position of Serbian nationalism. In October 1994, Mićunović founded the Democratic Centre, which was not initially a political party but a cultural-democratic resource base. Simonović, an ally of Mićunović, was a founding member of the new organization.

Simonović proposed an amendment to Serbia's law on expropriation in May 1994 to better protect the rights of landowners. The following year, he spoke against the prospect of Serbia's socially owned land becoming state-owned.

Simonović was one of twenty-seven academics appointed by the Serbian government to an educational council in September 1994. The council's function was to provide advice to the education ministry.

On 2 December 1995, the DS expelled Dragoljub Mićunović and Simonović on the grounds of their being "undisciplined" and having "harmed the party's reputation." Simonović was specifically accused of refusing to leave the autumn 1995 parliamentary session with other opposition members; he said that he was following an earlier party decision not to leave parliament unless it was absolutely necessary. An article in the journal Vreme from this period described him as "a university professor, an elderly gentleman, decent, tactful and moderate, one of the few of that kind in the Serbian parliament."

=== Democratic Centre (1996–2003) ===
Mićunović established the Democratic Centre as a political party in early 1996. Simonović joined the new party and was chosen as a member of its inaugural presidency on 2 April of that year. In late 1996, he formed a new parliamentary group called "December 1" with former members of the Radical Party. He was not re-elected to the Belgrade assembly in the 1996 Serbian local elections and the Democratic Centre later boycotted the 1997 Serbian parliamentary election, ending for a time his tenure in the national assembly.

Simonović was a vice-president of the Democratic Centre by 1998. In July of that year, he urged the international community to compel Kosovo Albanian political leaders to take part in negotiations with Serbian and Yugoslavian authorities over the future of the province; he also described the ongoing insurgency in Kosovo as "pure terrorism, which we must fight fiercely against." In November 1998, he said that the international community was placing undue restrictions on Serbia in containing the insurgency and expressed concern that the insurgents were creating incidents to give North Atlantic Treaty Organization (NATO) forces an excuse to enter the province. Serbia lost control over most of Kosovo following the NATO bombing of Yugoslavia in 1999.

In early 2000, the DC joined the Democratic Opposition of Serbia (DOS), a broad and ideologically diverse coalition of parties opposed to Slobodan Milošević's continued rule. This decision brought the DC back into an alliance with the Democratic Party, which was one of the leading parties in the coalition. DOS candidate Vojislav Koštunica defeated Milošević in the 2000 Yugoslavian presidential election, and Milošević fell from power on 5 October 2000, a watershed moment in Serbian and Yugoslavian politics. Simonović was elected to the municipal assembly of Palilula in Belgrade in the 2000 Serbian local elections, which took place concurrently with the Yugoslavian vote; the DOS won a landslide majority in the municipality with fifty-one out of fifty-five seats, and he served afterward as a supporter of the local administration.

Serbia's government also fell after Milošević's defeat, and a new Serbian parliamentary election was called for December 2000. In advance of the vote, Serbia's electoral laws were changed such that the entire country became a single "at-large" electoral division and all mandates were assigned to candidates on successful lists at the discretion of the sponsoring parties or coalitions, irrespective of numerical order. Simonović appeared in the 172nd position on the DOS's electoral list and was assigned a mandate after the coalition won a majority victory with 176 out of 250 seats. In his fourth parliamentary term, he was a member of the committee for relations with Serbs outside Serbia, the committee for environmental protection, and the committee for science and technological development.

Simonović supported Vojislav Koštunica in the September–October 2002 Serbian presidential election. Although Koštunica won the vote, the election was invalidated due to low turnout.

In October 2003, Simonović broke with his party in supporting the removal of Nataša Mičić as president of the Serbian parliament. Not long after this, he left the DC and joined the Democratic Party of Serbia. Simonović later described the 2001–04 parliament as having been "very bad" and identified the DS as the main culprit for this state of affairs, blaming the party for allowing a breakdown of parliamentary procedure and squandering an opportunity to make real changes in the country.

=== Democratic Party of Serbia (2003–07) ===
Simonović appeared in the ninth position on the DSS's electoral list for the 2003 Serbian parliamentary election, which took place on 28 December of that year. The list won fifty-three seats, and he was included afterward in the party's assembly delegation.

As the oldest member of the new parliament, Simonović had the responsibility of presiding over the assembly before it elected a full-time president. While preparing for this responsibility, he called on parliament to immediately pass new rules of procedure that would stipulate the right of members to speak freely within the assembly. Due to delays in electing a full-time president, Simonović ultimately served in the role on an interim basis from 27 January to 4 February 2004. Subsequently, he was a member of the committee for science and technological development and the committee for transport and communications. The DSS emerged as the dominant party in Serbia's coalition government after the election, and Simonović again served as a government supporter. He supported the introduction of a dress code for the assembly later in 2004.

Simonović was elected as a member of the DSS's main board in November 2004.

The DSS contested the 2007 Serbian parliamentary election in an alliance with New Serbia (NS), and Simonović appeared in the ninety-fifth position on their combined list. The list won forty-seven seats, and he was not given a mandate for another term. He retired from political life at this time.

== Death ==
Simonović died on 12 December 2016, at age eighty-eight.

== Electoral record ==
=== National Assembly of Serbia ===
1990 Serbian parliamentary election: Palilula I
| Candidate | Party | First round | | Second round | |
| Candidate | Party | Votes | % | Votes | % |
|---|---|---|---|---|---|
| Velimir Simonović | Democratic Party | | 17.93 | | elected by c. 3000 votes |
| Mihailo Miša Janketić | Socialist Party of Serbia | | 42.41 | | defeated |
| Miroslav Dimitrijević | People's Radical Party | | defeated | | |
| Dobro Marić | Party of Yugoslavs | | defeated | | |
| Želimir Novković “Cile” | Green Party | | defeated | | |
| Mihailo Paunović | New Democracy – Movement for Serbia | | defeated | | |
| Dr. Vesna Pešić | Association for the Yugoslav Democratic Initiative– Union of Reform Forces of Yugoslavia in Serbia (Affiliation: Association for the Yugoslav Democratic Initiative) | | defeated | | |
| Dr. Jovan Radojević | Citizens' Group | | defeated | | |
| Vojin Rakić | Serbian Renewal Movement | | defeated | | |
| Petar Tomić | Citizens' Group | | defeated | | |
| Miodrag Vasić | Serbian National Renewal | | defeated | | |
| Total | | | | | |
Source: All candidates except Simonović and Janketić are listed alphabetically.

=== Local (City of Belgrade) ===
December 1992 Belgrade city election: Palilula Division 1
| Candidate | Party | Votes | % |
|---|---|---|---|
| Velimir Simonović | Democratic Party | | elected |
| other candidates | | | |
| Total | | | |

=== Local (Municipality of Palilula, Belgrade) ===
2000 Palilula municipal election: Division 1 (Tašmajdan I)
| Candidate | Party | Votes | % |
|---|---|---|---|
| Velimir Simonović | Democratic Opposition of Serbia (Affiliation: Democratic Centre) | | elected |
| Milena Popović | Serbian Renewal Movement | | defeated |
| Milan Resavac | Serbian Radical Party | | defeated |
| Daniela Vučić | Socialist Party of Serbia–Yugoslav Left | | defeated |
| Total | | | |
Source: All candidates except Simonović are listed alphabetically.
