= Mikko Kaarna =

Finnish farmer and politician (1911–2010)

Mikko Kaarna (1 October 1911 – 30 August 2010) was a Finnish farmer and politician, born in Lappee. He was a member of the Parliament of Finland from 1960 to 1962 and from 1966 to 1983, representing the Agrarian League, which changed its name to Centre Party in 1965. He was a presidential elector in the 1956, 1962, 1968 and 1978 presidential elections.
