= Iisakki Hoikka =

Finnish politician

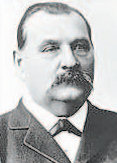
Iisakki Hoikka

Iisakki Hoikka (2 April 1840 - 6 December 1917) was a Finnish farmer and politician, born in Kemi. He was a member of the Diet of Finland from 1882 to 1899 and of the Parliament of Finland from 1907 to 1908 and again from 1909 to 1910, representing the Finnish Party.
