= Miloš Minić =

Yugoslav politician (1914–2003)

- Милош Минић
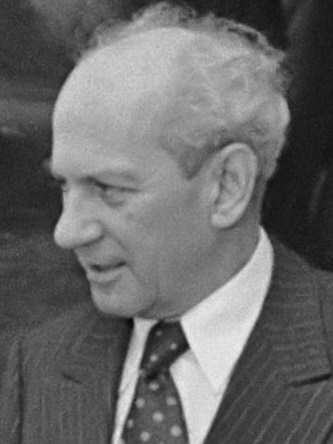
- Minić in 1975

President of the Assembly of SR Serbia
- In office 6 May 1967 – 6 May 1969
- Preceded by: Dušan Petrović
- Succeeded by: Dragoslav Marković

50th Prime Minister of Serbia As President of the Executive Council of PR Serbia
- In office 6 April 1957 – 9 June 1962
- Preceded by: Jovan Veselinov
- Succeeded by: Slobodan Penezić

Minister of Foreign Affairs of Yugoslavia
- In office 16 December 1972 – 17 May 1978
- President: Josip Broz Tito
- Preceded by: Jakša Petrić (acting)
- Succeeded by: Josip Vrhovec

57th Mayor of Belgrade
- In office 1955–1957
- Preceded by: Đurica Jojkić
- Succeeded by: Đurica Jojkić

Personal details
- Born: 28 August 1914 Čačak, Serbia
- Died: 5 September 2003 (aged 89) Belgrade, Serbia and Montenegro
- Party: KPJ
- Spouse: Milka Minić
- Education: University of Belgrade

Miloš Minić (Serbian Cyrillic: Милош Минић; 28 August 1914 – 5 September 2003) was a Yugoslav Serbian communist politician.

== Biography ==
Minić graduated from secondary school in Čačak, then from the University of Belgrade's Law School. From 1935 he was a member of the then-illegal Young Communist League of Yugoslavia (SKOJ), as well as the Communist Party of Yugoslavia (KPJ), holding senior positions in both organizations. During the Partisans' war against Germany and Italy, Minić held both party and military posts from 1941.

After the liberation of Serbia from Nazi occupation, he was the head of Department for the Protection of the People's Belgrade branch, then public prosecutor of Serbia and representative of the military prosecutor of the Yugoslav People's Army (JNA). He then held several posts in the Yugoslav and Serbian government. He was the Minister for Foreign Affairs of Yugoslavia from 16 December 1972 to 17 May 1978, and during this time signed the Treaty of Osimo, which resolved border disputes between Italy and Yugoslavia.

== Honours and awards ==
=== National honours ===
- Order of People's Liberation (6 July 1945)
- Order of the People's Hero (9 October 1953)
- Order of the Hero of Socialist Labour (4 June 1979)

=== Foreign honours ===
- (Poland) Commander's Cross with Star of the Order of Polonia Restituta (25 June 1964)
- Grand Cross of the Order of the Sun of Peru (7 January 1974)
- (Portugal) Grand Cross of the Order of Prince Henry (28 July 1976)
