= Borka Vučić =

Serbian politician

Borka Vučić (Serbian Cyrillic: Борка Вучић; 1 April 1926 – 1 August 2009) was a Serbian politician and banker.

She served as the acting President of the National Assembly of the Republic of Serbia, elected on the list of the Socialist Party of Serbia in the 21 January 2007 parliamentary election. She was head of state-owned Beogradska Banka under former Serbian president Slobodan Milosević and was considered important in the maintenance of that regime.

She died in a car accident on August 1, 2009, near Lapovo in Serbia.
