= Ratomir Dugonjić =

Yugoslav Partisan fighter and politician

Rato Dugonjić
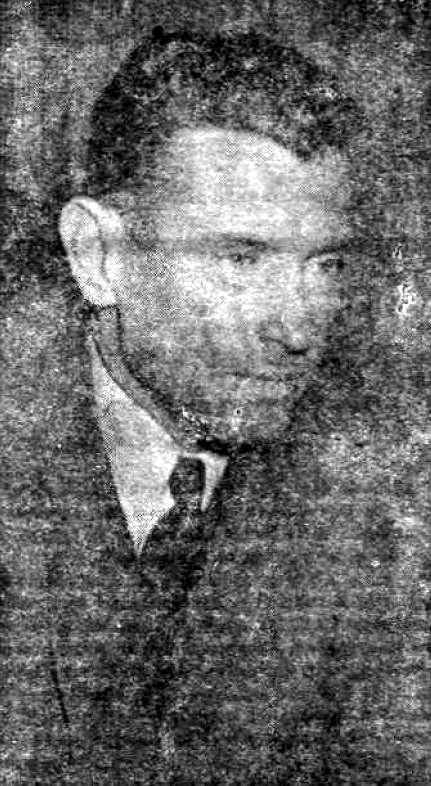
- Dugonjić in 1956

2nd Vice President of the Presidency of the Socialist Federal Republic of Yugoslavia
- In office 1 August 1972 – June 1973
- President: Josip Broz Tito
- Preceded by: Krste Crvenkovski
- Succeeded by: Mitja Ribičič

1st President of the Presidency of the Socialist Republic of Bosnia and Herzegovina
- In office May 1974 – August 1978
- Prime Minister: Milanko Renovica
- Preceded by: Hamdija Pozderac (as President of the People's Assembly of the Socialist Republic of Bosnia and Herzegovina)
- Succeeded by: Raif Dizdarević

2nd President of the People's Assembly of the Socialist Republic of Bosnia and Herzegovina
- In office June 1963 – 1967
- Prime Minister: Hasan Brkić; Rudi Kolak
- Preceded by: Đuro Pucar
- Succeeded by: Džemal Bijedić

Personal details
- Born: Ratomir Dugonjić; 10 January 1916 Trebinje, Condominium of Bosnia and Herzegovina, Austria-Hungary
- Died: 27 June 1987 (aged 71) Sarajevo, SR Bosnia and Herzegovina, SFR Yugoslavia
- Party: SKJ

Ratomir "Rato" Dugonjić (10 January 1916 – 27 June 1987) was a Bosnian and Yugoslav Partisan fighter in the antifascist liberation struggle of the people of Yugoslavia, Minister in the Communist Government, Ambassador with the Non-Aligned Movement, president of the Socialist Republic of Bosnia and Herzegovina and the Vice President of the Socialist Federal Republic of Yugoslavia. Dugonjić was a member of the Politburo Central Committee, League of Communists of Bosnia and Herzegovina and a member of the Central Committee of the League of Communists of Yugoslavia of the Fifth to Eighth Congress and member of the Presidency of the Central Committee. He was a member of the Presidency of Yugoslavia and Federal Council.

== Early life and education ==
Dugonjić was born on 10 January 1916 in Trebinje. He attended elementary school in his hometown, high school in Sarajevo and studied at the Faculty of Law in Belgrade. As a high school student in Sarajevo, he joined the revolutionary youth movement. During his studies in Belgrade, he was one of the most active members of the revolutionary student movement, which was then under the influence of illegal League of Communists of Yugoslavia. In 1937, he was admitted to the membership of the Communist Party of Yugoslavia.

== Political career ==
As a member of the Party, Dugonjić became more engaged in political work and in the reconstruction organization League of Communist Youth of Yugoslavia during the sixth janurske dictatorship. He collaborated with Ivo Lola Ribar and other members of the Central Communist Youth League. He moved from Belgrade to Sarajevo, because law students were required to attend lectures. Upon completion of the Faculty of Law, he entered the Faculty of Forestry in Sarajevo.

Dugonjić was actively engaged in soccer and played for the Sarajevo clubs "Slavija" and "SAŠK". As a player, he often traveled to larger cities including Belgrade, Split, Ljubljana, Zagreb, Osijek and Skopje. He used these trips to carry illegal party materials. His connections were Ivan Milutinović in Zagreb, and Svetozar Vukmanović in Belgrade. In 1939, when the Provincial Communist Party of Yugoslavia for Bosnia and Herzegovina formed a youth committee, Dugonjić became a member at the suggestion of Ivo Lola Ribar. His political work was noticed by the police, and before the war he was arrested, and for a time he was in detention in Sarajevo.

During the 1941 April War and occupation of the Kingdom of Yugoslavia, Dugonjić went to Sarajevo, where he stayed with his cousin Miljenko Cvitković, a Spanish fighter. Dugonjić worked actively to improve the situation of the Communist Youth in the conditions of occupation. In the period up to the beginning of the uprising, July 1941, he repeatedly traveled to Zagreb and Belgrade, meeting the Central Committee of Communist Youth League and with other members of the Central Communist Youth League including Jožo Vlahović, Jovan Stojsavljević and others. He was one of the organizers of the uprising in Sarajevo. He worked on the organization of shock and diverzantiskih group, who executed sabotage and diversion in the city.

When the Semizovac partisan unit was formed, Dugonjić became its Political Commissar. With the detachment, he took part in the first act of rebellion in the area occupied at Sarajevo in September 1941. He was in liberated Užice, which was then the seat of CPY, RC Youth League and the Supreme Headquarters of the National Liberation Movement detachment of Yugoslavia. Here Lola Ribar entrusted the duty of the Secretary of the Provincial Committee of the Communist Youth League of BiH and Vartio in Bosnia. First, by the beginning of 1942, he had spent time in eastern Bosnia, where he had a direct connection with the Kingdom, but since there was no connection with Bosnian Krajina, he went there. After a short stay in the Bosnian Krajina, he went to Herzegovina. On the way to Herzegovina, in Seonica he met with Supreme Headquarters and Josip Broz Tito. In Herzegovina he spent about a month, and then UPTU on Mlinište, where then, in September 1942, was the Supreme Headquarters. There he met with Lola Ribar and Mika Špiljak, then the only living members of the Central Committee of the Communist Youth League. The meeting decided to form a new core RC Communist Youth League, and he has become the organizational secretary of the Central Communist Youth League. After the death of Ivo Lola Ribar in November 1943, he assumed the position of political secretary of the Central Committee Communist Youth League and stayed at this position until 1948, when the Communist Youth united with National Youth of Yugoslavia.

As organizational secretary of PK SKOJ, Dugonjić had a significant part in the organization and activities of the United League of Antifascist Youth of Yugoslavia (USAOJ). He participated in both war congresses of this organization: in Bihać in December 1942, and Drvar in May 1944. He exercised important functions in the organization of national authorities in the liberated territory. He was a councillor of the Anti-Fascist Council for the National Liberation of Yugoslavia and ZAVNO Bosnia and Herzegovina. In addition to the political work he participated in the fighting. One of the most significant battles in which he participated was the landing on Drvar, when the members of the Communist Youth League and USAOJ returned to the besieged city and took part in the protection of the approach at Tito's cave in Drvar, location of the Supreme headquarters of the Partisans.

After the liberation of Yugoslavia, as secretary of the Central Communist Youth League and President USAOJ, Dugonjić actively participated in organizing the first youth work actions (Brčko-Banovići railway and railway Samac-Sarajevo). He was secretary of the City Committee of the Communist Party of Yugoslavia in Belgrade, minister of light industry in the Yugoslav Government, the Secretary of the City Committee of the Communist Party of Yugoslavia in Sarajevo, and President of the People's Front of Bosnia and Herzegovina.

Dugonjić was ambassador of Yugoslavia to Poland and the United Arab Republic. After returning to the country he served as President of the National Assembly of the Socialist Republic of Bosnia and Herzegovina, from 1963. In 1967, he was President of the Federal Conference in the Socialist Alliance of Working People of Yugoslavia. From May 1974 he became the President of the Presidency of the Socialist Republic of Bosnia and Herzegovina, serving 4 years, until April 1978.

Dugonjić was a member of the Politburo Central Committee, League of Communists of Bosnia and Herzegovina and a member of the Central Committee of the League of Communists of Yugoslavia of the Fifth to Eighth Congress and of 1966 and member of its Presidency. He was elected as a deputy of the Federal Assembly and the Assembly of Bosnia and Herzegovina in the longer term. He was a member of the Presidency of Yugoslavia and Federal Council. He died 27 June 1987 in Sarajevo.

== Awards and honors ==
He was holder of the Partisan memorial 1941 and other Yugoslav medals, including Order of the Hero of Socialist Labour, Order of National Liberation, Order of brotherhood and unity and others. Order of National Hero was awarded on 27 November 1953.

== Sources ==
- Military Encyclopaedia (another book), Belgrade 1971
- National heroes of Yugoslavia, Mladost, Belgrade 1975
- Milomir Maric, The children of communism, Mladost", Belgrade 1987
