= Humo =

Humo may refer to:

== People ==
- Avdo Humo (1914–1983), Bosnian politician
- Hamza Humo (1895–1970), Bosnian author
- Olga Humo (1919–2013), Yugoslav partisan, writer and university professor
- Yuan Humo, Chinese empress

== Places ==
- Humo Ice Dome, Uzbekistan
- Humo (restaurant), in London

== Other ==
- Humo (magazine), a Dutch-language Belgian satirical magazine
- Humo Tashkent
- Humorology, a nonprofit organization that holds an annual student fundraiser
- humo, the Spanish word for "smoke".
