= Socialist Republic of Bosnia and Herzegovina =

Federated state of Yugoslavia (1943–1992)

Coordinates: 43°52′N 18°25′E

Socialist Republic of Bosnia and Herzegovina (Note: Former names: 1945–1946 Federated State of Bosnia and Herzegovina; Serbo-Croatian: Федерална Држава Босна и Херцеговина, romanized: Federalna Država Bosna i Hercegovina: 1946–1963 People's Republic of Bosnia and Herzegovina; Serbo-Croatian: Народна Република Босна и Херцеговина, romanized: Narodna Republika Bosna i Hercegovina) Социјалистичка Pепублика Босна и Херцеговина Socijalistička Republika Bosna i Hercegovina
- 1943–1992
- Flag Coat of arms

- Location of Bosnia and Herzegovina in Yugoslavia.
- Status: Constituent republic of Yugoslavia
- Capital: Sarajevo
- Common languages: Serbo-Croatian (Bosnian)
- Ethnic groups (1991): 43.5% Bosniaks (ethnic Muslims); 31.2% Serbs; 17.4% Croats; 5.5% Yugoslavs; 2.4% Others
- Government: 1945–1990: Unitary communist state 1990–1992: Unitary parliamentary republic
- Leader of the LCBiH
  - 1943–1965: Đuro Pucar (first)
  - 1989–1991: Nijaz Duraković (last)
- Head of state
  - 1945–1946: Vojislav Kecmanović (first)
  - 1990–1992: Alija Izetbegović (last)
- Head of government
  - 1945–1948: Rodoljub Čolaković (first)
  - 1990–1992: Jure Pelivan (last)
- Legislature: People's Assembly
- Historical era: Cold War
  - First session of ZAVNOBiH: 25 November 1943
  - Croatian Republic of Herzeg-Bosnia: 18 November 1991
  - Republika Srpska formed: 9 January 1992
  - 1992 Bosnian independence referendum: 1 March 1992
  - Outbreak of Bosnian War: 5 April 1992
  - Independence: 6 April 1992

Area
  - Total: 51,129 km^{2} (19,741 sq mi)
- ISO 3166 code: BA
Preceded by
Kingdom of Yugoslavia
Independent State of Croatia
Succeeded by
Republic of Bosnia and Herzegovina
Republika Srpska
Republic of Herzeg-Bosnia
Autonomous Province of Western-Bosnia

The Socialist Republic of Bosnia and Herzegovina (SR Bosnia and Herzegovina; SR BiH), commonly referred to as Socialist Bosnia or simply Bosnia, was one of the six constituent republics forming the Socialist Federal Republic of Yugoslavia. It was a predecessor of the modern-day Bosnia and Herzegovina, existing between 1945 and 1992, under a number of different formal names, including Democratic Bosnia and Herzegovina (1943–1945), Federal State of Bosnia and Herzegovina (1945–1946), and People's Republic of Bosnia and Herzegovina (1946–1963).

Within Yugoslavia, Bosnia and Herzegovina was a unique federal unit with no dominant ethnic group, as was the case in other constituent states, all of which were also nation states of Yugoslavia's South Slavic ethnic groups. It was administered under strict terms of sanctioned consociationalism, known locally as "ethnic key" or "national key" (Serbo-Croatian: etnički/nacionalni ključ), based on the balance of political representation of 3 largest ethnic groups (Bosnian Muslims, (Note: Now known as Bosniaks. Bosnian Muslim was the official label for the group at the time.) Croats and Serbs).

Sarajevo served as the capital city throughout its existence and remained the capital following independence. The Socialist Republic was dissolved in 1990 when it abandoned its socialist institutions and adopted liberal ones, as the Republic of Bosnia and Herzegovina which declared independence from Yugoslavia in 1992. The Government of Bosnia and Herzegovina was, up to 20 December 1990, in sole control of the League of Communists of Bosnia and Herzegovina, the Bosnian branch of League of Communists of Yugoslavia.

The borders of SR Bosnia and Herzegovina were almost identical to those that the Condominium of Bosnia and Herzegovina had during the period of Austro-Hungarian rule that lasted until 1918. That year Bosnia became part of the Kingdom of Serbs, Croats, and Slovenes and divided into several banovinas (regional administrative units), namely parts of Vrbas, Drina, Zeta and Croatia banovinas. With the establishment of a People's Republic, its modern borders were delineated.

== Name ==
The Socialist Republic of Bosnia and Herzegovina was formed during a meeting of the State Anti-fascist Council for the National Liberation of Bosnia and Herzegovina (ZAVNOBiH) in Mrkonjić Grad on 25 November 1943. In April 1945, its name was formalized as the Federated State of Bosnia and Herzegovina (Serbo-Croatian: Federalna Država Bosna i Hercegovina / Федерална Држава Босна и Херцеговина), a constituent unit of the Democratic Federal Yugoslavia.

With DF Yugoslavia changing its name to the Federal People's Republic of Yugoslavia on 29 November 1945 as well as the promulgation of the 1946 Yugoslav Constitution two months later in January, its constituent units also changed their respective names. FS Bosnia and Herzegovina thus became known as the People's Republic of Bosnia and Herzegovina (Narodna Republika Bosna i Hercegovina / Народна Република Босна и Херцеговина).

This constitutional system lasted until the 1963 Yugoslav Constitution. On 7 April 1963, Yugoslavia was reconstituted as the Socialist Federal Republic of Yugoslavia, and PR Bosnia and Herzegovina changed its name to the Socialist Republic of Bosnia and Herzegovina (Socijalistička Republika Bosna i Hercegovina / Социјалистичка Република Босна и Херцеговина).

After independence on 1 March 1992, the country was renamed to the Republic of Bosnia and Herzegovina. Following the Dayton Agreement that was in force, it became simply a federated state known as Bosnia and Herzegovina in 1997.

== History ==
Because of its central geographic position within the Yugoslav federation, post-war Bosnia was strategically selected as a base for the development of the military defense industry. This contributed to a large concentration of arms and military personnel in Bosnia; a significant factor in the war that followed the break-up of Yugoslavia in the 1990s. However, Bosnia's existence within Yugoslavia, for the large part, was peaceful and prosperous. Being one of the poorer republics in the early 1950s it quickly recovered economically, taking advantage of its extensive natural resources to stimulate industrial development. The Yugoslavian communist doctrine of "brotherhood and unity" particularly suited Bosnia's diverse and multi-ethnic society that, because of such an imposed system of tolerance, thrived culturally and socially. The improvements to cultural tolerance throughout Bosnia and Herzegovina culminated with the selection of Sarajevo to host the 1984 Winter Olympics.

=== Politics ===
Though considered a political backwater of the federation for much of the 50s and 60s, the 70s saw the ascension of a strong Bosnian political elite. While working within the communist system, politicians such as Džemal Bijedić, Branko Mikulić and Hamdija Pozderac reinforced and protected the sovereignty of Bosnia and Herzegovina. Their efforts proved key during the turbulent period following Tito's death in 1980, and are today considered some of the early steps towards Bosnian independence. However, the republic hardly escaped the increasingly nationalistic climate of the time unscathed.

Following the death of Tito in 1980, rising nationalist ideas primarily noted in Serbian academia, pressured Bosnia to deal with allegations of rising nationalism in their own society. One of the most controversial events that were taken by a Bosnian political leadership was a so-called Sarajevo process in 1983 where, under significant pressure from Serbia's political leadership, Bosnian political elite used their influence to secure convictions for several Bosniak nationalists as a type of a political sacrifice to gain political points in the fight against Serbian nationalists.

The Sarajevo process centered on convicting Alija Izetbegović for writing "The Islamic Declaration", a literary work which was in the Yugoslav communist regime considered a radical approach towards socialist ideals of former Yugoslavia that were based on suppression of nationalism and any violation of that doctrine was punishable by law. Such trials in the communist regime were quite common and a typical practice of suppressing the right to free speech. Bosnian politicians used this practice to reaffirm their political opposition to Serbian nationalist tendencies and in particular opposition to the politics of Slobodan Milošević who was trying to revert the constitutional amendments of the 1970s that awarded the Bosniaks the status of a constituent ethnicity.

The process also backfired as the Serbian lobby insisted that Bosnia was a "dark nation" where all those who oppose the government will be prosecuted, where Bosnian Muslim communists were prosecuting Muslim believers. That kind of propaganda attracted many Bosnian Muslims to their way of thinking. Others were interpreting the Sarajevo process as a way of removing the political amateurs who could end up disrupting the process of Bosnian independence.

=== The pre-war situation in Bosnia and Herzegovina ===
With the fall of communism and the start of the break-up of Yugoslavia, the old communist doctrine of tolerance began to lose its strength, creating an opportunity for nationalist elements in the society to spread their influence.

On the first multi-party elections that took place in November 1990 in Bosnia and Herzegovina, the three largest ethnic parties in the country won: the Bosniak Party of Democratic Action, the Serbian Democratic Party and the Croatian Democratic Union of Bosnia and Herzegovina. After the elections, they formed a coalition government.

Parties shared power along the ethnic lines so that the President of the Presidency of the Socialist Republic of Bosnia and Herzegovina was a Bosniak, president of the Parliament was a Bosnian Serb and the prime minister a Bosnian Croat.

=== Towards separation ===
After Slovenia and Croatia declared independence from the Socialist Federal Republic of Yugoslavia in 1991, Bosnia and Herzegovina declared its sovereignty in October 1991 and organized a referendum on independence in March 1992. The decision of the Parliament of the Socialist Republic of Bosnia and Herzegovina on holding the referendum was taken after the majority of Bosnian Serb members had left the assembly in protest.

These Bosnian Serb assembly members invited the Bosnian Serb population to boycott the referendum held on 29 February and 1 March 1992. The turnout in the referendum was 64-67% and the vote was 98% in favor of independence. Independence was declared on 5 March 1992 by the parliament. The referendum and the murder of two Bosnian Serb members of a wedding procession in Sarajevo the day prior to the referendum was utilized by the Bosnian Serb political leadership as a reason to start road blockades in protest. Further political and social deterioration followed, leading to the Bosnian War.

The Socialist Republic of Bosnia and Herzegovina was renamed the Republic of Bosnia and Herzegovina on 8 April 1992, losing the adjective "Socialist". It began moving toward a fully capitalist economic system. The republic retained socialist realist symbols pending the end of the Yugoslav Wars. The republic was led by Alija Izetbegović in a fractious political environment. In 1992, the Republic declared independence from the Socialist Federal Republic of Yugoslavia.

== Heads of institutions ==
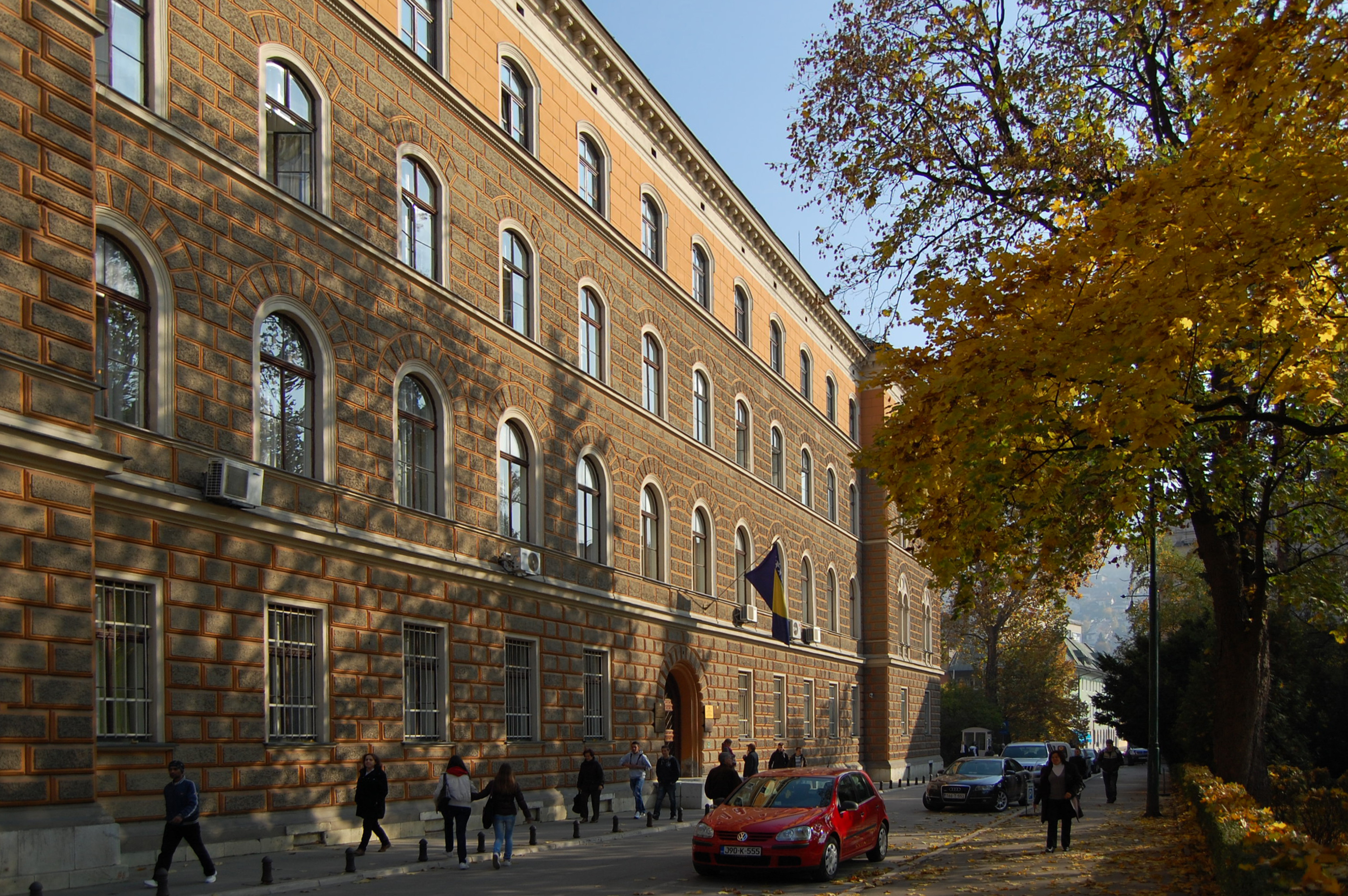
The Presidency Building in central Sarajevo

=== Chairmen ===
- Chairman of the Anti-Fascist Council of People's Liberation of Bosnia and Herzegovina
  - Vojislav Kecmanović (25 November 1943 – 26 April 1945)
- Chairmen of the Presidium of the People's Assembly
  - Vojislav Kecmanović (26 April 1945 – November 1946)
  - Đuro Pucar (November 1946 – September 1948)
  - Vlado Šegrt (September 1948 – March 1953)
- Chairmen of the People's Assembly
  - Đuro Pucar (December 1953 – June 1963)
  - Ratomir Dugonjić (June 1963 – July 1967)
  - Džemal Bijedić (1967 – July 1971)
  - Hamdija Pozderac (July 1971 – May 1974)
- Chairmen of the Presidency
  - Ratomir Dugonjić (May 1974 – April 1978)
  - Raif Dizdarević (April 1978 – April 1982)
  - Branko Mikulić (April 1982 – 26 April 1984)
  - Milanko Renovica (26 April 1984 – 26 April 1985)
  - Munir Mesihović (26 April 1985 – April 1987)
  - Mato Andrić (April 1987 – April 1988)
  - Nikola Filipović (April 1988 – April 1989)
  - Obrad Piljak (April 1989 – 20 December 1990)
  - Alija Izetbegović (20 December 1990 – 8 April 1992)

=== Prime Ministers ===
- Prime Minister for Bosnia and Herzegovina (part of Yugoslav Government)
  - Rodoljub Čolaković (7 March 1945 – 27 April 1945)
- Prime Ministers
  - Rodoljub Čolaković (27 April 1945 – September 1948)
  - Đuro Pucar (September 1948 – March 1953)
- Chairmen of the Executive Council
  - Đuro Pucar (March 1953 – December 1953)
  - Avdo Humo (December 1953 – 1956)
  - Osman Karabegović (1956–1963)
  - Hasan Brkić (1963–1965)
  - Rudi Kolak (1965–1967)
  - Branko Mikulić (1967–1969)
  - Dragutin Kosovac (1969 – April 1974)
  - Milanko Renovica (April 1974 – 28 April 1982)
  - Seid Maglajlija (28 April 1982 – 28 April 1984)
  - Gojko Ubiparip (28 April 1984 – April 1986)
  - Josip Lovrenović (April 1986 – April 1988)
  - Marko Ceranić (April 1988 – 20 December 1990)
  - Jure Pelivan (20 December 1990 – 8 April 1992)
