= Darinka Jandrić =

Bosnian-Serbian centenarian

- Darinka Jandrić in her Yugoslav Partisan uniform
- Born: Darinka (Tomo) Krivokapić; 17 December 1910; Aranđelovo, Bosnia and Herzegovina, Austria-Hungary
- Died: 4 February 2019 (aged 108 years, 49 days); Belgrade, Serbia
- Citizenship: Austria-Hungary; Kingdom of Yugoslavia; Socialist Federal Republic of Yugoslavia; Serbia and Montenegro; Serbia
- Occupation: Division nurse in the People's Liberation Army of Yugoslavia during World War II
- Political party: Communist Party of Yugoslavia
- Spouse: Dušan Jandrić
- Children: 2

Darinka Jandrić (Serbian Cyrillic: Даринка Јандрић, née Krivokapić; 17 December 1910 – 4 February 2019) was a Bosnian-Serbian nurse who participated in the Second World War in Yugoslavia as part of the Yugoslav Partisans. She was proclaimed a national heroine of Yugoslavia after the war. She was also a centenarian, and at the time of her death, the oldest living person in Serbia.

== Biography ==
Darinka Jandrić was born under the name Darinka (Tomo) Krivokapić in Aranđelovo, Austria-Hungary (now Bosnia and Herzegovina) on 17 December 1910. She was one of five children.

At the age of 4, under the influence of the First World War, she moved with her family to Peja, and shortly afterwards to Nikšić. She remembered the tragedy that befell her family when they set fire to their house and drove them away. Her parents wanted their children to be educated, so she finished primary school and on the initiative of her neighbor Vlado Šegrt, school for nurses.

Most of her family was murdered by Ustaše at the start of the Second World War. Although she left Aranđelovo with the 10th Herzegovinian Brigade of Yugoslav Partisans, she moved between brigades during the war and found herself in the 3rd and 5th Proletarian Brigades, and finally in Danilo Komnenović's division. She was decorated with the Commemorative Medal of the Partisans of 1941, the Order of Merit for the People with silver rays, the Order of Brotherhood and Unity with a silver wreath and the Order of Bravery. As a division nurse, she participated in the battles on the Neretva and Sutjeska.

After the war, she met Dušan Jandrić, also a bearer of the Commemorative Medal from 1941. She gave birth to two children, Rajko and Vukosava. In addition to the two children that Dušan and Darinka had, she also raised his children from previous marriages.

She has lived in Belgrade since 1962 in her family house in Banjica, which she built alone with her husband Dušan. She was a member of the Association of Trebinje Residents in Belgrade. She retired with a rank of a Senior sergeant in the Yugoslav Ground Forces.

In 2017, during a guest appearance on Herceg TV, she said that she was not afraid of war, and that she was guided by the slogan: "If I die, I will die!". She led a quiet and secluded life, she never wanted to be exposed in the media, except for the show for Herceg TV, in which she was the only guest, since she was born in this region. She spent the last years of her life with the daily care of her children Rajko and Vukosava, with her daughter in the apartment of her son-in-law Nebojša.

Darinka died in Belgrade, Serbia on 4 February 2019 at the age of 108 years, 48 days. She was buried on 7 February 2019, with military honors at the Belgrade New Cemetery. Following her death, the new oldest person in Serbia became Nadežda Pavlović, two years younger.
