= People's Assembly of Bosnia and Herzegovina =

The People's Assembly of Bosnia and Herzegovina was the legislature of the People's Republic of Bosnia and Herzegovina, formed on 26 April 1945.

== Presidents of the People's Assembly (1953–1992) ==
No.	Portrait	Name (Birth–Death)	Term of Office		Party
1		Đuro Pucar (1899–1979)	December 1953	June 1963	SK BiH
2		Ratomir Dugonjić (1916–1987)	June 1963	1967	SK BiH
3		Džemal Bijedić (1917–1977)	1967	30 July 1971	SK BiH
4		Hamdija Pozderac (1924–1988)	30 July 1971	1978	SK BiH
5		Niko Mihaljević	1978	1981	SK BiH
6		Vaso Gačić	1981	1983	SK BiH
7		Ivica Blažević	1983	1984	SK BiH
8		Salko Oruč	1984	1987	SK BiH
9		Savo Čečur	1987	1989	SK BiH
10		Zlatan Karavdić	1989	20 December 1990	SK BiH
11		Momčilo Krajišnik (1945–2020)	20 December 1990	3 March 1992	SDS
