= Osman Karabegović =

- Осман Карабеговић

1st President of the Economic Chamber of the Federal Assembly of Yugoslavia
- In office June 29, 1963 – May 16, 1967
- Preceded by: None (office established)
- Succeeded by: Petar Zecević

3rd President of the Executive Council of the People's Republic of Bosnia and Herzegovina
- In office 1956–1963
- Preceded by: Avdo Humo
- Succeeded by: Hasan Brkić

Personal details
- Born: 7 September 1911 Banja Luka, Bosnia and Herzegovina, Austria-Hungary
- Died: 24 June 1996 (aged 84) Belgrade, Serbia, FR Yugoslavia
- Citizenship: Yugoslav
- Party: League of Communists of Yugoslavia (1932–1974)
- Spouse: Ljubica Karabegović
- Profession: Politician, soldier
- Awards: Order of the People's Hero; Order of the People's Liberation; Order of the Yugoslav Flag; Order of the Partisan Star; Order of Bravery; Partisan Memorial

Military service
- Allegiance: Yugoslavia
- Branch/service: Yugoslav Partisans
- Years of service: 1941–1945
- Rank: Major General

Osman Karabegović (Serbo-Croatian Cyrillic: Осман Карабеговић; 7 September 1911 – 24 June 1996) was a Yugoslav and Bosnian communist politician and a recipient of the Order of the People's Hero. He joined the Communist Party of Yugoslavia in 1932.

During World War II, he was one of the leaders of the Yugoslav Partisans in Bosnia-Herzegovina. After the war, he held various posts in the Socialist Yugoslavia.

In 1972, after he criticized the Yugoslav model of workers' self-management and the lack of democracy in the Socialist Republic of Bosnia and Herzegovina, he was expelled from the League of Communists of Yugoslavia.

He died in Belgrade in 1996.

== Early life ==
Karabegović was born on 7 September 1911 in Banja Luka. He attended high school there and was an active member of the "Mlada Jugoslavija" association (English: Young Yugoslavia).

He joined the Communist Party of Yugoslavia in 1932 and in the same year was expelled from school because he participated in a students' strike. He finished the last of his classes of gymnasium in Sarajevo.

Because of his activity in the Communist Party and SKOJ he was arrested. He was released from prison under the pressure of public. In 1933, Karabegović entered the Veterinary Faculty in Zagreb.

Again, he actively participated in the work of SKOJ and the Communist Party. He was arrested for the same reasons a few times by police in Zagreb. In 1935 he was ordered to return in Banja Luka.

During 1936–37 he studied medicine at the University of Zagreb and became a member of the Students' Committee of SKOJ and a member of the Action Committee in Belgrade.

He participated in various demonstrations against the regime of Alexander I of Yugoslavia for which he was again arrested a few times.

== World War II ==
After World War II started in Yugoslavia, Karabegović returned to Banja Luka and became a member of the Regional Committee of the Communist Party of Yugoslavia for Bosanska Krajina.

He participated in organizing a rebellion against the Axis forces on 4 July 1941 in Šehitluci near Banja Luka. This was the final agreement by the Communists to begin a rebellion in Bosanska Krajina.

In the second half of June 1941 Karabegović visited Prijedor, Bosanski Novi, Krupa and Bihać where he held a few meetings with Partisan military officers and the Party's committees and transferred decisions made by the Communist Party about plans of a rebellion.

In the beginning of July 1941, Karabegović, along with Josip Mažar Šoša, visited Bosanski Petrovac and Dvor and formed committees in preparation for the rebellion.

On the day when the rebellion started, 25 July 1941, Karabegović participated in consultations at Orlovci near Prijedor where the Communist Party made a schedule for the rebellion. Karabegović was sent along with Dr Mladen Stojanović and Josip Mažar Šoša to Kozara for organizing the rebellion.

In August 1941, when the Second Detachment of Bosanska Krajina was formed, Karabegović became its political commissar. In the beginning of November 1941, Karabegović participated in military consultations held in the Partisan Supreme Command for Bosnia and Herzegovina of Romanija. He was one of the organizers of the regional party's consultations in Bosanska Krajina which was held on 22 February 1942 in Kneževo.

In those consultations, Karabegović became a political commissar of the Operational Headquarters for Bosanska Krajina, and when the First Bosnian Corps was formed at the end of 1942, he continued the same duties there.

Throughout the war, Karabegović held various posts, he was the Secretary of the Regional Committee of the Communist Party of Yugoslavia for Bosanska Krajina, a member of the Regional Committee for Communist Party of Yugoslavia and a member of the Supreme Command of the Yugoslav Partisans for Bosnia and Herzegovina. He was also an alderman in the First and Second Session of the AVNOJ and in all of the sessions of ZAVNOBiH.

== Communist Yugoslavia ==
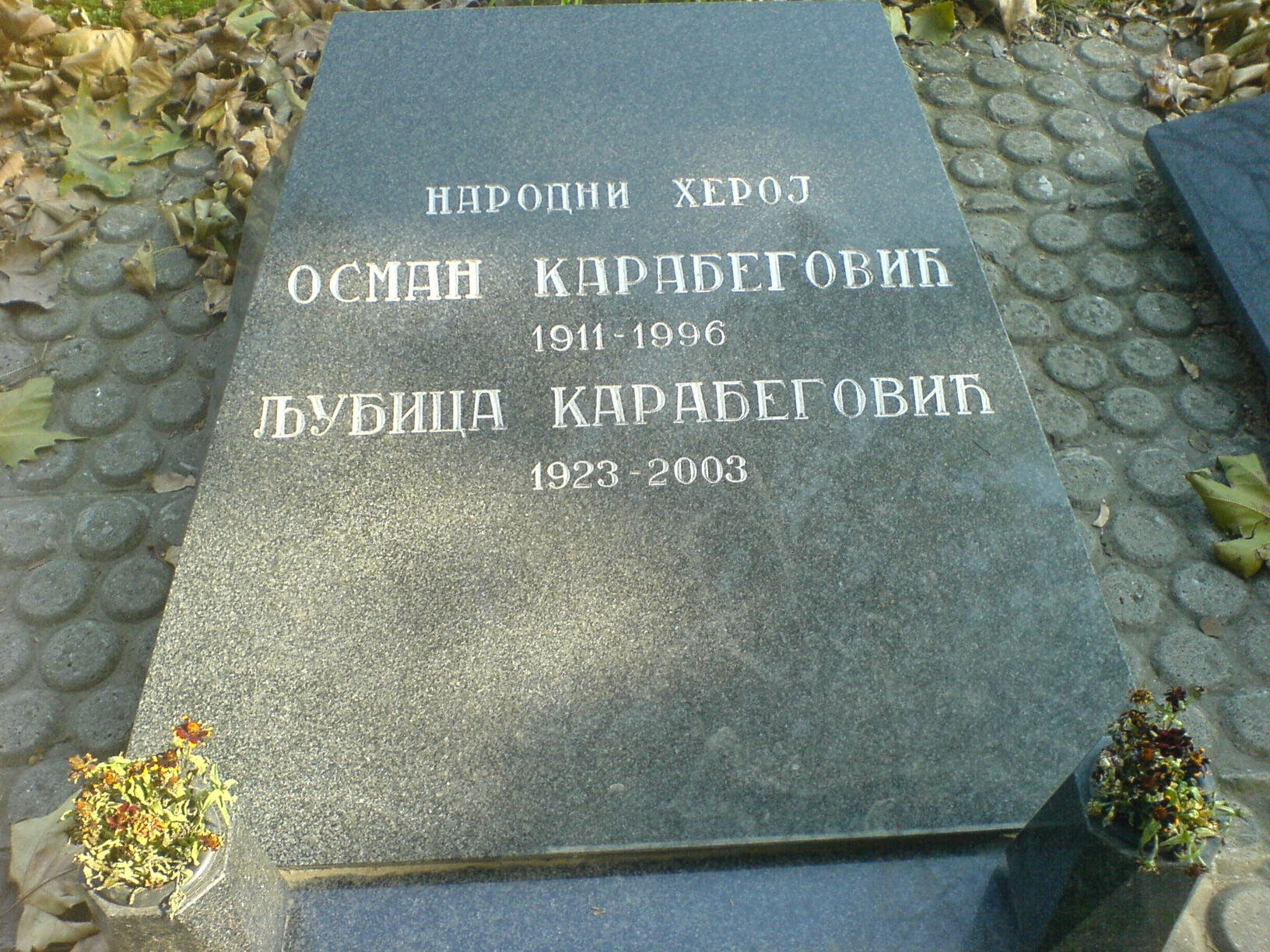
Osman Karabegović's grave in Belgrade

After the war he held various posts. From 1946 to 1974 he was the envoy of the Assembly of the Federal People's Republic of Yugoslavia and from 1947 to 1956 he was a member of the Federal Government. Karabegović was also the President of the Executive Council of the People's Republic of Bosnia and Herzegovina (de facto Prime Minister) from 1956 to 1963. Karabegović was a member of the Central Committee of the League of Communists, and from 1966 he was a member of the Presidency of the Central Committee of the League of Communists of Yugoslavia. On 23 July 1952 he became a recipient of the People's Hero of Yugoslavia.

In September 1972 Karabegović criticised the communist leadership in the Socialist Republic of Bosnia and Herzegovina and the Yugoslav model of workers' self-management as staging while the highest ranking individuals controlled public life completely. He also criticised the lack of democracy, saying that none of the members of the Executive Council of the SR Bosnia and Herzegovina would be elected if there was a democratic system. Older members of the communist leadership were critical of transformation towards close-society, while the younger members saw it as the only way to transform Bosnia and Herzegovina. All critics, including Karabegović, were expelled from the League of Communists.

=== In Milošević's Serbia ===
Osman Karabegović was a strong supporter of policies of Slobodan Milošević in 1980s and 1990s. He opposed Alija Izetbegović claiming that there was more "order and lawfulness" in the times of the Ottoman Empire, Austria-Hungary and the Kingdom of Yugoslavia than during the "dictatorship of the enraged Izetbegović's fundamentalist bandits".

On 24 June 1996, Karabegović died in Belgrade and was buried in the Alley of the People's Heroes in Novo groblje.

== Private life ==
Karabegovic was married to his wife Ljubica until his death in 1996. Their son Enes Karabegović was Ambassador of Yugoslavia to Iraq. According to a popular theory, he shared a mutual dislike with Avdo Humo.

== Works ==
- Karabegović, Osman (1978). Krajina na putevima revolucije (in Serbo-Croatian). Belgrade: Glas.
- Karabegović, Osman (1988). Bosanska krajina: nepresušni izvor revolucionarnih snaga (in Serbo-Croatian). Belgrade: Vojnoizdavački i novinski centar.
