= Srđan Dizdarević =

Bosnian journalist, diplomat, and human rights activist

- Born: 29 September 1952; Sarajevo, PR Bosnia and Herzegovina, SFR Yugoslavia
- Died: 16 February 2016 (aged 63); Sarajevo, Bosnia and Herzegovina
- Resting place: Bare Cemetery, Sarajevo
- Spouse: Dubravka (m. 1972; died 2015)
- Relatives: Raif Dizdarević (uncle); Zija Dizdarević (uncle)

Srđan Dizdarević (29 September 1952 – 16 February 2016) was a Bosnian journalist, diplomat, and activist. Born into a prominent Bosniak political family of diplomats, Dizdarević graduated from the Faculty of Philosophy at the University of Sarajevo in 1976 and entered politics. As a diplomat, he was the first secretary of the Embassy of Yugoslavia in Paris, and in 1991 he returned to Bosnia and Herzegovina. He also worked as the assistant editor-in-chief of the newspaper Oslobođenje and was a member of the Helsinki Committee for Human Rights of Bosnia and Herzegovina from 1995, becoming the committee's president in 2005, serving until 2014. He died of severe pneumonia in 2016.

== Early life ==
Srđan Dizdarević was born on 29 September 1952 in Sarajevo, Bosnia and Herzegovina, while the country was a Yugoslav republic. He stems from a prominent Bosnian anti-fascist family of Bosniak heritage, whose members are former politicians and diplomats. His father Nijaz Dizdarević was a former ambassador to Baghdad, Algiers and Paris; his uncle Faik Dizdarević was a longtime ambassador to Tehran, Algiers and Madrid; and his other uncle Raif Dizdarević was a foreign minister of Yugoslavia and the president of the Presidency of both socialist Bosnia and Herzegovina and Yugoslavia. A third uncle, Zija Dizdarević, was a prominent Bosnian writer.

Srđan Dizdarević graduated in 1976 from the Faculty of Philosophy at the University of Sarajevo. and studied political science in Paris. During his university years he was responsible for the international relations of the Young Socialists' Association.

== Career ==
=== Journalistic career ===
For a decade he was a professional journalist. In 1978 he worked as director and editor in chief of the "children and youth press" branch of the daily Oslobodjenje; since 1981 he was assistant chief editor of the Oslobođenje.

=== Diplomatic career ===
After the death of Tito, since his family name was becoming a liability, he looked for a period abroad. A perfect francophone, from 1987 to 1991 Dizdarević worked in the Yugoslav foreign service as First Secretary of the Embassy of Yugoslavia in Paris, until when – he said – "it became impossible to work for an embassy of Greater Serbia".

=== In Sarajevo during the siege ===
He got back to Sarajevo on 2 April 1992, four days before the start of the war. He spent the three-year siege of Sarajevo in the town, refusing all offers to leave it: "there were moments in which I thought that Sarajevo only had one chance over hundreds to survive. But that single chance sufficed," he later declared to Libération.

=== Human rights activist ===
After the Bosnian war, in 1995, he got engaged in civil society initiatives. He is remembered as "a prominent defender of human rights and freedoms in BiH, a sharp critic of crime and corruption and determined advocate of peace and coexistence."

He was elected the first president of the Helsinki Committee for Human Rights of Bosnia and Herzegovina in 2005, a position he held until 2014; he was also a member of the Association of Independent Intellectuals Circle 99; The following year he was elected member of the Executive Committee of the International Helsinki Federation and elected member of the Presidency of the Civic Alternative Parliament. In 1997 he was appointed as a member of the Alternative Ministerial Council – Minister for Foreign Affairs.

He declared to the Serbian daily Naša Borba in 1997:

The Dayton accords admit no alternative. This is why we need to gather all non-nationalist forces, since they are the only ones that can assure the build-up of a normal Bosnia and Herzegovina.

In 1998 Dizdarević was appointed as a member of the Provisional Election Commission, and as a member of the Independent Media Commission. The same year, a decision of the High Representative for Bosnia and Herzegovina appointed him to the working group on the Permanent Election Law.

In 2005 he wrote:

The nationalist parties are blocking all evolution of the country, in fear of losing power. The religious authorities support them, and those that oppose nationalism, the emerging civil society, still don't have enough weight to make themselves be heard. (...) There is no democracy in Bosnia and Herzegovina, not even at Constitutional level, since the inhabitants of the country are not considered as citizens, but as members of predetermined ethnic community.

Following his engagement for a civic and non-nationalist Bosnia and Herzegovina, in 2008 he took part together with director Danis Tanović in the launch of the Naša Stranka party, which nevertheless remained marginal in the following elections.

== Personal life ==
Srđan Dizdarević married Dubravka Doda on 12 August 1972. She preceded him in death by seven months, dying on 18 July 2015. Together they had two children, daughter Sandra and son Davorin.

=== Death ===
Dizdarević died at age 63 of severe pneumonia in Sarajevo on 16 February 2016. He was buried 20 February 2016 in Sarajevo's Bare Cemetery.
