= Kecmanović =

Kecmanović (Serbian Cyrillic: Кецмановић) is a Serbo-Croatian surname. Notable people with the surname include:

- Miomir Kecmanović (born 1999), Serbian tennis player
- Nenad Kecmanović (born 1947), Bosnian Serb political scientist, sociologist, political analyst, publicist and retired politician
- Vojislav Kecmanović (1881–1961), first President of the Republic of Bosnia and Herzegovina
- Kosta Kecmanović (born 2009), Belgrade mass shooter
