= Raif Dizdarević =

10th President of the Presidency of Yugoslavia (1926–2026)

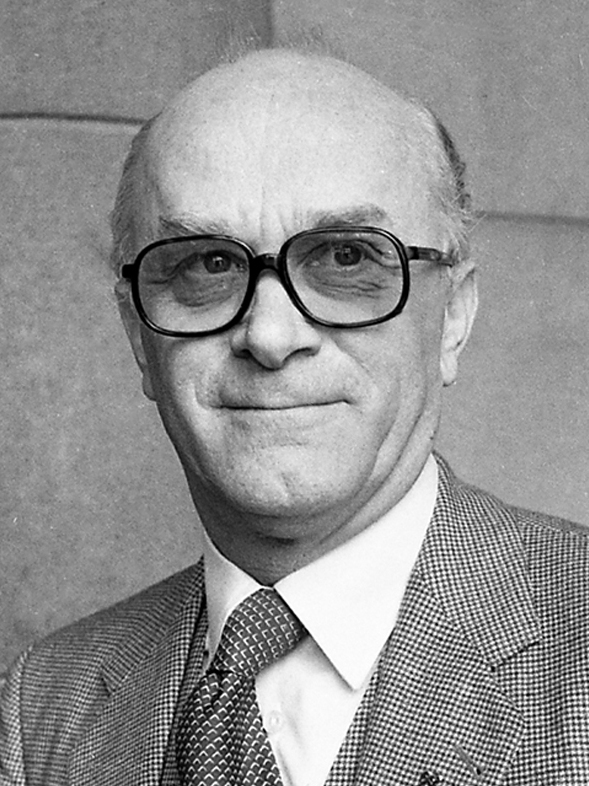

President of the Presidency of Yugoslavia
- In office 15 May 1988 – 15 May 1989
- Prime Minister: Branko Mikulić; Ante Marković
- Preceded by: Lazar Mojsov
- Succeeded by: Janez Drnovšek

Member of the Presidency of Yugoslavia for SR Bosnia and Herzegovina
- In office 31 December 1987 – 15 May 1989
- Preceded by: Mato Andrić (Acting member); Hamdija Pozderac (Member)
- Succeeded by: Bogić Bogićević

Minister of Foreign Affairs
- In office 15 May 1984 – 30 December 1987
- Prime Minister: Milka Planinc; Branko Mikulić
- Preceded by: Lazar Mojsov
- Succeeded by: Budimir Lončar

President of the Presidency of SR Bosnia and Herzegovina
- In office April 1978 – April 1982
- Prime Minister: Milanko Renovica
- Preceded by: Ratomir Dugonjić
- Succeeded by: Branko Mikulić

Personal details
- Born: 9 December 1926 Fojnica, Kingdom of Serbs, Croats and Slovenes
- Died: 2 September 2026 (aged 99) Sarajevo, Bosnia and Herzegovina
- Party: League of Communists of Yugoslavia (1945–1991)
- Relations: Zija Dizdarević (brother); Srđan Dizdarević (nephew)

Raif Dizdarević (9 December 1926 – 2 September 2026) was a Yugoslav–Bosnian politician who served as Yugoslavia's first Bosnian Muslim president of the Presidency from 1988 to 1989. He participated in the armed resistance as a Yugoslav Partisan during World War II. Dizdarević also served as President of the Presidency of SR Bosnia and Herzegovina and as Minister of Foreign Affairs. He was the brother of Zija Dizdarević.

== Early life ==
Dizdarević was born in Fojnica on 9 December 1926, into a Bosnian Muslim family, but stopped practising Islam after entering primary school. He had seven brothers.

During royal Yugoslavia, some of his brothers were arrested due to membership in the Communist Party, Socialist Youth, and Progressive Syndicate Movement. All seven brothers joined the Yugoslav Partisans during World War II in Yugoslavia. Raif joined at 17 years old. Three of his brothers, Nusret, Zija and Hasan, were killed during the war.

== Political career ==
After the war, as a member of the Communist Party, Dizdarević was elevated into higher-ranking political functions. From 1945, he was a member of the State Security Administration. As a diplomat, he served in embassies in Bulgaria (1951–1954), the Soviet Union (1956–1959), and Czechoslovakia (1963–1967).

Dizdarević was an assistant Federal Secretary of Foreign Affairs, with Miloš Minić being the minister. From April 1978 until April 1982, he was the President of the Presidency of SR Bosnia and Herzegovina, after which he served as President of the Federal Assembly of Yugoslavia.

From 15 May 1984 until 30 December 1987, Dizdarević was the Minister of Foreign Affairs. On 15 May 1988, he became President of the Presidency of Yugoslavia, following the resignation of Hamdija Pozderac. During Dizdarević's time as head of state, Yugoslavia had a foreign debt of over US$21 billion and an annual inflation rate of 217 percent. In March 1989, Dizdarević had to cancel a foreign trip to Brazil, Uruguay and Senegal amid unrest in the Albanian-majority province of Kosovo.

== Writing career ==
Dizdarević, who tried to keep the Yugoslav federation together, lost his political influence with the start of the Yugoslav Wars. Later he lived in Sarajevo and published his memoirs, From the death of Tito to the death of Yugoslavia (Bosnian: Od smrti Tita do smrti Jugoslavije), and a book of memories on events and personalities called Times to be remembered (Bosnian: Vrijeme koje se pamti).

== Personal life and death ==
His son Predrag lives in the United States, while his daughter Jasminka lives in Belgrade, Serbia. His nephew was the journalist, diplomat, and activist Srđan Dizdarević, who died in 2016. Dizdarević died in Sarajevo on 2 September 2026, at the age of 99.

== See also ==
- List of deputy heads of state of Yugoslavia

== Sources ==
- Račić, Milan (26 September 2025), Raif Dizdarević, dobar čovjek u visokoj politici, Tacno

Political offices
| Preceded by Lazar Mojsov | President of the Presidency of SFR Yugoslavia; 1988–1989 | Succeeded by Janez Drnovšek |
| Preceded by Ratomir Dugonjić | President of the Presidency of SR Bosnia and Herzegovina; 1978–1982 | Succeeded by Branko Mikulić |
