= Vojislav Kecmanović =

- Војислав Кецмановић
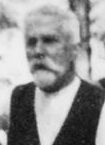

1st President of the Presidency of the People's Assembly of the People's Republic of Bosnia and Herzegovina
- In office 26 April 1945 – November 1946
- Preceded by: Office established
- Succeeded by: Đuro Pucar

Personal details
- Born: 12 August 1881 Čitluk (Kozarska Dubica), Bosnia and Herzegovina, Austria-Hungary
- Died: 25 March 1961 (aged 79) Sarajevo, PR Bosnia and Herzegovina, FPR Yugoslavia
- Party: SKJ
- Occupation: Doctor, politician

Vojislav "Đedo" Kecmanović (12 August 1881 – 25 March 1961) was a Serb doctor who participated in the Balkan Wars and the National Liberation Struggle. He was the first President of the Presidency of the People's Assembly of People's Republic of Bosnia and Herzegovina and was also president of ZAVNOBiH.

== Early life and education ==
Kecmanović was born in Čitluk, near Prijedor, on 12 August 1881. He attended high school in Sarajevo, Reljevo and Karlowitz. He studied medicine from 1905 to 1911 in Prague where he graduated. While working as a doctor in Tuzla during the Balkan Wars, he crossed into the Kingdom of Serbia and participated in it as a volunteer.

== Career ==
After the Balkan Wars, Kecmanović returned to Tuzla, and then lived in Sarajevo. In Banja Luka, he was sentenced to five years in prison for high-treason process, serving his sentence in Banja Luka and Zenica. In 1918, he was a doctor in Bijeljina. Kecmanović was president of the cultural-educational societies and reading rooms "Filip Višnjić" and was also a distinguished cultural worker. In 1943, he was elected member of the Anti-Fascist Council for the National Liberation of Yugoslavia and also became president of ZAVNOBiH, the highest governing organ of the anti-fascist movement in Bosnia and Herzegovina and during World War II developed to be the bearer of Bosnian statehood.

From 26 April 1945 to November 1946, Kecmanović was the first head of state of the People's Republic of Bosnia and Herzegovina.

== Death ==
Kecmanović died on 25 March 1961 in Sarajevo, PR Bosnia and Herzegovina, FPR Yugoslavia.

Political offices
Preceded by Office established	President of the Presidency of the People's Assembly of the People's Republic of Bosnia and Herzegovina; 1945–1946	Succeeded by Đuro Pucar
