= Economic Chamber of the Federal Assembly of Yugoslavia =

The Economic Council was one of the five houses of the Federal Assembly of the Socialist Federal Republic of Yugoslavia from 1963 to 1974. It was a council of delegates of working people in working communities, and also existed at the level of the socialist republics (i.e. the six constituent republics of Yugoslavia).

== Composition ==
The Economic Council had 120 deputies. Deputy candidates were proposed by workers in the working communities of the respective field of work. Every worker or member of the management body of a working organization or working community in the respective field of work, a member of the management body of an association of working organizations and a trade union official in the respective field of work had the right to be elected as a member of the Economic Council. A candidate who was elected by a majority determined by law in the municipal assembly or municipal assemblies became a deputy.

== Presidents of the Chamber ==
The president of the Economic Chamber was the presiding officer of the Economic Chamber of the Federal Assembly of Yugoslavia.

- Osman Karabegović (June 29, 1963 – May 16, 1967)
- Petar Zecević (May 16, 1967 – May 15, 1969)
- Vasil Grivčev (May 15, 1969 – May 16, 1974)

== Sources ==
- Various editions of The Europa World Year Book
