= Kesići =

Kesići Кесићи
- Village
- Location within Bosnia and Herzegovina
- Coordinates: 44°11′34″N 16°22′44″E
- Country: Bosnia and Herzegovina
- Entity: Federation of Bosnia and Herzegovina
- Canton: Canton 10
- Municipality: Bosansko Grahovo

Area
  - Total: 1.90 sq mi (4.92 km^{2})

Population (2013)
  - Total: 43
  - Density: 23/sq mi (8.7/km^{2})
- Time zone: UTC+1 (CET)
  - Summer (DST): UTC+2 (CEST)

Kesići (Serbian Cyrillic: Кесићи) is a village in the Bosansko Grahovo in Canton 10 of the Federation of Bosnia and Herzegovina, an entity of Bosnia and Herzegovina.

== Demographics ==
According to the 2013 census, its population was 43.

Ethnicity in 2013
Ethnicity	Number	Percentage
Serbs	42	97.7%
other/undeclared	1	2.3%
Total	43	100%

== Notable residents ==
- Đuro Pucar

== Bibliography ==
- Ethnicity/National Affiliation, Religion and Mother Tongue (PDF). Sarajevo: Agency for Statistics of Bosnia and Herzegovina. 2019.
