= Obrad Piljak =

Bosnian politician (1933–2013)

9th President of the Presidency of the Socialist Republic of Bosnia and Herzegovina
- In office April 1989 – 20 December 1990
- Prime Minister: Marko Ćeranić
- Preceded by: Nikola Filipović
- Succeeded by: Alija Izetbegović

Personal details
- Born: 4 December 1933 Petrovo Vrelo, Yugoslavia
- Died: 1 April 2013 (aged 79)
- Party: SKJ
- Occupation: Politician

Obrad Piljak (Bosnian pronunciation: [ǒbraːt pǐːʎak]; 4 December 1933 – 7 April 2013) was a Bosnian politician and the former president of the Presidency of Bosnia and Herzegovina, who served his term from April 1989 to December 1990. He was the last person to be a nominated (non-elected) member of the League of Communists of Bosnia and Herzegovina that served as the chairman of the collective head of state, before the first multi-party elections were held in 1990. Alija Izetbegović soon replaced him in his post.

Obrad Piljak was born in 1933 in Petrovo Vrelo, Glamoč. He holds a Ph.D. degree in economics. Before his political era, he worked at the banking sector with the Central Bank of Bosnia and Herzegovina.

Piljak was also a part of the advisory board of the Federal Banking Agency of Bosnia and Herzegovina. He was a former associate professor at the Faculty of economics in the University of Sarajevo. Piljak died in 2013, aged 79.

Political offices
| Preceded by Nikola Filipović | Post; President of the Presidency of the Socialist Republic of Bosnia and Herzegovina; 1989–1990 | Succeeded by Alija Izetbegović; President of the Presidency of the Republic of Bosnia and Herzegovina |
