= Zija Dizdarević =

Bosnian writer (1916–1942)

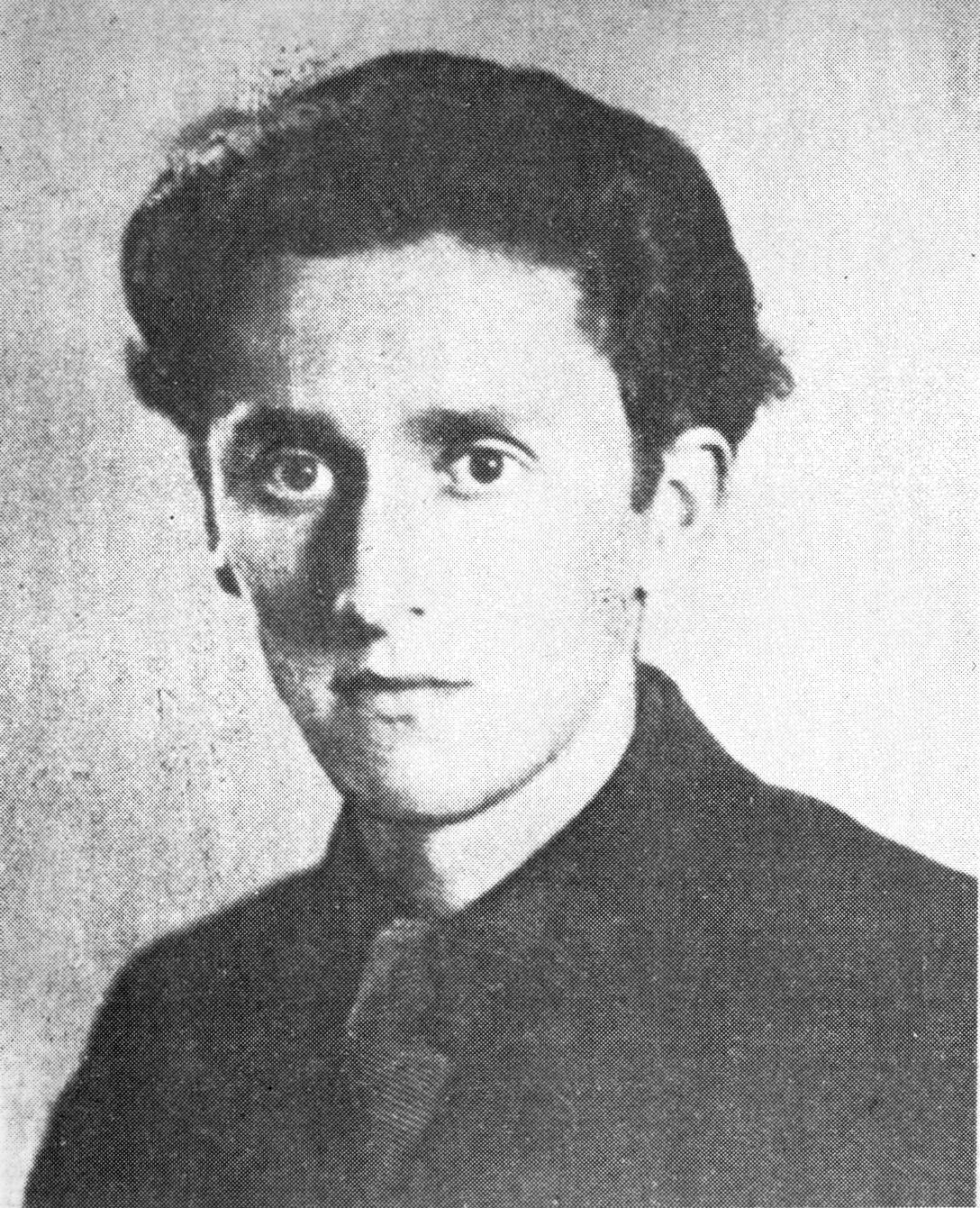
- Born: Zija Dizdarević; 18 February 1916; Fojnica, Austria-Hungary
- Died: 1942 (aged 25–26); Jasenovac, Independent State of Croatia
- Other name: Zijo
- Relatives: Raif Dizdarević (brother); Srđan Dizdarević (nephew)

Zija Dizdarević (18 February 1916 – 1942) was a Yugoslav Bosnian prose writer and brother of Yugoslav politician Raif Dizdarević.

== Biography ==
Dizdarević was born in the village of Vitina in the Ljubuški municipality of Austro-Hungarian Bosnia and Herzegovina, to Bosnian Muslim parents Šefkija Dizdarević and Selima. The family moved in 1920 to Fojnica. There he spent most of his youth and always came back regardless of all the other places he went to. After finishing primary school in Fojnica, he started grammar school in Sarajevo, and finished it in 1936. This is when his literary and political work started.

At that time he managed to publish a few short stories, and was arrested for participating in youth strikes. In 1937 he started studying pedagogy at the University of Belgrade Faculty of Philosophy. His literary works started to appear in many papers, but also his political engagement rose. With the outbreak of World War II in Yugoslavia, he was not yet 25 years old, and he worked for a year in Fojnica and Sarajevo as an operative of the Yugoslav Partisans. In the spring of 1942, just one day prior to his official membership in the Partisan army he was arrested by the Ustashe in Sarajevo and taken to the Jasenovac concentration camp, where he was executed shortly afterwards.

== Works ==
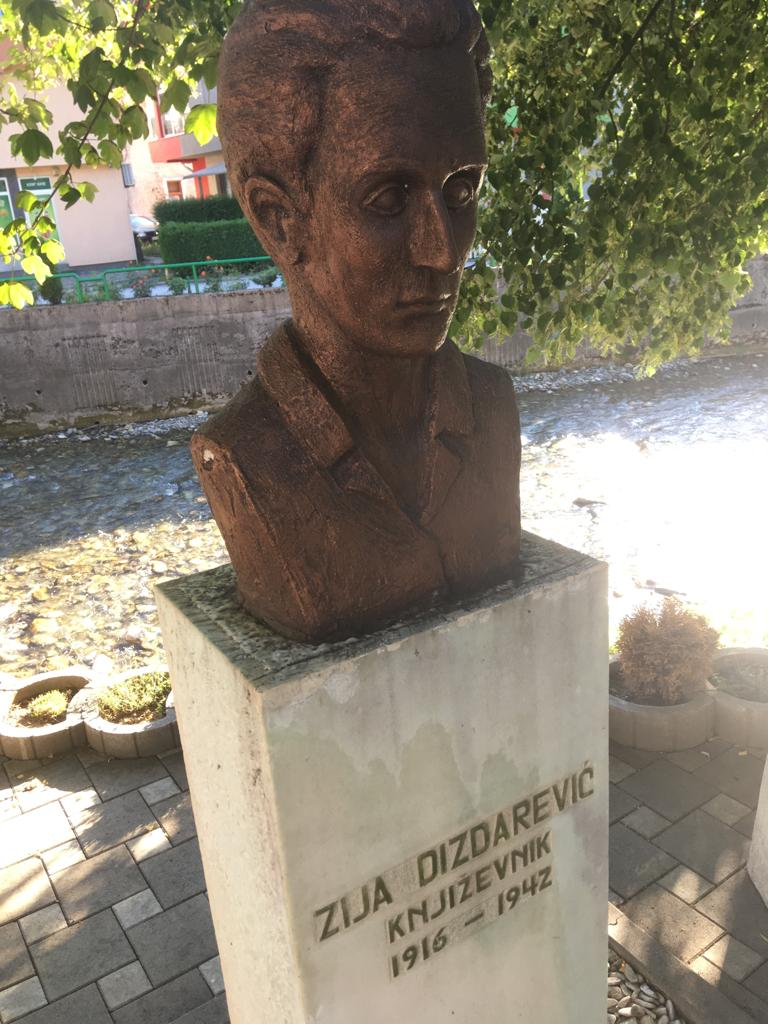
Bust of Zija Dizdarević in Fojnica.

All of Dizdarević's works were published after his death. This is the list of titles and their first editions. The list is in Serbo-Croatian, but possible translations into English are also given. There is no record that any of his works have been translated into English up to the present day.

- Pripovijetke (Svjetlost, Sarajevo, 1948), Short Stories
- Prosanjane jeseni (Džepna knjiga, Sarajevo, 1959), The Autumns That were Dreamt Away
- Sabrana djela (Svjetlost, Sarajevo, 1968), Collected Works
- Blago u duvaru (Zadrugar, Sarajevo, 1983), Treasure in the Wall

Dizdarević's story "Blago u duvaru" was adapted into film under the same name by Aleksandar Jevđević in 1975 for TV Sarajevo.
