= State Anti-fascist Council for the National Liberation of Bosnia and Herzegovina =

World War II-era political body

Anti-fascist Council for the National Liberation of Bosnia and Herzegovina (ZAVNOBiH)

Type
- Type: Unicameral

History
- Founded: 25 November 1943
- Disbanded: 26 April 1945
- Succeeded by: People's Assembly of Bosnia and Herzegovina

Leadership
- President: Vojislav Kecmanović
- Seats: 173 (1943); 197 (1944); 176 (1945)

The State Anti-fascist Council for the National Liberation of Bosnia and Herzegovina (Serbo-Croatian: Zemaljsko antifašističko vijeće narodnog oslobođenja Bosne i Hercegovine, Земаљско антифашистичко виjеће народног ослобођења Босне и Херцеговине), commonly abbreviated as the ZAVNOBiH, was convened on 25 November 1943 in Mrkonjić Grad during the World War II Axis occupation of Yugoslavia. It was established as the highest representative and legislative body in the territory of Bosnia and Herzegovina under control of the Yugoslav Partisans.

Decisions of the second session of the ZAVNOBiH held in Sanski Most in 1944 established statehood of Bosnia and Herzegovina by claiming equal status with the other prospective federated republics in the planned establishment of the Democratic Federal Yugoslavia pursued by the Communist Party of Yugoslavia. The composition of the ZAVNOBiH was meant to represent as wide spectrum of the society as possible and included non-communist members but the communist leadership never relinquished control over the ZAVNOBiH or its bodies. The second session of the ZAVNOBiH adopted the Declaration on Rights of the Citizens of Bosnia and Herzegovina recognising equality of Serbs and Croats of Bosnia and Herzegovina with the Muslim population of the nascent Yugoslav federal unit.

The final session of the ZAVNOBiH was held in Sarajevo in April 1945. There the ZAVNOBiH was transformed into the People's Assembly of Bosnia and Herzegovina and it established the first government of Bosnia and Herzegovina.

== Background ==
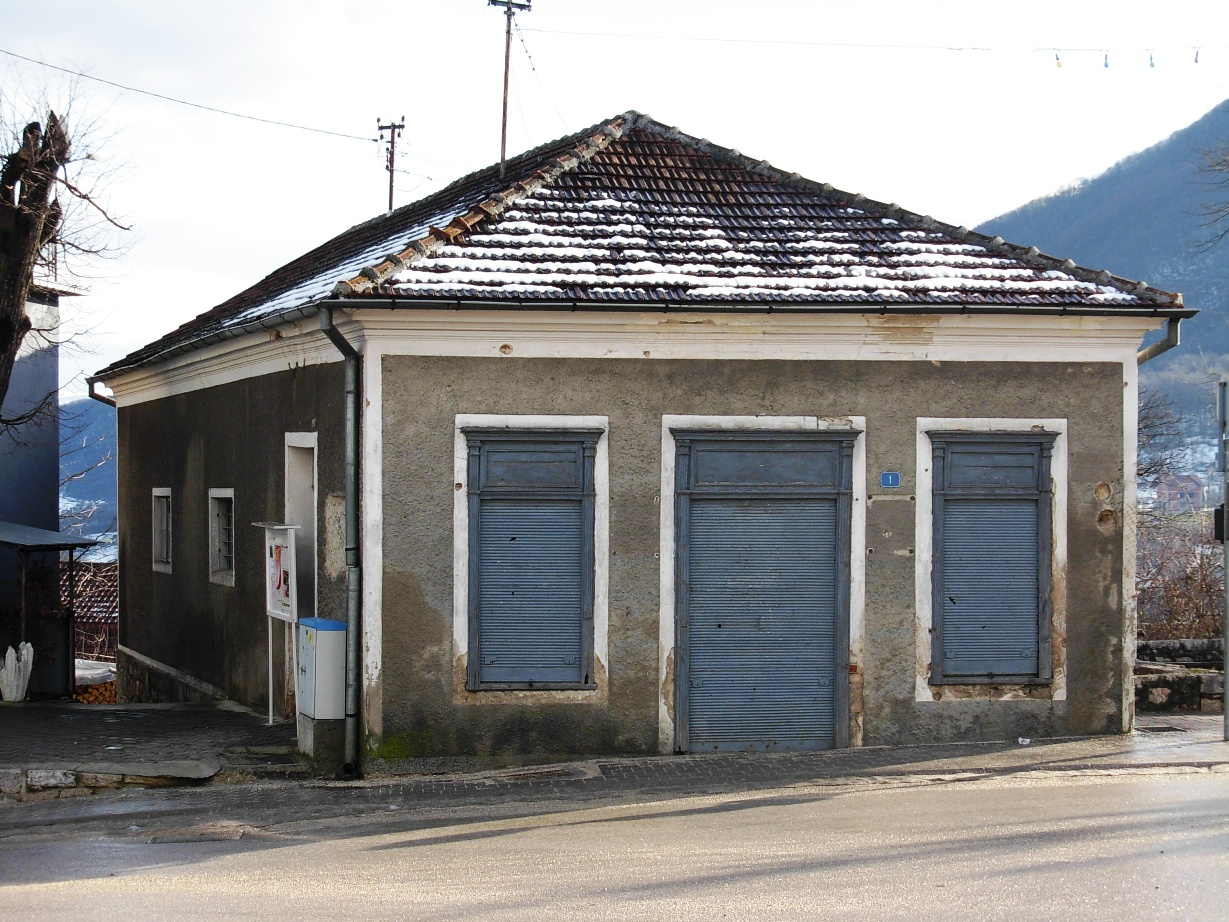
The house in Mrkonjić Grad in which the first ZAVNOBiH session was held

In April 1941, the Axis powers invaded and soon occupied Yugoslavia. With the Yugoslav defeat imminent, the Communist Party of Yugoslavia (Komunistička partija Jugoslavije, KPJ) instructed its 8,000 members to stockpile weapons in anticipation of armed resistance, which would spread, by the end of 1941 to all areas of the country except Macedonia. Building on its experience in clandestine operation across the country, the KPJ proceeded to organise the Yugoslav Partisans, as resistance fighters led by Josip Broz Tito. The KPJ assessed that the German invasion of the Soviet Union had created favourable conditions for an uprising and its politburo founded the Supreme Headquarters of the National Liberation Army of Yugoslavia (Narodonooslobodilačka vojska Jugoslavije) with Tito as commander in chief on 27 June 1941.

By late 1943, Bosnia and Herzegovina was providing a disproportionately large contribution to the Yugoslav Partisan resistance contributing 23 out of 97 Partisan brigades. Only the present-day territory of Croatia contributed more (38). 44% of population of Bosnia and Herzegovina were Orthodox Christians (largely Serbs), 31% were Muslims, and 24% Catholics (generally Croats). The Serb population was most readily motivated to join the Partisan struggle due to severe persecution by the Ustaše regime in the Axis puppet state of the Independent State of Croatia (Nezavisna država Hrvatska, NDH). However, the Partisan leadership was keen on attracting the Muslims as the predominant urban population to improve its chances of gaining control of major towns. While seeking to attract the Bosnian Muslim population to the Partisan movement, the KPJ was competing for loyalty of the predominantly rural Bosnian Serb population with the Chetniks – the Serb-nationalist guerrillas who were backed by Fascist Italy and fighting against the Partisans and the NDH.

== Preparations for the council ==
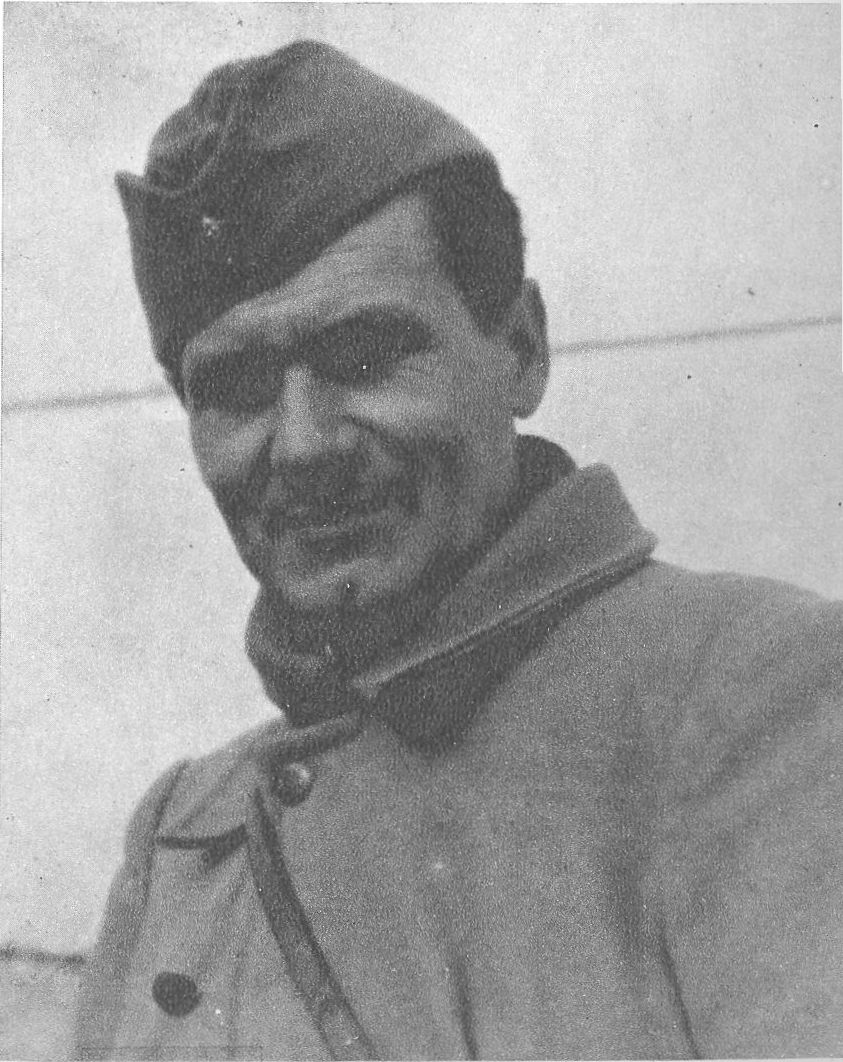
Rodoljub Čolaković led the Bosnian delegation (together with Avdo Humo) in talks with the central committee of the KPJ to determine future status of Bosnia and Herzegovina in Yugoslavia

On 26–27 November 1942, a pan-Yugoslav assembly – the Anti-Fascist Council for the National Liberation of Yugoslavia (Antifašističko vijeće narodnog oslobođenja Jugoslavije, AVNOJ) – was established in Bihać at the initiative of Tito and the KPJ. At its founding meeting, the AVNOJ adopted the principle of multi-ethnic federal state as the solution for future, but stopped short of any formal determination of exact system of government to be implemented after the war. There was also a degree of ambiguity regarding the number or equality of future federal units. Nonetheless, the AVNOJ urged convening of assemblies in future federal units. The first among them was the State Anti-fascist Council for the National Liberation of Croatia (Zemaljsko antifašističko vijeće narodnog oslobođenja Hrvatske, ZAVNOH) established on 13–14 June 1943.

Following the Fifth Enemy Offensive, Tito met with the provincial committee of the KPJ for Bosnia and Herzegovina near Kladanj urging them to convene a body similar to the ZAVNOH. The provincial KPJ leadership likely inferred from the meeting that the status of Bosnia and Herzegovina in future Yugoslav federation would be equal to Serbia or Croatia and used this argument to win over to the Partisan movement influential Muslims by offering the prospect of satisfying their demand for autonomy.

Namely, when the Cvetković–Maček Agreement was reached in 1939 and the Banovina Croatia established, it was widely expected that Serbian and Slovene banovinas would also be set up soon. In response, the leading Muslim political party in the Kingdom of Yugoslavia, the Yugoslav Muslim Organisation (Jugoslavenska muslimanska organizacija, JMO) demanded establishment of an autonomous Bosnian banovina as well. There was a parallel attempt to procure autonomy or the status of a Nazi German protectorate for Bosnia and Herzegovina as the Muslim-led and Banja Luka-based Council of National Salvation saw Ustaše persecution of Serbs and Chetnik reprisals against Muslims as an existential threat. A culmination of the autonomist efforts materialised in the Memorandum of November 1942 sent to Adolf Hitler, seeking autonomy under German protection and blaming the "Serb insurrection" on the illegitimate Ustaše régime and plotting by the Jews. The Memorandum compared the proposed status of Bosnia and Herzegovina to that enjoyed by the Banovina Croatia in Yugoslavia.

Even though the provincial committee of the KPJ unanimously favoured Bosnia and Herzegovina becoming an equal part of Yugoslav federation with other future republics, the future status of Bosnia and Herzegovina was not settled before November 1943. There were competing proposals to establish it as a top-level federal unit or an autonomous province subordinated directly to the federation in some manner, or to Serbia or Croatia. In preparation for the second session of the AVNOJ, a delegation of the provincial committee of the KPJ for Bosnia and Herzegovina met with the central committee of the KPJ and the Partisan Supreme Headquarters in Jajce to discuss the matter.

At the meeting, the provincial committee delegation led by Rodoljub Čolaković and Avdo Humo proposed giving Bosnia and Herzegovina the same status meant for Serbia or Croatia. Humo argued that other arrangements would lead to a clash between Croatia and Serbia over addition of Bosnia and Herzegovina to their territory. Any inclusion of Bosnia and Herzegovina in Croatia or Serbia was universally rejected at the meeting as likely to stoke up Greater Croatian or Greater Serbian chauvinism. However, the central committee was split on the issue of the status of a federated republic or autonomous province. Edvard Kardelj supported Čolaković's and Humo's proposal, but Moša Pijade, Sreten Žujović, and Milovan Đilas were opposed. The dispute was settled by Tito in favour of Bosnia and Herzegovina becoming a republic.

== Convening and work ==
=== First session ===
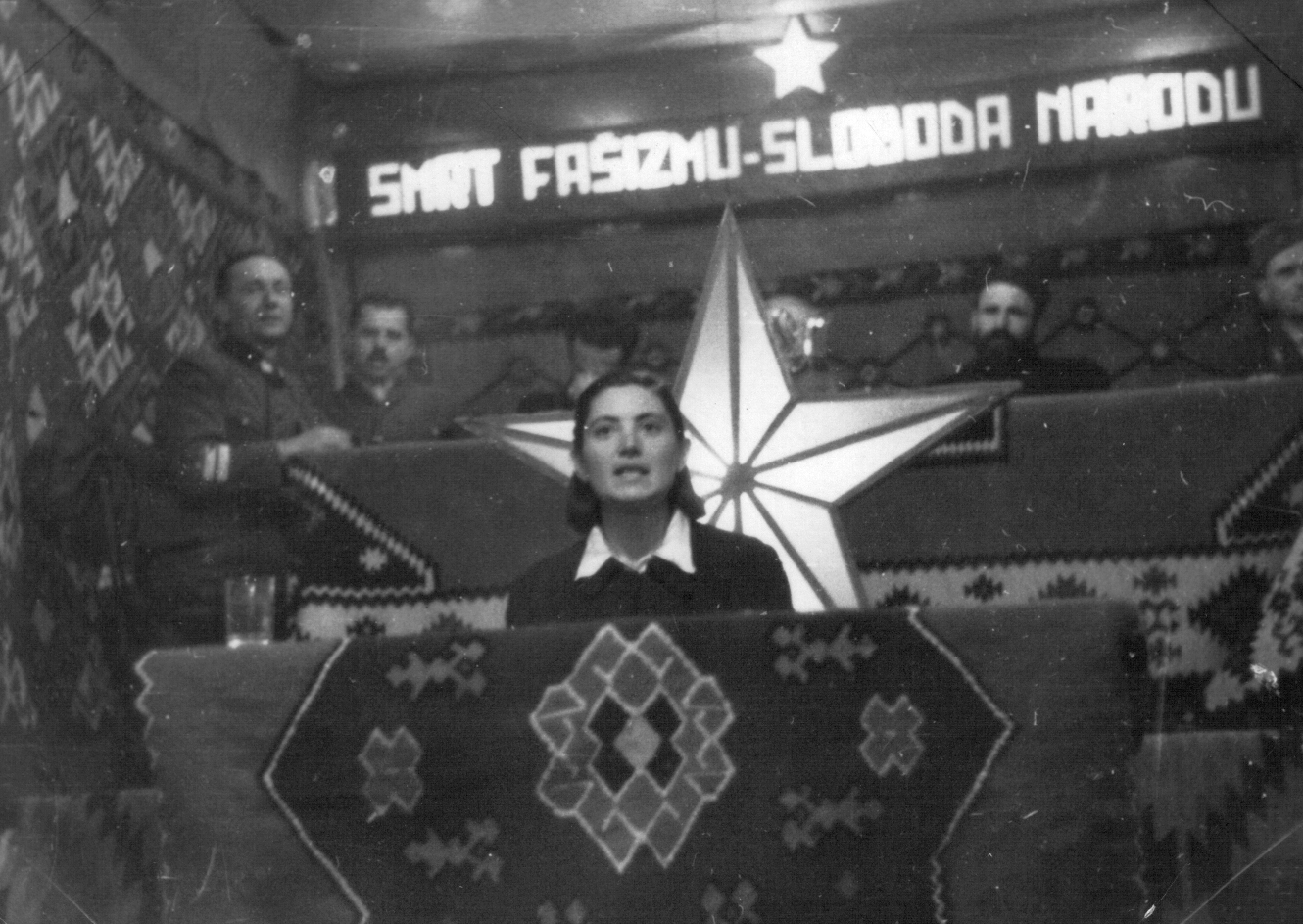
Rada Vranješević, member of the AFŽ and People's Hero of Yugoslavia, speaking at the first ZAVNOBiH session

The ZAVNOBiH was first convened in Mrkonjić Grad. Its first session was attended by 247 provisional delegates, 193 of whom had voting rights. They included Partisan commanders, prominent communists, as well as non-communist delegates. There were representatives of pre-war political parties such as the JMO, the Croatian Peasant Party (Hrvatska seljačka stranka, HSS), the Agrarian Party, the Democratic Party, and the Independent Democratic Party (Samostalna demokratska stranka, SDS). Ultimately, 173 of the assembly’s delegates were ratified. At least 80 delegates were drawn from Bosanska Krajina, 55 from East Bosnia, and 35 from Herzegovina. About 60% of the delegates were Serbs (corresponding to Serb participation in Bosnia and Herzegovina-founded Partisan units) and a quarter were Muslims.

In its first session held on 25–26 November, the ZAVNOBiH was established as the representative legislative body of Bosnia and Herzegovina. It was meant to demonstrate Bosnian patriotism and diversity of segments of society united in opposition to the Axis occupation and was intended to motivate a broader support for the Partisan resistance.

The ZAVNOBiH elected its 31-member presidency, and 53 representatives for the second session of AVNOJ scheduled for 29 November in nearby Jajce. While the body was communist dominated, the presidency members included non-communists in support of the ZAVNOBiH's aim of expanding the Partisan base of support. Thus it included representatives who were members of the HSS and JMO, as well as a member of the Gajret organisation. Its ranks included former Chetnik Vojvoda Pero Đukanović, former Croatian Home Guard Colonel Sulejman Filipović, a Christian Orthodox priest and a Hodja. Vojislav Kecmanović, a pre-war member of the SDS, was elected president of the presidency. Humo, Aleksandar Preka, and Đuro Pucar were elected vice-presidents, and Hasan Brkić was elected secretary. The ZAVNOBiH also adopted a resolution dismissing the order imposed by the Axis powers as well as the pre-war Yugoslav system of government and the Yugoslav government-in-exile, while declaring that the peoples of Bosnia and Herzegovina will contribute to building of federal Yugoslavia on equal terms as other peoples of Yugoslavia.

=== Second session ===
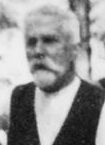
Vojislav Kecmanović presided over the three ZAVNOBiH sessions

The second session of the ZAVNOBiH was convened on 30 June 1944 in Sanski Most. There were 197 delegates at the session. All ratified delegates of the first ZAVNOBiH session were there except five, and a few were added at this session. About one third of the delegates were either absent or represented by a proxy. Pucar and Brkić were keynote speakers. The former talked about the common struggle and brotherhood of people, while the latter explained the need to adopt legal declarations on statehood of Bosnia and Herzegovina, rights of citizens, prosecution of war crimes and other issues related to establishment of a state.

The ZAVNOBiH confirmed the decisions of the second session of AVNOJ. It also adopted a declaration stating that Bosnia and Herzegovina was a sovereign entity enjoying the right to self-determination and that it was voluntarily joining the Yugoslav federation. The ZAVNOBiH authorised the Presidency to use the sovereign powers and issued the Declaration on Rights of the Citizens of Bosnia and Herzegovina recognising equality of Serbs, Muslims and Croats of Bosnia and Herzegovina. By adopting these and other decisions on 30 June – 2 July 1944, the ZAVNOBiH established Bosnia and Herzegovina as a state.

Finally, the ZAVNOBiH elected 26 members of the Presidency. It included communists and non-communists, seeking to represent as wide spectrum of the society as possible. Its president was Kecmanović, while three vice presidents were Humo, Pucar and Jakov Grgurić – a HSS member.

=== Third session ===
The ZAVNOBiH Presidency transferred its seat from Jajce to Sarajevo on 15 April 1945 and decided, the next day, to hold there the third session of the ZAVNOBiH on 26 April. The session would transform the provisional bodies of Bosnia and Herzegovina into regular bodies. Exact list of delegates remains uncertain, but it appears that there were 176 official delegates – 155 of whom attended the proceedings.

The ZAVNOBiH renamed itself the People's Assembly of Bosnia and Herzegovina, and the Presidency was rebranded as the People’s Government. Čolaković was appointed to lead the first government formally voted in on 28 April.

== Public holiday ==
The date of convening of the first session, 25 November, was celebrated as the day of the Socialist Republic of Bosnia and Herzegovina. Since the date was close to the Day of the Republic – the Yugoslav holiday marking the anniversary of the second session of the AVNOJ on 29–30 November – the two anniversaries were referred to in Bosnia and Herzegovina as the November Days. In 1995, the anniversary of convening of the first session of the ZAVNOBiH was formally declared a holiday in the Federation of Bosnia and Herzegovina, where it is marked as Bosnia and Herzegovina Statehood Day.
