= Hamza Humo =

Bosnian writer (1895-1970)

Hamza Humo Хамза Хумо
- Born: 30 December 1895; Mostar, Condominium of Bosnia and Herzegovina, Austria-Hungary
- Died: 19 January 1970 (aged 74); Sarajevo, SR Bosnia and Herzegovina, SFR Yugoslavia
- Occupations: Poet; Dramatist; Novelist
- Writing career
- Notable work: Grozdanin kikot (1927)

Hamza Humo (Cyrillic: Хамза Хумо; 30 December 1895 – 19 January 1970) was a Bosnian journalist, poet, dramatist, and writer. He was a member of the Academy of Sciences and Arts of Bosnia and Herzegovina. His nephew Avdo Humo was a communist politician in Yugoslavia.

== Biography ==
He was born on 30 December 1895 in Mostar. He finished elementary school, gymnasium and maktab in Mostar. At the beginning of the First World War, Humo was drafted into the Austrian army, since Bosnia and Herzegovina had been part of Austria-Hungary for over 30 years at that point. He served as an interpreter and clerk in a hospital, in Győr, Hungary.

After the war, he returned to Mostar, and enrolled at the University of Zagreb's Faculty of Art History. From 1945 he regulated the Bosniak newspaper Nova doba (New Age), and subsequently worked as an editor of Radio Sarajevo and Director of the Art Gallery. Humo's first published work was Nutarnji život (Inner Life) in 1919. He became the editor of Zabavnik in 1923. Humo also served as an editor for the magazine Gajret from 1923 until 1931. From 1927 to 1941. he was a journalist of the Belgrade based newspaper Politika.

== Works ==
- Nutarnji život (1919)
- Strasti (1923)
- Grad rima i ritmova (1924)
- Sa ploča istočnih (1925)
- Grozdanin kikot (1927)
- Pod žrvnjem vremena (1928)
- Od prelaza na Islam do novih vidika (1928)
- Slučaj Raba slikara (1930)
- Pripovijetke (1932)
- Ljubav na periferiji (1936)
- Zgrada na ruševinama (193)
- Za Tita (1946)
- Pjesme (1946)
- Hasan opancar (1947)
- Adem Čabrić (1947)
- Poema o Mostaru (1949)
- Tri svijeta (1951)
- Perišićeva ljubav (1952)
- Izabrane pjesme (1954)
- Hadžijin mač (1955)
- Sabrana djela (1976)
- Jablan do neba (1980)
- Izbor iz djela (1982)
