= Čitluk, Kozarska Dubica =

Čitluk
- Village
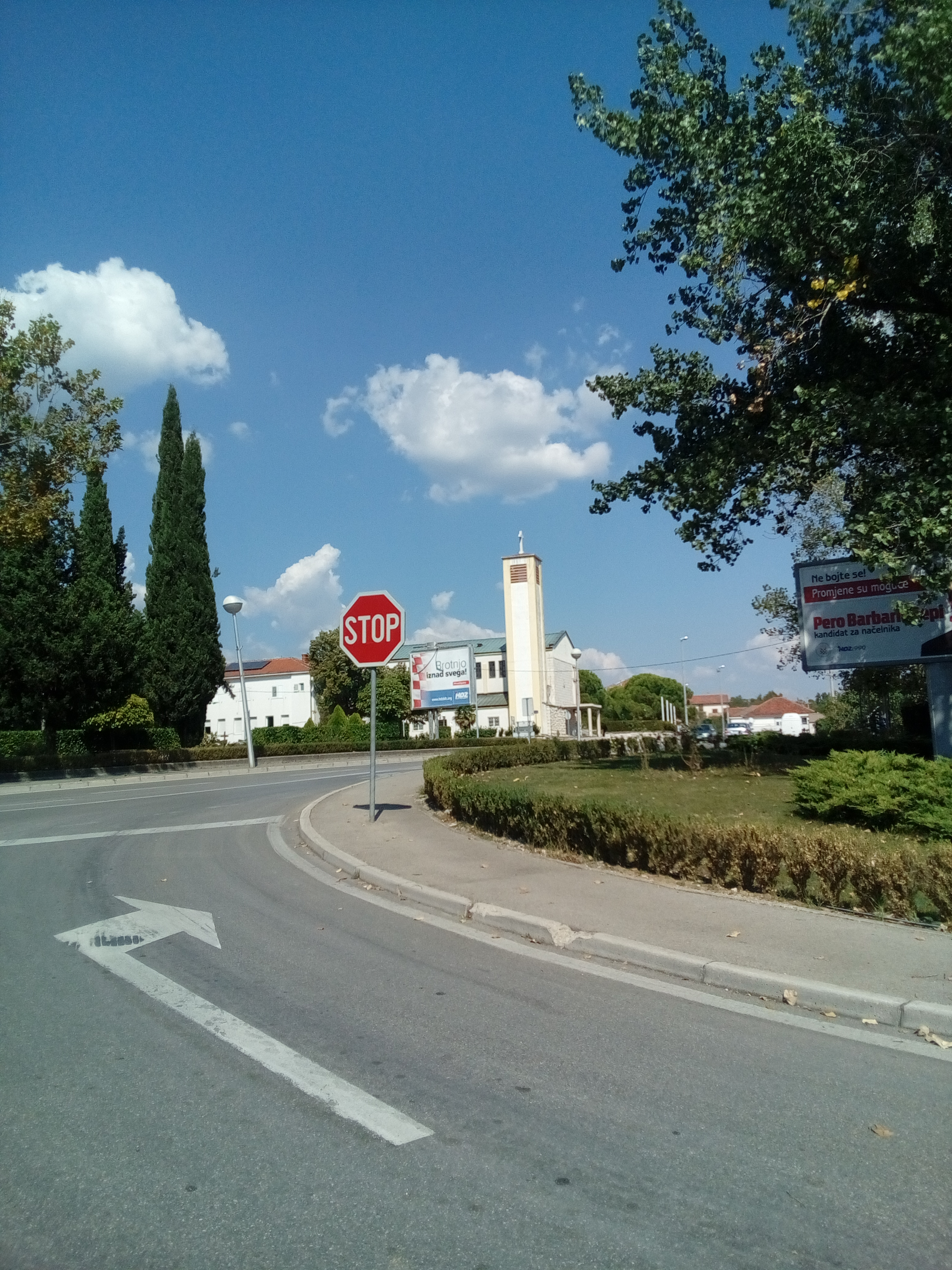
- Čitluk.jpg

- Location within Bosnia and Herzegovina
- Coordinates: 45°9′4″N 16°36′28″E
- Country: Bosnia and Herzegovina
- Entity: Republika Srpska
- Municipality: Kozarska Dubica
- Time zone: UTC+1 (CET)
  - Summer (DST): UTC+2 (CEST)

Čitluk (Serbian Cyrillic: Читлук) is a village in the municipality of Kozarska Dubica, Republika Srpska, Bosnia and Herzegovina.
