= Chairman of the Presidency of Bosnia and Herzegovina =

Head of the Presidency of Bosnia and Herzegovina

- Predsjedavajući Predsjedništva Bosne i Hercegovine (Bosnian); Предсједавајући Предсједништва Босне и Херцеговине (Serbian)

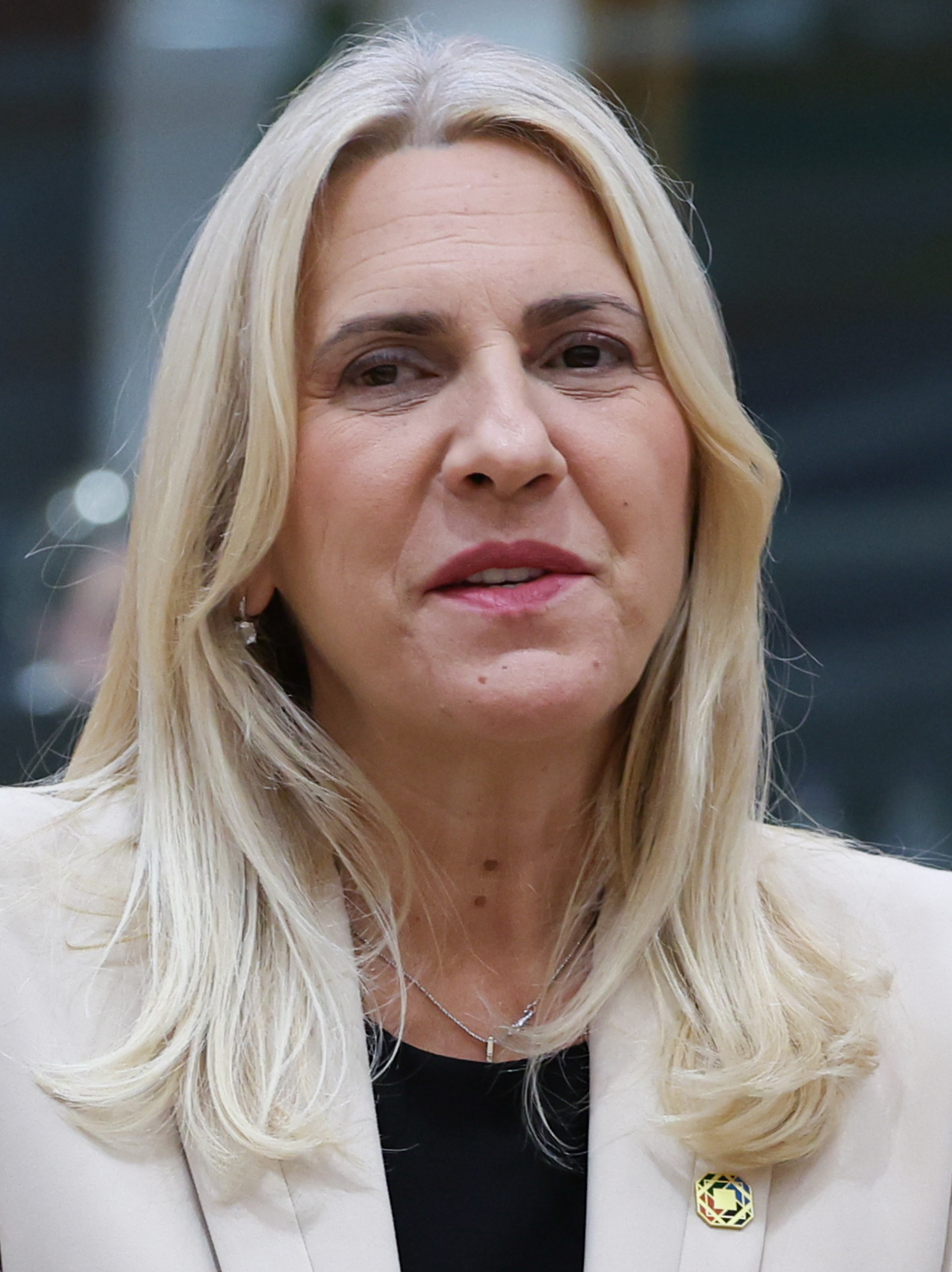
- Incumbent; Željka Cvijanović since 16 November 2026
- Status: Presiding member
- Member of: Presidency
- Seat: Presidency Building, Sarajevo
- Appointer: Popularly elected
- Term length: Eight months, rotated among members of presidency over four-year term
- Formation: 5 October 1996
- First holder: Alija Izetbegović
- Salary: €3,091 monthly
- Website: predsjednistvobih.ba

The chairman of the Presidency of Bosnia and Herzegovina is the presiding member of the Presidency of Bosnia and Herzegovina, which collectively serves as head of state of Bosnia and Herzegovina.

Željka Cvijanović is the incumbent officeholder, having served since 16 November 2026.

== Constitution of Bosnia and Herzegovina ==
According to the Article V of the Constitution of Bosnia and Herzegovina, the presidency comprises three members, representing the constituent nations of Bosnia and Herzegovina: one Bosniak, one Serb, and one Croat. The Bosniak and Croat members are elected from a joint constituency in the Federation of Bosnia and Herzegovina, whilst the Serb member is elected from voters in Republika Srpska.

The three members elected at any one election serve a collective four-year term. Individuals may serve no more than two consecutive four-year terms, although there are no overall term limits.

Although the unsubdivided body is the collective head of state, one member is designated as chairperson. The position of chairperson rotates twice around the three members every eight months, with the candidate receiving the most votes overall becoming the first chairperson over the four-year term.

== List of chairpersons ==
=== Before independence (1945–1992) ===
Communist Party / League of Communists
Party of Democratic Action

Portrait	Name (Birth–Death)	Term of office			Political party
Portrait	Name (Birth–Death)	Took office	Left office	Time in office	Political party
President of the Presidency of the People's Assembly of PR Bosnia and Herzegovina
1	Vojislav Kecmanović (1881–1961)	26 April 1945	November 1946	1 year, 6 months	KP BiH
2	Đuro Pucar (1899–1979)	November 1946	September 1948	1 year, 10 months	KP BiH
3	Vlado Šegrt (1907–1991)	September 1948	March 1953	4 years, 6 months	KP BiH renamed in 1952 to SK BiH
President of the People's Assembly of SR Bosnia and Herzegovina
(2)	Đuro Pucar (1899–1979)	December 1953	June 1963	9 years, 6 months	SK BiH
4	Ratomir Dugonjić (1916–1987)	June 1963	1967	c. 4 years	SK BiH
5	Džemal Bijedić (1917–1977)	1967	July 1971	c. 4 years	SK BiH
6	Hamdija Pozderac (1924–1988)	July 1971	May 1974	2 years, 10 months	SK BiH
President of the Presidency of SR Bosnia and Herzegovina
(4)	Ratomir Dugonjić (1916–1987)	May 1974	April 1978	3 years, 11 months	SK BiH
7	Raif Dizdarević (1926–2026)	April 1978	April 1982	4 years	SK BiH
8	Branko Mikulić (1928–1994)	April 1982	26 April 1983	1 year	SK BiH
9	Milanko Renovica (1928–2013)	26 April 1983	26 April 1985	2 years	SK BiH
10	Munir Mesihović (1928–2016)	26 April 1985	April 1987	1 year, 11 months	SK BiH
11	Mato Andrić (1928–2015)	April 1987	April 1988	1 year	SK BiH
12	Nikola Filipović (1926–2001)	April 1988	April 1989	1 year	SK BiH
13	Obrad Piljak (1933–2013)	April 1989	20 December 1990	1 year, 8 months	SK BiH
14	Alija Izetbegović (1925–2003)	20 December 1990	3 March 1992	1 year, 74 days	SDA

=== Since independence (1992–present) ===
Party of Democratic Action
Socialist Party
Croatian Democratic Union
Social Democratic Party
Party for Bosnia and Herzegovina
Serb Democratic Party
Alliance of Independent Social Democrats
Democratic Front
Party of Democratic Progress

Portrait	Name (Birth–Death)	Ethnicity	Term of office			Political party
Portrait	Name (Birth–Death)	Ethnicity	Took office	Left office	Time in office	Political party
President of the Presidency of the Republic of Bosnia and Herzegovina
1	Alija Izetbegović (1925–2003)	Bosniak	3 March 1992	5 October 1996	4 years, 216 days	SDA
Chairman of the Presidency of Bosnia and Herzegovina
(1)	Alija Izetbegović (1925–2003)	Bosniak	5 October 1996	13 October 1998	2 years, 8 days	SDA
2	Živko Radišić (1937–2021)	Serb	13 October 1998	15 June 1999	245 days	SP
3	Ante Jelavić (born 1963)	Croat	15 June 1999	14 February 2000	244 days	HDZ BiH
(1)	Alija Izetbegović (1925–2003)	Bosniak	14 February 2000	14 October 2000	243 days	SDA
(2)	Živko Radišić (1937–2021)	Serb	14 October 2000	14 June 2001	243 days	SP
4	Jozo Križanović (1944–2009)	Croat	14 June 2001	14 February 2002	245 days	SDP BiH
5	Beriz Belkić (1946–2023)	Bosniak	14 February 2002	28 October 2002	256 days	SBiH
6	Mirko Šarović (born 1956)	Serb	28 October 2002	2 April 2003	156 days	SDS
7	Dragan Čović (born 1956); Acting	Croat	2 April 2003	10 April 2003	8 days	HDZ BiH
8	Borislav Paravac (1943–2026)	Serb	10 April 2003	27 June 2003	78 days	SDS
(7)	Dragan Čović (born 1956)	Croat	27 June 2003	28 February 2004	246 days	HDZ BiH
9	Sulejman Tihić (1951–2014)	Bosniak	28 February 2004	28 October 2004	243 days	SDA
(8)	Borislav Paravac (1943–2026)	Serb	28 October 2004	28 June 2005	243 days	SDS
10	Ivo Miro Jović (born 1950)	Croat	28 June 2005	28 February 2006	245 days	HDZ BiH
(9)	Sulejman Tihić (1951–2014)	Bosniak	28 February 2006	6 November 2006	251 days	SDA
11	Nebojša Radmanović (born 1949)	Serb	6 November 2006	6 July 2007	242 days	SNSD
12	Željko Komšić (born 1964)	Croat	6 July 2007	6 March 2008	244 days	SDP BiH
13	Haris Silajdžić (born 1945)	Bosniak	6 March 2008	6 November 2008	245 days	SBiH
(11)	Nebojša Radmanović (born 1949)	Serb	6 November 2008	6 July 2009	242 days	SNSD
(12)	Željko Komšić (born 1964)	Croat	6 July 2009	6 March 2010	243 days	SDP BiH
(13)	Haris Silajdžić (born 1945)	Bosniak	6 March 2010	10 November 2010	249 days	SBiH
(11)	Nebojša Radmanović (born 1949)	Serb	10 November 2010	10 July 2011	242 days	SNSD
(12)	Željko Komšić (born 1964)	Croat	10 July 2011	10 March 2012	244 days	SDP BiH
14	Bakir Izetbegović (born 1956)	Bosniak	10 March 2012	10 November 2012	245 days	SDA
(11)	Nebojša Radmanović (born 1949)	Serb	10 November 2012	10 July 2013	242 days	SNSD
(12)	Željko Komšić (born 1964)	Croat	10 July 2013	10 March 2014	243 days	DF
(14)	Bakir Izetbegović (born 1956)	Bosniak	10 March 2014	17 November 2014	245 days	SDA
15	Mladen Ivanić (born 1958)	Serb	17 November 2014	17 July 2015	242 days	PDP
(7)	Dragan Čović (born 1956)	Croat	17 July 2015	17 March 2016	244 days	HDZ BiH
(14)	Bakir Izetbegović (born 1956)	Bosniak	17 March 2016	17 November 2016	245 days	SDA
(15)	Mladen Ivanić (born 1958)	Serb	17 November 2016	17 July 2017	242 days	PDP
(7)	Dragan Čović (born 1956)	Croat	17 July 2017	17 March 2018	243 days	HDZ BiH
(14)	Bakir Izetbegović (born 1956)	Bosniak	17 March 2018	20 November 2018	248 days	SDA
16	Milorad Dodik (born 1959)	Serb	20 November 2018	20 July 2019	242 days	SNSD
(12)	Željko Komšić (born 1964)	Croat	20 July 2019	20 March 2020	244 days	DF
17	Šefik Džaferović (born 1957)	Bosniak	20 March 2020	20 November 2020	245 days	SDA
(16)	Milorad Dodik (born 1959)	Serb	20 November 2020	20 July 2021	242 days	SNSD
(12)	Željko Komšić (born 1964)	Croat	20 July 2021	20 March 2022	243 days	DF
(17)	Šefik Džaferović (born 1957)	Bosniak	20 March 2022	16 November 2022	241 days	SDA
18	Željka Cvijanović (born 1967)	Serb	16 November 2022	16 July 2023	242 days	SNSD
(12)	Željko Komšić (born 1964)	Croat	16 July 2023	16 March 2024	244 days	DF
19	Denis Bećirović (born 1975)	Bosniak	16 March 2024	16 November 2024	245 days	SDP BiH
(18)	Željka Cvijanović (born 1967)	Serb	16 November 2024	16 July 2025	242 days	SNSD
(12)	Željko Komšić (born 1964)	Croat	16 July 2025	16 March 2026	243 days	DF
(19)	Denis Bećirović (born 1975)	Bosniak	16 March 2026	16 November 2026	245 days	SDP BiH
(18)	Željka Cvijanović (born 1967)	Serb	16 November 2026	Incumbent	3 days	SNSD

== See also ==
- Presidency of Bosnia and Herzegovina
  - List of members of the Presidency of Bosnia and Herzegovina
  - List of members of the Presidency by time in office
- Chairman of the Council of Ministers of Bosnia and Herzegovina
  - List of heads of government of Bosnia and Herzegovina
