= Vlado Šegrt =

Bosnian politician (1907–1991)

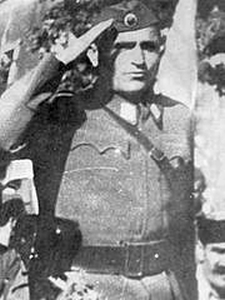
- Šegrt pictured sometime between 1944 and 1945

3rd President of the Presidency of the People's Assembly of the People's Republic of Bosnia and Herzegovina
- In office September 1948 – March 1953
- Preceded by: Đuro Pucar
- Succeeded by: Đuro Pucar (as President of the People's Assembly of the People's Republic of Bosnia and Herzegovina)

Personal details
- Born: 18 December 1907 Aranđelovo, Trebinje, Bosnia and Herzegovina, Austria-Hungary
- Died: 1 August 1991 (aged 83) Aranđelovo, Trebinje, SR Bosnia and Herzegovina, SFR Yugoslavia
- Party: SKJ
- Occupation: Politician, soldier

Vlado Šegrt (18 December 1907 – 1 August 1991) was a Yugoslav participant in the National Liberation Struggle and a socio-political worker in the Socialist Republics of Bosnia and Herzegovina and Yugoslavia. He was a reserve Major General and national hero of Yugoslavia. From September 1948 to March 1953 he was the President of the Presidency of the National Assembly of the People's Republic of Bosnia and Herzegovina.

== Early life and education ==
Šegrt was born into a Serb family on 18 December 1907, in the village of Aranđelovo, near Trebinje. After finishing primary school in the village of Lastva, he worked as a farmer. As a seasonal worker, his interactions brought him into contact with the labor movement.

== Political activism ==
Šegrt became a member of the Union of Communist Youth of Yugoslavia (Communist Youth) in 1928, and the Communist Party of Yugoslavia (CPY) in 1931. The Party included Sava Kovačević, who had a great impact on it. Vlado (Vladimir) was a member of party leadership in Grahovo near Niksic until the formation of the party cell in Lastva. In 1936, Vlado became a member of the Local Committee, and in 1939 the District Committee of the Communist Party of Yugoslavia in Trebinje.

In the April war, Šegrt served in positions in the Bay of Kotor, escaped capture and came home armed. Immediately upon his return, he came into contact with Sava Kovačević and other communists in the Trebinje district. He worked on the organization of the armed struggle and giving resistance to the Ustaše. In his village he formed a partisan company, and was its political commissar. From September 1941, the company won several important victories over the Italians and the Ustaše, which resulted in winning massive public support for the National Liberation Movement (NOB). On 6 January 1942, Šegrt and his company captured an Italian convoy near the village of Klek. They seized a large amount of weapons and ammunition.

Šegrt served as political commissar of the partisan troops, the battalion commander "Luka Vukalović", Commander of the First Herzegovina-Montenegro shock partisan battalion, from 28 January 1942; Commander of the North-Herzegovina Partisan Unit from April 1942; Commander of the Herzegovina Partisan Unit, from mid-June 1942; Commander of the Tenth Herzegovina shock brigades, from 10 August 1942; Deputy Commander of the Third Shock Division and commander of the 29th Herzegovina Partisan division, from mid-November 1943 to the end of the war. The fighting in the western and central Bosnia, Kupres, around Imotski and Posusje, around Mrkonjić Grada, Glamoča, Jajce, Busovače, Turbeta, Žepče, Prozora and Rame, fighters of the Tenth Herzegovina shock brigade won a string of victories. In fighting for Jajce, Rama and the Neretva River, in battles for the liberation of Nevesinje and Gačak, in March–April 1943, soldiers of his brigade destroyed many Italian, Chetnik and Home Guard-Ustasha forces.

As commander of the 29th Division of Herzegovina, Šegrt led many battles in Herzegovina, near Dubrovnik and Herceg Novi, Mostar, Sarajevo, Trieste and Ljubljana. He ended the war with the rank of Major General. He was a councilor of ZAVNOBiH and AVNOJ, and from September 1944 a member of the Regional People's Liberation Assembly and member of the Regional Committee Narodnooslodbodilackog (People's Liberation Movement), front Herzegovina.

After the liberation of Yugoslavia, Šegrt held a number of responsible social and political functions. He was Minister of Agriculture in the first government of the People's Republic of Bosnia and Herzegovina, from 1945 to 1948;

He then was President of the Presidency of the National Assembly of the People's Republic of Bosnia and Herzegovina, from 1948 to 1953 and Vice President of the National Assembly of the People's Republic of Bosnia and Herzegovina and others. He was elected a deputy of the Parliament of Bosnia and Herzegovina and the Federal Assembly, continuously until 1967. He was a member of the Central Committee of the League of Communists of Yugoslavia and member of the Politburo of the Central Committee of BiH, to 1965; member of the Central Committee GAAP BiH and member of the Federal Board of GAAP Yugoslavia until 1963; member of the Central Committee SUBNOR BiH and the Federal Odnora SUBNOR; member of the Central Committee of the Association of Reserve Officers and a member of the Federation Council.

In 1954 in Sarajevo, Šegrt published a book - a chronicle of the People's Liberation Movement War, entitled "Blood on the stone". He died on 1 August 1991, in his home town, Aranđelovo, where he was buried.

== Awards and honors ==
Šegrt was the holder of the Partisan Medal in 1941 and the other Yugoslav awards, including the Order of People's Liberation, the Order of the Yugoslav Flag with Sash, Order of the Partisan Star with Golden Wreath, the Order of Merit with Gold Star, Medal for bravery and others. Order of the People's Hero was awarded on 20 December 1951.
