= Đuro Pucar =

Yugoslav politician

- Ђуро Пуцар
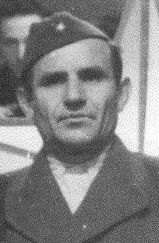

1st President of the People's Assembly of the People's Republic of Bosnia and Herzegovina
- In office December 1953 – June 1963
- Preceded by: Office established
- Succeeded by: Ratomir Dugonjić

2nd President of the Executive Council of the People's Republic of Bosnia and Herzegovina
- In office March 1953 – December 1953
- Preceded by: Office established
- Succeeded by: Avdo Humo

2nd Prime Minister of the People's Republic of Bosnia and Herzegovina
- In office September 1948 – March 1953
- Preceded by: Rodoljub Čolaković
- Succeeded by: Office abolished

2nd President of the Presidency of the People's Assembly of the People's Republic of Bosnia and Herzegovina
- In office November 1946 – September 1948
- Preceded by: Vojislav Kecmanović
- Succeeded by: Vlado Šegrt

1st President of the League of Communists of Bosnia and Herzegovina
- In office 8 July 1943 – 5 March 1965
- Preceded by: Office established
- Succeeded by: Cvijetin Mijatović

Personal details
- Born: Đurađ Pucar; 13 December 1899 Kesići, Bosansko Grahovo, Bosnia and Herzegovina, Austria-Hungary
- Died: 12 April 1979 (aged 79) Belgrade, SR Serbia, SFR Yugoslavia
- Citizenship: Yugoslav
- Party: SKJ
- Profession: Politician, soldier
- Awards: Order of the People's Hero; Order of the Hero of Socialist Labour; Order of the Yugoslav Star
- Nickname: Stari

Military service
- Allegiance: Yugoslav Partisans
- Branch/service: General HQ
- Years of service: 1941–1945
- Rank: Colonel General
- Battles/wars: Battle of Kozara

Đurađ "Đuro" Pucar "Stari" (Serbian Cyrillic: Ђурађ Ђуро Пуцар Стари, pronounced [dʑǔradʑ dʑûro pǔtsar]; 13 December 1899 – 12 April 1979) was a Yugoslav and Bosnian Serb politician.

During World War II he was a member of the Yugoslav Partisans and was later decorated with the Order of the People's Hero and twice with the Order of the Hero of Socialist Labour. After the war he held the position of the President of the Presidency of the People's Assembly of the People's Republic of Bosnia and Herzegovina from 1946–48 and from 1948–53 he served as the Prime Minister (later President of the Executive Council) of Bosnia and Herzegovina.

== Biography ==
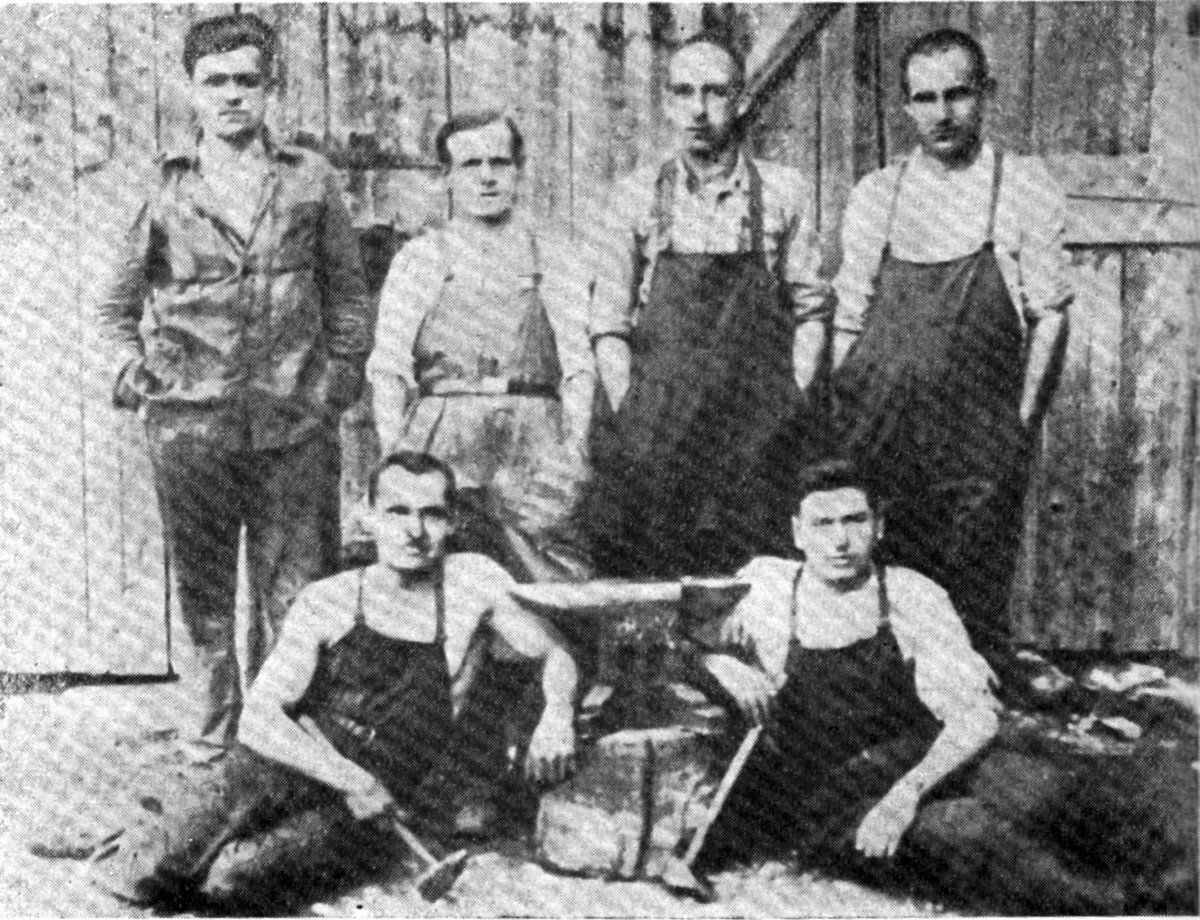
Pucar (first from right) as a political prisoner during the 1920s

Pucar was born on 13 December 1899 in Kesići (part of Bosansko Grahovo). He originated from a poor peasant family. After he finished elementary school he learned farriery in Baranja and Pécs in Hungary. During that time he connected with other workers and became a member of a workers' movement.

In 1920, he joined the Young Communist League of Yugoslavia, and in 1922 he became a member of the Communist Party of Yugoslavia. He was very active in the unions and for a long time he was the union's official. From 1924 to 1929 his activity was based in Subotica Because of the dissemination of leaflets by his "Bečkerečka grupa", he was sentenced to eight years in prison by the Court for Protection of the State. Because he continued his party activity with other prisoners he was sentenced to additional two years, spending ten years in prisons of Lepoglava and Sremska Mitrovica.

After he was released Pucar lived in Sarajevo illegally by order of the Communist Party of Yugoslavia. In Sarajevo he worked in the provincial committee of the Communist Party for Bosnia and Herzegovina. Soon, he was arrested by the police and returned to his hometown, however Pucar returned to Sarajevo and continue his illegal activity.

As a delegate of the Communist Party for Bosnia and Herzegovina, Pucar participated in the Fifth National Conference of the Communist Party of Yugoslavia in Zagreb in November 1940. At that conference he was elected to be a member of the Central Committee of the Communist Party of Yugoslavia. After he returned to Sarajevo he worked on popularization of the Communist Party until the start of the Invasion of Yugoslavia by Nazi Germany in April 1941.

When World War II in Yugoslavia began, Pucar was one of the main organizers of the Partisans on the territory of Bosnia and Herzegovina. When the Central Committee of the Communist Party decided to start a rebellion against the Axis forces on 4 July 1941, Pucar went to Banja Luka.

In Banja Luka, Pucar prepared a rebellion in Bosanska Krajina, and when action started he joined the Yugoslav Partisans. He was member of Partisans until the end of the war, commanding with Bosanska Krajina Partisans.

As a secretary of Regional Committee of the Communist Party for Bosanska Krajina, Pucar constantly visited the Party's organizations and recruited volunteers. He participated in the Party's consultations in Šehitluci near Banja Luka and Orlovići near Prijedor.

During the war, Pucar was one of the most notable persons in Bosanska Krajina. He organized various political and military consultations. Pucar came into conflict with the Axis forces during the Battle of Kozara and Battle for Grmeč.

He was a member of the Supreme Command of the People's Liberation Movement's detachments of Bosnia and Herzegovina, Vice-President of ZAVNOBiH and of the Presidency of AVNOJ.

After the Communists took power at the end of the war, Pucar served on various high-ranking positions; he was the Minister without portfolio in the first Government of Bosnia and Herzegovina, President of the Presidency of the People's Assembly of the People's Republic of Bosnia and Herzegovina and Vice-President of the Presidency of the National Assembly of the Federal People's Republic of Yugoslavia from 1946 to September 1948.

He was also the President of the Executive Council of the People's Republic of Bosnia and Herzegovina and secretary of the Central Committee of the League of Communists of Bosnia and Herzegovina from September 1948 to December 1953.

In 1953, the Presidency of the People's Assembly was abolished amid nationwide constitutional reforms. Subsequently, he again served as head of state in his capacity as President of the Assembly of the People's Republic of Bosnia and Herzegovina from December 1953 to June 1963.

Pucar was a member of the Executive Committee of the League of Communists of Yugoslavia and secretary of the Executive Committee of the League of Communists of Bosnia and Herzegovina.

Pucar died on 12 April 1979 in Belgrade at the Military Medical Academy and was buried in Novo groblje (New Cemetery) in Sarajevo.

== Gallery ==
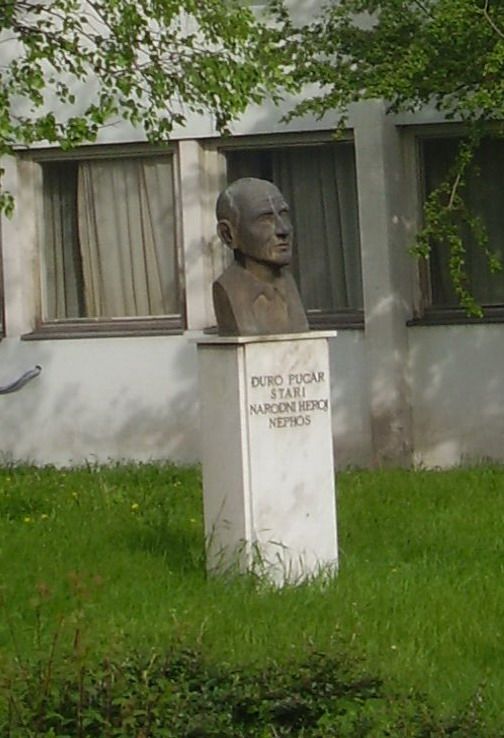
Bust in Subotica

== Notes ==
1. Serbian Cyrillic: Стари, pronounced [stâri]

Political offices
Preceded by Vojislav Kecmanović	President of the Presidency of People's Assembly of the People's Republic of Bosnia and Herzegovina; November 1946 – September 1948	Succeeded by Vlado Šegrt
Preceded by —	Vice-President of the Presidency of the People's Assembly of the Federal People's Republic of Yugoslavia; November 1946 – September 1948	Succeeded by —
Preceded by Rodoljub Čolaković	Prime Minister of the People's Republic of Bosnia and Herzegovina; September 1948 – March 1953	Succeeded by —
Preceded by —	President of the Executive Council of the PR Bosnia and Herzegovina; March 1953 – December 1953	Succeeded by Avdo Humo
Preceded by —	President of the Assembly of the People's Republic of Bosnia and Herzegovina; December 1953 – June 1963	Succeeded by Ratomir Dugonjić
Party political offices
Preceded by —	Secretary of the Regional Committee of the Communist Party for Bosanska Krajina; 1941–1945	Succeeded by —
Preceded by —	Secretary of the League of Communists of Bosnia and Herzegovina; September 1948 – December 1953	Succeeded by —
