= Aranđelovo =

Aranđelovo Аранђелово
- Village
- Interactive map of Aranđelovo
- Location within Bosnia and Herzegovina
- Coordinates: 42°42′N 18°32′E
- Country: Bosnia and Herzegovina
- Entity: Republika Srpska
- Municipality: Trebinje
- Time zone: UTC+1 (CET)
  - Summer (DST): UTC+2 (CEST)

Aranđelovo (Serbian Cyrillic: Аранђелово) is a village in the municipality of Trebinje, Republika Srpska, Bosnia and Herzegovina.

== Notable residents ==
- Vlado Šegrt
