= Munir Mesihović =

Bosnian politician

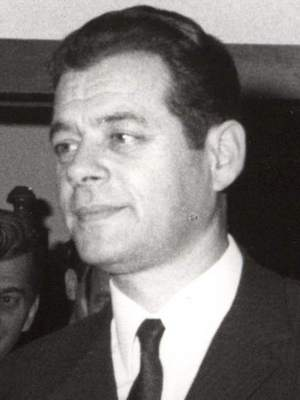
Mesihović in 1971

Munir Mesihović (23 March 1928 – 23 October 2016) was a Bosnian politician who was President of the Presidency of the Socialist Republic of Bosnia and Herzegovina from April 1985 to April 1987. He was publicly criticized for his connections to the Neum Affair.

Political offices
Preceded by Milanko Renovica	Chairman of the Presidency of the Socialist Republic of Bosnia and Herzegovina; 1985–1987	Succeeded by Mato Andrić
