= Avdo Humo =

Bosnian politician

- Авдо Хумо
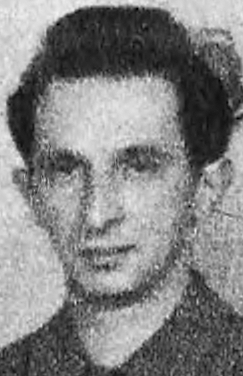
- Humo in 1942

2nd President of the Executive Council of PR Bosnia and Herzegovina
- In office December 1953 – 1956
- Preceded by: Đuro Pucar
- Succeeded by: Osman Karabegović

Personal details
- Born: 1 February 1914 Mostar, Condominium of Bosnia and Herzegovina, Austria-Hungary
- Died: 24 January 1983 (aged 68) Opatija, SR Croatia, SFR Yugoslavia
- Citizenship: Yugoslav
- Party: League of Communists of Yugoslavia
- Spouse: Olga Humo
- Relations: Hamza Humo (uncle); Momčilo Ninčić (father-in-law)
- Profession: Politician, writer
- Awards: Commemorative Medal
- Nickname: Kulturni

Military service
- Allegiance: Yugoslavia
- Branch/service: Yugoslav Partisans
- Years of service: 1941–45

Avdo Humo (Serbian Cyrillic: Авдо Хумо; 1 February 1914 – 24 January 1983) was a Yugoslav and Bosnian communist politician, writer and an Order of the People's Hero recipient.

Humo held highest positions in the Socialist Republic of Bosnia and Herzegovina. In 1972, Humo and Osman Karabegović came into conflict with the leadership of the League of Communists of Bosnia and Herzegovina, accusing it for the establishment of "undemocratic relations" and the introduction of a "strong-arm led regime". This led to Humo and Karabegović being stripped of their posts.

== Biography ==
Humo was born in Mostar on 1 February 1914. He joined the revolutionary movement while he attended high school in gymnasium in Mostar. Because he was expelled from the gymnasium in Mostar, he continued his education in Bihać. Subsequently, he enrolled the University of Belgrade Faculty of Philology, where he obtained a degree in world and Yugoslav literature. At the University, he was one of the organisers and participants in actions of the socialist-oriented students. He became a member of SKOJ in 1934 and a member of the Communist Party of Yugoslavia in 1935. He organised students of Bosnia and Herzegovina into the "Petar Kočić" youth society and the "Neretva" section, where members of the Communist Party were also active.

Humo was among the most prominent party members before World War II in Yugoslavia. In 1940, he became a member of the Regional Committee of the Communist Party for Bosnia and Herzegovina. He was also one of the resistance organisers in Herzegovina against Axis forces. Because he was educated and well read, Humo was nicknamed "Kulturni" by his comrades. His nickname, "kulturni" in Serbo-Croatian can loosely be translated as polite, cultured or well-read. Listening to command he moved to Sarajevo and continued his activity there. As the party's Vice-President, he participated in the First and Second Assembly of ZAVNOBiH. He was also a member of the AVNOJ.

Humo was a founding member of the famous Bosnian newspaper Oslobođenje. He served on various party and state positions, including as the President of the Executive Council of PR Bosnia and Herzegovina (de facto Prime Minister). He was proclaimed People's Hero of Yugoslavia on 27 November 1953. In 1972, he was dismissed along with Osman Karabegović from their posts for alleged Muslim "exclusivism" and "nationalism."

Avdo Humo died on 24 January 1983 in Opatija, Yugoslavia

=== Personal life ===
Humo married Olga Ninčić, daughter of Momčilo Ninčić, a prominent politician of the Kingdom of Yugoslavia and former President of the Assembly of the League of Nations. His wife was a secretary of Yugoslav President Josip Broz Tito during the war. Bosnian writer Hamza Humo was his uncle.

Political offices
Preceded by Đuro Pucar	President of the Executive Council of the People's Republic of Bosnia and Herzegovina; 1953–1956	Succeeded by Osman Karabegović
