= Rodoljub Čolaković =

Yugoslav partisan (1900–1983)

- Родољуб Чолаковић
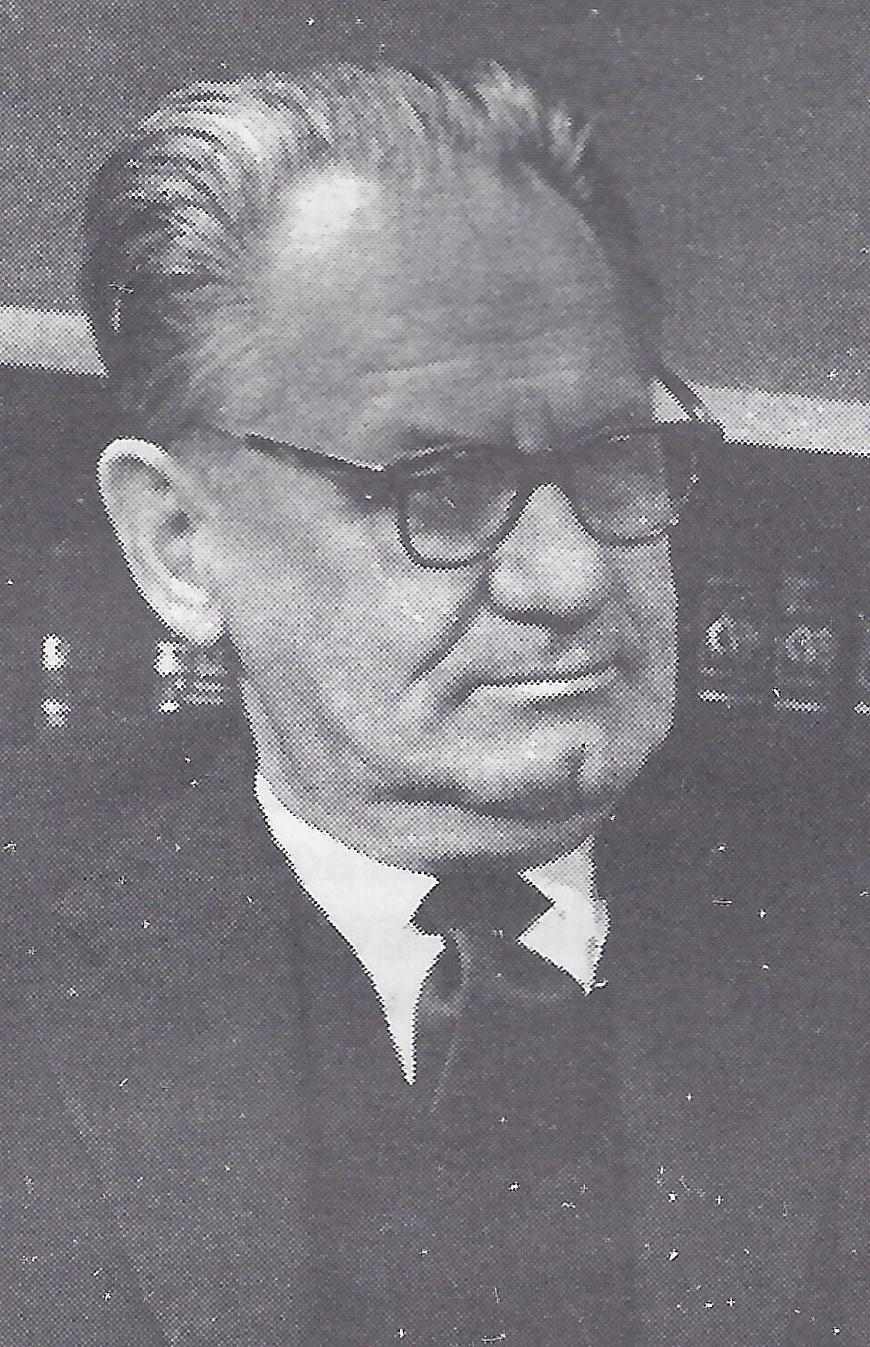
- Čolaković in 1966

1st Prime Minister of PR Bosnia and Herzegovina
- In office 27 April 1945 – September 1948
- Preceded by: Office established
- Succeeded by: Đuro Pucar

Minister for PR Bosnia and Herzegovina in the Provisional Government of DF Yugoslavia
- In office 7 March 1945 – 11 November 1945
- Prime Minister: Josip Broz Tito
- Preceded by: Office established
- Succeeded by: Office abolished

Personal details
- Born: Rodoljub Čolaković; 7 June 1900 Bijeljina, Bosnia and Herzegovina, Austria-Hungary
- Died: 30 March 1983 (aged 82) Belgrade, SR Serbia, Yugoslavia
- Citizenship: Yugoslav
- Party: SKJ (1919–1983)
- Spouse: Milica Zorić-Čolaković
- Occupation: Soldier, politician, journalist
- Awards: 10 Yugoslav and 2 international decorations, including Order of the People's Hero; Order of the Hero of Socialist Labour; Order of National Liberation; Partisan 1941 Commemorative Medal; Order of Polonia Restituta; Order of Kutuzov (full list below)

Military service
- Allegiance: Yugoslavia (1941–1945)
- Branch/service: Yugoslav People's Army; National Liberation Army
- Years of service: 1941–1945
- Rank: Major general
- Battles/wars: Spanish Civil War; World War II

Rodoljub "Roćko" Čolaković (Serbian Cyrillic: Родољуб Чолаковић; 7 June 1900 – 30 March 1983) was a Yugoslav politician, journalist and writer who served as the 1st Prime Minister of PR Bosnia and Herzegovina and as the Minister for PR Bosnia and Herzegovina in the Provisional Government of DF Yugoslavia led by Josip Broz Tito. He was a major general in the Yugoslav People's Army and in the National Liberation Army during World War II.

== Biography ==
Born in Bijeljina, Bosnia and Herzegovina, Austria-Hungary on 7 June 1900, Čolaković joined the League of Communists of Yugoslavia in April 1919 as a student. Later, he joined Red Justice, a left-wing terrorist organisation which assassinated Yugoslav interior minister Milorad Drašković on 21 July 1921. For his role in the assassination, Čolaković was sentenced to 12 years in prison. While serving his sentence, he made friends with many notable Yugoslav communists, including Moša Pijade with whom he translated Das Kapital and other seminal Marxist texts into Serbo-Croatian.

After his release, Čolaković emigrated to the Soviet Union and in 1937 travelled to Spain to take part in the Spanish Civil War on the Republican side. He later came back to Yugoslavia, participating in World War II. In Donja Trnova in 1943, he founded and became first editor-in-chief of the Oslobođenje.

Between 1946 and 1955, Čolaković published five volumes of Zapisa iz oslobodilačkog rata ("Memoir of the liberation war") from his war diaries. In addition to writing newspaper articles, propaganda leaflets and books on World War II, he also published two autobiographies Kuća oplakana ("House of Mourning") and Kazivanje o jednom pokolenju ("Stories of One Generation). Čolaković died on 30 March 1983 at the age of 82 in Belgrade.

== Awards and decorations ==
=== Domestic awards ===
After World War II, Čolaković was awarded many high profile Yugoslav orders, the biggest one of them being the Order of the People's Hero, which he was awarded on 27 November 1953.

1st Row	Order of the People's Hero		
2nd Row	Order of the Hero of Socialist Labour	Order of National Liberation	Order of the Yugoslav Flag
3rd Row	Order of Merits for the People	Order of Brotherhood and Unity	—
4th Row	Order of Bravery	Commemorative Medal of the Partisans of 1941	—
Note: All Yugoslav decorations are now defunct.

=== Foreign awards ===
Čolaković was also awarded two foreign orders; the Polish Order of Polonia Restituta and the Soviet Order of Kutuzov.

Award or decoration	Country	Place	Note
Order of Polonia Restituta	Poland	Warsaw	One of Poland's highest orders.
Order of Kutuzov	Soviet Union	Moscow	Soviet military order.

Political offices
Preceded by Office established	Prime Minister of PR Bosnia and Herzegovina; 1945–1948	Succeeded by Đuro Pucar
