= Hasan Brkić =

Yugoslav and Bosnian communist politician and a partisan

4th President of the Executive Council of PR Bosnia and Herzegovina
- In office 1963 – 14 June 1965
- Preceded by: Osman Karabegović
- Succeeded by: Rudi Kolak

Personal details
- Born: 16 July 1913 Livno, Bosnia and Herzegovina, Austria-Hungary
- Died: 14 June 1965 (aged 51) Sarajevo, Bosnia and Herzegovina, Yugoslavia
- Citizenship: Yugoslav
- Party: League of Communists of Yugoslavia
- Profession: Politician, soldier
- Awards: Order of the People's Hero; Order of the People's Liberation; Order of the Yugoslav Flag; Order of Brotherhood and Unity; Order of Bravery; Partisan Memorial
- Nickname: Aco

Military service
- Allegiance: Yugoslavia
- Branch/service: Yugoslav Partisans; Yugoslav People's Army
- Years of service: 1941–1945; 1965
- Rank: Colonel

Hasan Brkić (16 July 1913 – 14 June 1965), often referred to as Aco, was a Yugoslav and Bosnian communist politician and a partisan. He was also the recipient of People's Hero of Yugoslavia. From 1963 to 1965 he was President of the Executive Council of the Socialist Republic of Bosnia and Herzegovina.

== Early life ==
Brkić was born on 16 July 1913 in Livno where he attended elementary school. He attended gymnasium in Bihać, Banja Luka and Sarajevo. After graduation from high school, Brkić attended Law School at the University of Belgrade where he graduated in 1937.

During his high school days, he was a member of the Communist Party Youth. During his student days in Belgrade he was prominent in leading the circles of the Revolutionary Students' Movement. He became a member of the Communist Party of Yugoslavia in 1933. As a representative of the University of Belgrade, he participated, along with Ivo Lola Ribar and Veljko Vlahović, on the Congress of World Federation of Students in Prague in 1936. Because of his communist activities during the study, Brkić was repeatedly arrested by the police.

== Communist activity ==
After he finished his study, Brkić went to Sarajevo and became an employee of the "Agrarna banka" (English: Agricultural Bank). Soon after he arrived in Sarajevo he made a connection with the Communist Party and again became politically active.

Due to his communist activity, he was fired from the service in the bank, later he found a job as a municipal official, after which he worked as a law clerk.

From 1938 along with attorneys of the Central Committee of the Communist party, he worked on the development and consultations of the organisations of the Communist Party in Bosnia and Herzegovina.

Brkić also participated in the Fourth Regional Conference of the Communist Party of Yugoslavia for Bosnia and Herzegovina held in Mostar in 1938. In 1940, he became a secretary of the Sarajevo District Committee for the Communist Party of Yugoslavia.

=== World War II ===
When the invasion of Yugoslavia started in April 1941, Brkić was mobilized to the Royal Yugoslav Army. When Kingdom of Yugoslavia capitulated, he was in service in Sinj.

After that, he returned to his hometown where he worked in the local organisation of the Communist Party of Yugoslavia. Soon he went to Sarajevo and started organising the rebellion in Bosnia and Herzegovina. He participated in session of the Regional Committee of the Communist Party for Bosnia and Herzegovina held on 13 July 1941, where Communist Party made decisions about the rebellion against the Axis forces. On this session, he became a commander of the Headquarters of Partisan detachments of Sarajevo District and he also participated in the creation of the earliest partisan detachments: Romanija detachment, Kalink detachment, and Detachment "Zvijezda" (English: Star).

During the war, he held various posts, he was the political commissar of Partisan Detachment "Zvijezda", deputy of political commissar of the 6th Proletarian East Bosnian Shock Brigade and a political commissar of the 27th East Bosnian Brigade.

He was a councilor of the AVNOJ from November 1943 to 1945 and secretary of the ZAVNOBiH. During the war he was chosen as a member of the Regional Committee of the Communist Party of Yugoslavia for Bosnia and Herzegovina and secretary of the Districts Committee for Eastern Bosnia.

Even though he was a high-ranking party member during the war, he was often in contact with the enemy. In the battle against the Ustaše in Han Pogled near Han Pijesak he distinguished himself by capturing an Ustaše's stronghold. He was also successful in battle against Chetniks on Vareš railway where he, alongside Pero Kosorić, completely annihilated them.

== Communist Yugoslavia ==
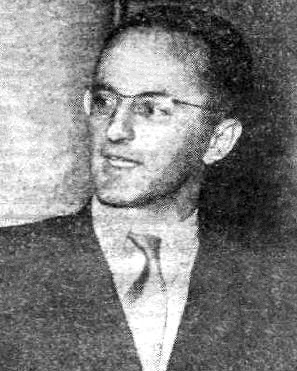
Brkić in 1956

After the war was over, Brkić was in various posts in SFR Yugoslavia. He was a minister of finance in the First Government of the People's Republic of Bosnia and Herzegovina, state secretary of the National Agriculture and state deputy secretary in foreign affairs in the Government of the Federative People's Republic of Yugoslavia. From 1958 to 1961, he was a secretary of the industry of the Federal Executive Council, from 1961 to 1963 he was a vice president of the Executive Council of the People's Republic of Bosnia and Herzegovina, and from 1963 until his death he was a president of the Executive Council of the Socialist Republic of Bosnia and Herzegovina (de facto a prime minister).

Along with the state posts, Brkić also held a number of posts within the Party. He was a member of the Politburo of the Central Committee of the Communist Party of Bosnia and Herzegovina and a member of the Central Committee of the League of Communists of Yugoslavia. From 1952 he was a member of the Executive Council of the League of Communists of Bosnia and Herzegovina, and from 1965 had a rank of a colonel in Yugoslav People's Army.

== Legacy ==
Brkić dealt with economic policy and his works about it were published in journals "Naša stvarnost" (English: Our Reality) and "Pogled" (English: The View) and others. In 1957, he published a book "U matici života" (English: In Mainstream of Life).

Brkić was decorated with Partisan Memorial (1941) and Order of People's Hero of Yugoslavia (27 November 1953).

Brkić died on 14 June 1965 in Sarajevo and is buried at the Bare cemetery.

A street in Sarajevo bears his name.
