= Olga Humo =

Yugoslav partisan, writer, and academic

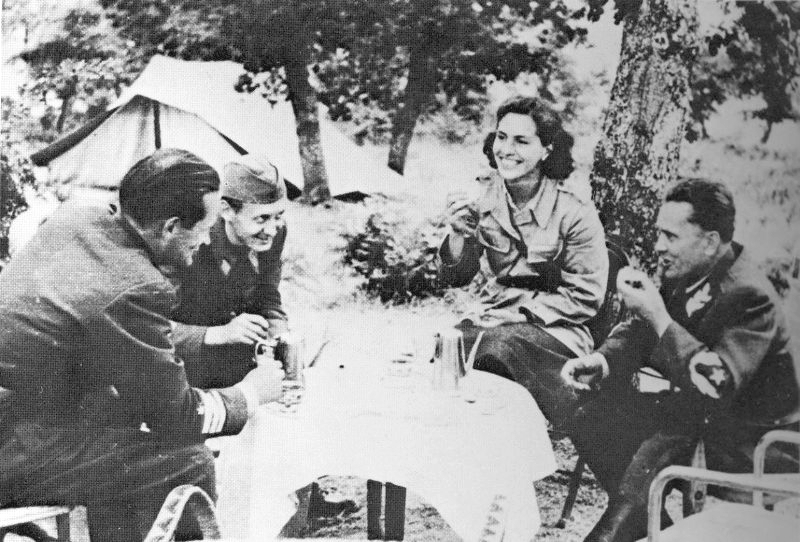
From right to left: Josip Broz Tito, Olga Humo (née Ninčić), Jefto Šašić and Ivan Rukavina on Vis, 7 August 1944.

Olga Humo (née Ninčić; Belgrade, 17 May 1919 – Belgrade, 4 August 2013) was a Yugoslav partisan, writer and university professor. She was attached to the Partisan Supreme Headquarters as one of the most prominent women fighters and served as personal secretary to communist leader Josip Broz Tito throughout the Second World War.

== Biography ==
Humo was born in Belgrade in 1919, to a wealthy family. Her father, Momčilo Ninčić, was a university professor, economist and politician. He had been a member of parliament, government minister, and served as President of the Assembly of the League of Nations from 1926 until 1927. This international exposure and London education ensured Olga spoke in "quiet and perfect English, with no trace of accent".

She enrolled into Belgrade University, joined the Communist Youth organisation and married fellow student and Mostar-born Bosnian communist activist Avdo Humo in 1940. She did not follow her parents in exile to London but remained in Yugoslavia. Her father was a senior minister in the Yugoslav Royal government in-exile in London, opposing the communists.

In 1941, she was arrested by Ustaša police, and, although pregnant, managed to escape the guards at Sarajevo hospital. After the birth of her child, she had to leave the infant with her husband's parents in Mostar and join partisans at Tito's GHQ where her fluency in the English language was very much needed.

She worked with Dr Ian Mackenzie of the RAMC, William Deakin, Fitzroy Maclean, and other Anglo-American representatives throughout their stay in the Balkans.

In August 1944, together with Vladimir Velebit and Maclean, she flew to Naples and assisted Tito during numerous meetings with Winston Churchill at Caserta. At their last gathering, she received a gold locket, with the inscription "To Olga from Winston S. Churchill."

== Sources ==
- Churchill, Winston S. (1985). The Second World War, Volume VI - Triumph and Tragedy. Massachusetts: Houghton Mifflin Company. ISBN 0-395-41060-6.
- Deakin, F. W. D. (2011). The Embattled Mountain. London: Faber and Faber Ltd. ISBN 978-0-571-27644-8.
- Maclean, Fitzroy (1991). Eastern Approaches. London: Penguin Books. ISBN 978-0-141-04284-8.
- Maclean, Fitzroy (1957). The Heretic, The Life and Times of Josip Broz-Tito. New York: Harper & Brothers. LCCN 57-6130.
