= Rudi Kolak =

Yugoslav and Bosnian communist politician

Rudolf Kolak
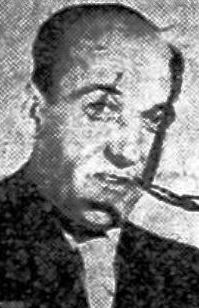

President of the Chamber of Commerce of Yugoslavia
- In office 1969–1974

5th President of the Executive Council of PR Bosnia and Herzegovina
- In office 14 June 1965 – 1967
- Preceded by: Hasan Brkić
- Succeeded by: Branko Mikulić

Personal details
- Born: 4 November 1918 Gornji Ribnik, State of Slovenes, Croats and Serbs
- Died: 22 December 2004 (aged 86) Belgrade, Serbia and Montenegro
- Party: League of Communists of Yugoslavia
- Profession: Civil servant, soldier

Military service
- Allegiance: Yugoslavia
- Branch/service: Yugoslav Partisans
- Years of service: 1941–1945

Rudolf Kolak (4 November 1918 – 22 December 2004) was a Yugoslav and Bosnian communist politician.

== Biography ==
Kolak was born in Gornji Ribnik near Ključ to a Bosnian Croat family. He studied at the University of Belgrade's Law School until 1940. Kolak joined the Communist Party of Yugoslavia in 1941, joining the Partisans. Later he became a member of the Central Committee of the Communist Party of Yugoslavia.

After the war, Kolak held various posts: he was Secretary of the People's Assembly of Socialist Republic of Bosnia and Herzegovina, President of People's Assembly in Banja Luka, President of the Supervisory Committee, and Minister in the Government of the Socialist Republic of Bosnia and Herzegovina.

After that he was spokesman in the Ministry of Finance of the Government of SFR Yugoslavia and spokesman of the President of Yugoslavia, Josip Broz Tito.

From 1963-65 he was Vice President of the Executive Council of SR Bosnia and Herzegovina and became President of the Executive Council of SR Bosnia and Herzegovina in 1965 and held that post until 1967.

After that he was Vice President of the Federal Government of SFR Yugoslavia from 1967–69 and President of the Yugoslav Chamber of Commerce from 1969-74.
