= Milanko Renovica =

Bosnian and former Yugoslav politician

- Mилaнкo Peнoвицa

President of the Presidency of the Central Committee of the League of Communists of Yugoslavia
- In office 28 June 1986 – 30 June 1987
- Preceded by: Vidoje Žarković
- Succeeded by: Boško Krunić

4th President of the Presidency of the Socialist Republic of Bosnia and Herzegovina
- In office 26 April 1983 – 26 April 1985
- Prime Minister: Gojko Ubiparip
- Preceded by: Branko Mikulić
- Succeeded by: Munir Mesihović

8th President of the Executive Council of the Socialist Republic of Bosnia and Herzegovina
- In office April 1974 – 28 April 1982
- Preceded by: Dragutin Kosovac
- Succeeded by: Seid Maglajlija

Personal details
- Born: 19 October 1928 Sokolac, Kingdom of Serbs, Croats and Slovenes
- Died: 2 November 2013 (aged 85) Prague, Czech Republic
- Party: SKJ
- Occupation: Politician

Milanko Renovica (Serbian Cyrillic: Mилaнкo Peнoвицa; 19 October 1928 – 2 November 2013) was a Bosnian and former Yugoslav politician. He was the President of the League of Communists of Yugoslavia. He also served as President of the Presidency of Bosnia and Herzegovina and as the President of the Executive Council of Bosnia and Herzegovina.

Renovica lived in Bosnia and Herzegovina. He died on 2 November 2013 in Prague, Czech Republic, aged 85.
