= Duckling (disambiguation) =

A duckling is a baby duck, typically covered in soft down feathers.

Duckling or ducklings may also refer to:

- Duckling (software), a collaborative software suite
- "Duckling" (Louie), a 2011 episode of the TV series Louie
- Loening Duckling, the name of several models of aircraft developed by Loening Aeronautical Engineering in the 1910s and 1920s
- Lincoln Ducklings, a minor-league American baseball team in the Western League that existed only in 1906

== See also ==
- The Ugly Duckling (disambiguation)
- Make Way for Ducklings, a 1941 children's book by Robert McCloskey
