= Copenhagen (EWTC show) =

- Company: East West Theatre Company
- Genre: A play
- Date of premiere: April 25, 2008
- Location: Memorial to the Victims of WW II, Vrace Sarajevo

Creative team
- Director: Nermin Hamzagic
- Writer: Michael Frayn
- Set designer: NewWay Studio; Amir Vuk Zec
- Poster Design: Bojan Hadzihalilovic; Goran Lizdek
- Costume design: Kao Pao Shu
- Lighting design: Muamer Causevic
- Translation: Sonja Basic
- Video Art: Fabrika
- Actors: Amar Selimovic; Damir Markovina; Sabina Bambur

Other information
- Production: East West Theatre Company
- Producer: Haris Pasovic
- Executive Producer: Ismar Hadziabdic
- Financial Manager: Sanela Brcic
- Production Assistant: Iris Dizdarevic
- Official website

Copenhagen is the name of East West Theatre Company's theatre production of the same name; written by Michael Frayn and directed by Nermin Hamzagic. This show is Nermin Hamzagic's first professional directorial engagement and it was soon followed by a documentary called Dreamers which was selected for screening at Sarajevo Film Festival 09 and Jihlava documentary film festival.

Copenhagen tells a story of two nuclear physicists and a wife of one of them. Werner Heisenberg was one of the founders of quantum mechanics and he also discovered the Uncertainty Principle. Niels Bohr, Heisenberg’s professor, was one of the scientists whose findings played a crucial role in understanding of structure of atom and quantum mechanics.

Copenhagen, directed by Nermin Hamzagic, was played at a derelict and abandoned Memorial to the Victims of WW II, Vraca Memorial Park in Sarajevo near the so-called inter-entity boundary drawn during the 1991-1995 war in Bosnia and Herzegovina. It was also performed during East West Theatre Company's summer festival called Summer Begins With East West in June 2009.
