= Dreamers (2009 film) =

- Directed by: Nermin Hamzagić
- Screenplay by: Nermin Hamzagić
- Produced by: Haris Pašović; East West Theatre Company
- Starring: Samir Karić; Amir Muminović
- Release date: 22 September 2009
- Running time: 30 minutes
- Country: Bosnia and Herzegovina
- Language: Bosnian

Dreamers is a Bosnian short documentary film produced by the East West Theatre Company and directed by Nermin Hamzagic.

The film follows the story of Samir Karić and Amir Muminović, young hip-hop artists from the village of Hajvazi, near the north-eastern Bosnian town of Kalesija. The mayor's son gave the hip-hop duo a bad beating because of their song which criticized municipal authorities. A newspaper report on the incident intrigues East West Theatre Company, a theatre and film production company from Sarajevo. Shortly after the incident, Samir and Amir become part of the cast of Class Enemy (play) a play about disenfranchised youth in a violent secondary school in Bosnia and Herzegovina. Samir and Amir eventually end up touring the world with the East West Theatre Company's production.

The film Dreamers is devised as a road movie.
