= Edward Clug =

Romanian Choreographer

- Born: 1973 (age 51–52); Beiuș, SR Romania
- Occupation: Choreographer

Edward Clug is a choreographer in the field of contemporary ballet born in Romania.

== Early life and education ==
Clug was born in Romania and studied classical ballet in Cluj-Napoca.

== Career ==
In 1991 Clug joined Maribor's Slovene National Theater (SNT) as a Principal Dancer while also performing with Zagreb Ballet as a guest artist.

In 1996, the Slovene National Theater commissioned Clug to choreograph his first ballet called Babylon by Tomas Pandur. Clug's first full evening ballet, called Tango, premiered at SNT in 1998.

Continuing his relationship with the Slovene National Theater, in 2003 he was appointed director of Maribor ballet, leading the company towards new and distinctive directions. Throughout the past decade, Clug drew attention of the international audience to himself, due to his specific choreographic style. He equally succeeded in putting the Maribor Ballet ensemble on the international dancing map. The Ballet of the SNG Maribor participated in the largest theatre festivals throughout the world performing his choreographies. His Radio & Juliet, choreographed in 2005 in Maribor, became an international hit and toured internationally: Jacob's Pillow Dance Festival (USA), The Stars of the with nights festival in Mariinski theatre St.Petersburg, Festival of Firsts in Pittsburgh, Arts Festival in Singapore, Biarritz Festival in France, Dance Festival in Tel Aviv, Sintra Festival in Portugal, Festival Des Arts de Saint-Sauveur (Canada), and at the Seoul International Dance Festival (Korea), at the Milan Teatro Piccolo and toured Netherlands, Belgium, Italy, and the countries of ex-Yugoslavia.

In 2006, he created Architecture of Silence, in partnership with the Slovene National Theaters in Maribor and Ljubljana, with two choirs and two orchestras. The performance opened Singapore Arts Festival (2008).

Clug collaborated with Slovenian composer Borut Kržišnik with whom he created four dance performances. Sacre du Temps was conceived and produced from January to October 2007, and premiered in Heerlen, Netherlands, on October 7 the same year. The performance toured for two months across the country, concluding on December 15 in Maastricht. The collaboration with Kržišnik continued with Skitzen, with opening at Oper Graz in 2010, and Devine Comedy, which was presented at BITEF in 2011. In 2014, his choreography Songs for Mating Season, featuring the eponymous composition by Borut Kržišnik, was presented at the Music Biennale Zagreb.

In 2008 he starts to collaborate with Slovenian composer Milko Lazar with whom he creates Pret-a-porter at the SNG Maribor (2008), 4 Reasons for the National Ballet of Portugal (2009) and Pocket Concerto for Stuttgart Ballet (2009). After the success of Pocket Concerto he continues to collaborate with Stuttgart Ballet for whom he creates "Ssss..." (2012) and together with Lazar "No Men´s Land" (2014). Both pieces received great response from critics and the audience.

After Stuttgart Ballet, Edward Clug continues to work with other major companies. For the Zurich Ballet he created the acclaimed Hill Harper´s Dream (2013) and Royal Ballet of Flanders commissioned him to stage Stravinsky´s "Les Noces" (2013). Another choreography for the Maribor Ballet is Stravinsky’s Rite of Spring. Maggie Foyer describes his work in Dance Europe magazine: "Edward Clug, director of the Maribor Ballet, has achieved the near impossible: a new and meaningful interpretation of Stravinsky's Le Sacre du Printemps".

His choreography for the Maribor Balet to Carmina Burana by Carl Orff premiered in 2021.

His works are being performed around the world and were commissioned by many ballet theatres: West Australian Ballet, Romanian National Ballet in Bucharest, Station Zuid in the Netherlands, Bitef Dance Company in Belgrade, Aalto Ballet in Essen, Ukrainian National Ballet in Kyiv, Ballet Graz, Croatian National Ballet in Zagreb and Rijeka and Ballet Augsburg. New works are being on the way for Zurich Ballet and NDT2 in 2015.

Edward Clug also collaborated with theatre directors. Beside Tomaž Pandur with whom he started his choreographic career, he also worked with Haris Pašović the founder of East West Theatre Company. Together they created two pieces: Europe Today and Roses for Anne Teresa/Football Stories In Europe Today he was both choreographer and performer, while in Roses for Anne Teresa/Football Stories he was choreographer and coauthor.

== Awards ==
Clug is the recipient of numerous national and international awards. He has received the Slovene Award of the Prešern Foundation (2005) as well as the Glazer Charter (2008). He is recipient of the Best Contemporary Choreography prize at the 18th International Ballet Competition in Varna; a Bronze Medal at the International Ballet and Choreographic Competition in Moscow, a Bronze Medal at the 4th International Ballet Competition in the Contemporary category in Nagoya (2002); a Special Prize for Best Choreography at the International Ballet Competition in Nagoya (2002); and third prize and the public award at the 17th Hanover Choreographic Competition in Germany (2003). The show he choreographed, Roses for Anne Teresa/Football Stories, also won a Special Award for Best Choreography at the International Theatre Festival MESS Sarajevo 2011.

He received in Belgrade Dimitrije Parlić Award for the production of Divine Comedy for Bitef Dance Company in collaboration with Grad Teatar Budva (2011).

He was nominated for the Russian awards Golden Mask for the piece Quatro, that was created for the Mariinsky Ballet stars: Denis Matviienko, Leonid Sarafanov, Olesja Novikova and Anastasya Matviienko.
