= Roses for Anne Teresa/Football Stories =

- Company: East West Theatre Company; Bosnian National Theatre Zenica
- Genre: A play with music and dance
- Date of premiere: 23 September 2011
- Location: Bosnian National Theatre Zenica, Bosnia and Herzegovina

Creative team
- Director: Haris Pašović
- Authors: Haris Pašović; Edward Clug
- Set designer: Vedad Orahovac
- Poster Design: Enes Huseincehajić
- Costume design: Oshyosh
- Lighting design: Haris Pašović; Edward Clug
- Choreographer: Edward Clug
- Sound design: Enrico Fidone; Philip Tan
- Video Art: Bojan Hadžihalilović; Antonio Ilic
- Music Director: Philip Tan
- Photography: Johnny Alexandre Abbate
- Wardrobe: Edina Bahtanović

Other information
- Producers: Ismar Hadžiabdić; Hazim Begagić; Haris Pašović
- Financial Coordinator: Sanela Brcic
- Production Assistant: Lejla Abazović
- Stage Manager: Bruno Lovrić
- Director Assistant: Bruno Lovrić
- Official website

Roses for Anne Teresa / Football Stories is a joint theatre production of East West Theatre Company from Sarajevo and Bosnian National Theatre Zenica. The show is dedicated to Anne Teresa De Keersmaeker, a choreographer and her masterpiece Rosas danst Rosas. The show, directed by Haris Pašović and choreographed by Edward Clug, premiered 23 September 2011 in Zenica's Bosnian National Theatre. After that it toured eleven Bosnia and Herzegovina towns. Those towns have included Prijedor, Bihać, Jajce, Gradiska, Sarajevo, Sokolac, Rudo, Tešanj and Srebrenik.

The show deals with a theme of masculinity in a small Balkan town and examines the question of identity of a 21st-century man. It won a “Special Award for Best Choreography” at the International Theatre Festival MESS Sarajevo 2011.

== Original cast ==
Actor	Role
Aida Corbadžić	Bar Singer
Philip Tan	Musician
Thomas Steyaert	Gas Station Worker
Ulisse Romano	Truck Driver
Ibrahim Ouattara	Miner
Aydar Valeev	Waiter
Ayberk Esen	Criminal
