= Sarajevo Red Line =

2012 memorial event in Sarajevo, Bosnia and Herzegovina

- Sarajevo Red Line Poster
- Genre: Memorial Event
- Location: Marshal Tito street, Sarajevo, Bosnia and Herzegovina

Creative team
- Director and Author: Haris Pasovic
- Set Design: Lada Maglajlic
- Costume Design: Oshyosh – Irma Saje; Vanja Cira
- Music Director: Merima Ključo
- Artistic Director of "Art Vivo": Danijel Zontar
- Performers: Ensemble “Art Vivo” Jasna Diklić
- Soloists: Ivica Šarić; Aida Corbadžić
- Accordion: Merima Ključo
- Music: All arrangements and compositions by Merima Ključo and Danijel Žontar
- School Choirs: Sarajevo Elementary and High school students
- Art Director (Design): Bojan Hadžihalilović
- Poster Design: Vedad Orahovac
- Video Design: Antonio Ilić
- Photography: Midhat Mujkić
- Brochure Design: Enes Huseinčehajić

Other information
- Accountant: Sanela Brcic
- PR Manager and Production Assistant: Bruno Lovric
- Program Manager: Lejla Abazovic
- Executive Producer: Ismar Hadziabdic
- Producer: Haris Pasovic
- Official website

Sarajevo Red Line (Bosnian: Sarajevska Crvena Linija) is the name of the memorial event organized in cooperation between the City of Sarajevo and East West Theatre Company which commemorated the Siege of Sarajevo's 20th anniversary. It was held April 6, 2012, in the main Sarajevo street and it consisted of a large chair installation, street exhibition of war posters and a concert. Authors describe Sarajevo Red Line as a drama and music poem dedicated to the Sarajevo citizens killed during the 1992-96 siege of their city.

== Program ==
The central event of Sarajevo Red Line was staged near the Eternal Flame monument.

From the stage near the flame down the Maršal Tito Street, 11,541 empty red chairs were arranged in 825 rows (as an audience). This red “audience” stretched for 800 meters and ended in the area between the building of the Presidency of BiH and Ali-pasha’s Mosque. 11,541 empty chairs symbolized 11,541 victims of the war which, according to Research and Documentation Center were killed during the Siege of Sarajevo. 643 of the chairs were small, representing the slain children. On some of them, during the day-long event, passers-by left teddy bears, little plastic cars, other toys or candy.

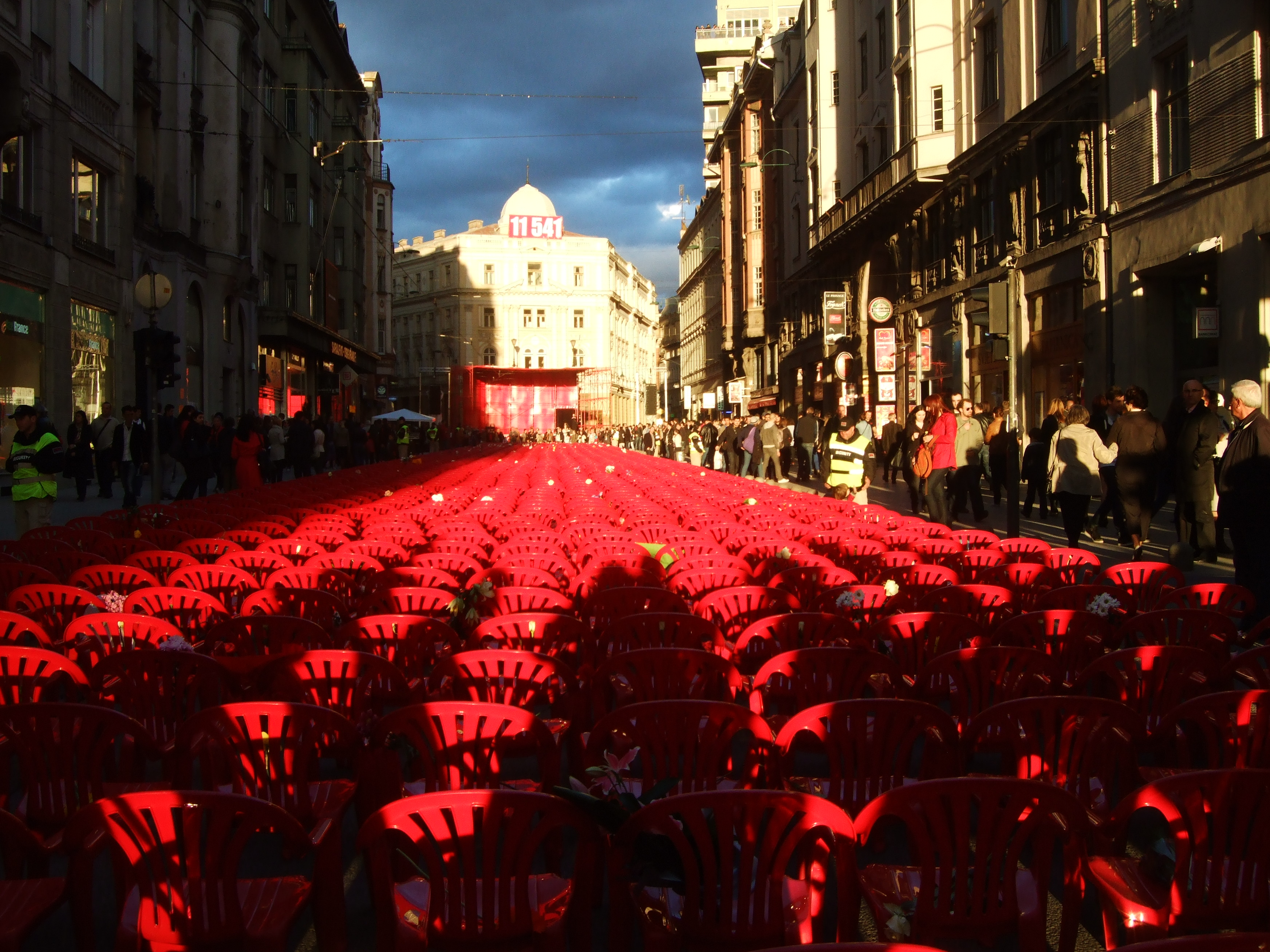
Sarajevo Red Line chairs

The program consisted of poetry and music. It was performed by Merima Ključo, internationally renowned accordion player, along with the Sarajevo classical music choir, Art Vivo led by Danijel Žontar, composer and choir’s artistic director, soloists; Ivica Šarić, Aida Čorbadžić, Ivan Šarić, Amir Saračević, Dragan Pavlović, Leo Šarić and Deniza Đipa. The program also included a large school choir consisting of 750 students from Sarajevo elementary and high schools. At the end of the ceremony, they lined up among the red chairs and sang John Lennon's legendary song: "Give Peace a Chance.". The plan for the Sarajevo Red Line, was first publicly presented on March 27 at the Sarajevo City Hall by a team of artists and officials.

The International Criminal Tribunal for former Yugoslavia (ICTY) sentenced two former Bosnian-Serb generals for overseeing the siege of Sarajevo. Stanislav Galić and Dragomir Milošević were both found guilty of terrorizing civilians in Sarajevo and sentenced to life imprisonment and 29 years' imprisonment respectively. The siege of Sarajevo lasted 44 months and is considered today the longest in modern history. Most of the people killed in the city were hit by snipers and bombs fired from the surrounding Serb-held mountains.

The April 6, 2012 commemoration was the first time that Sarajevo has put on an official program of this scale in memory of the victims of the siege.

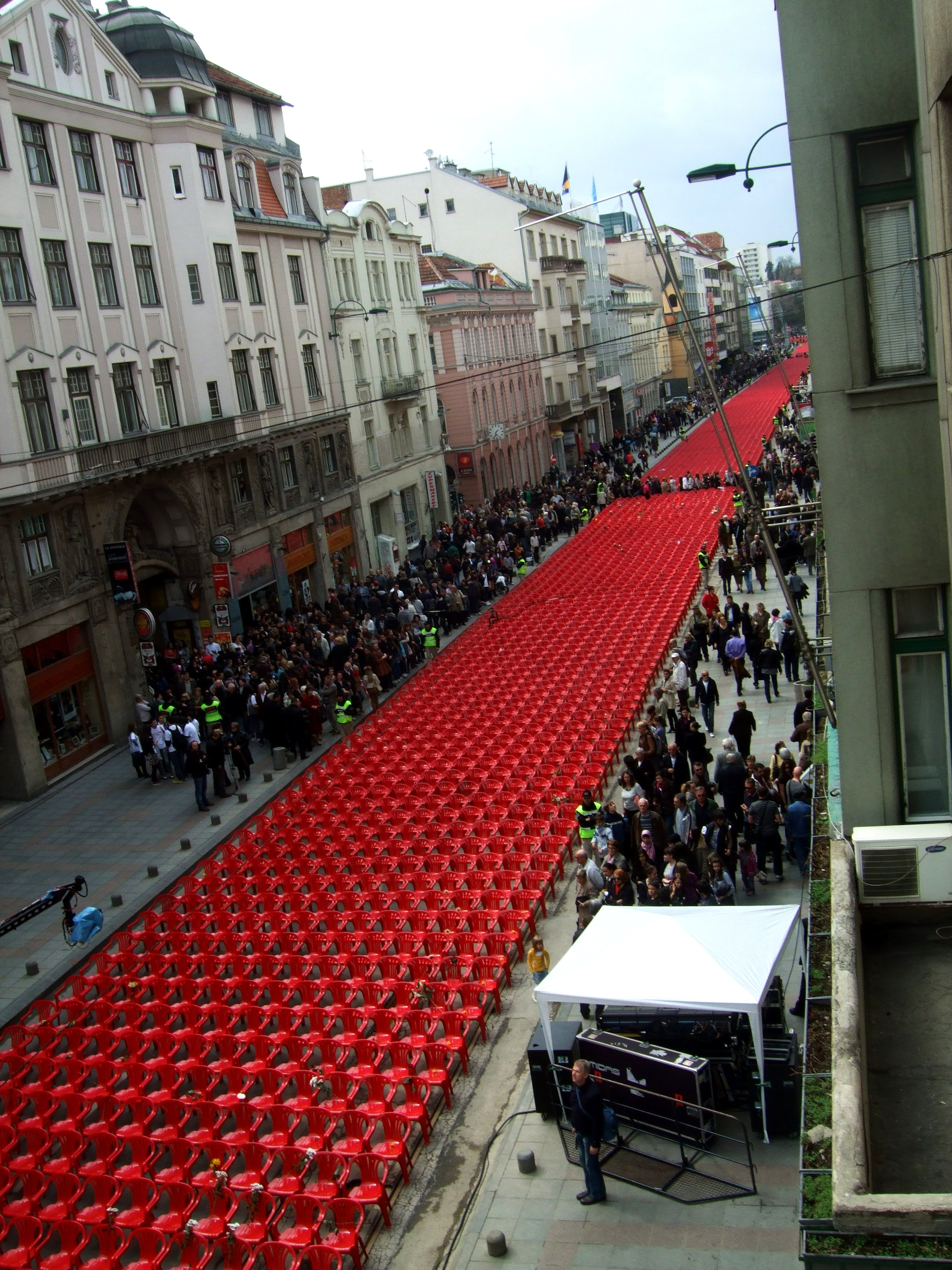
Aerial view of Sarajevo Red Line

In 2014, an exhibition of photographs from the Sarajevo Red Line opened in Istanbul, Turkey.

== History ==
During the Siege of Sarajevo, 380,000 people were left without food, electricity, water or heating during 46 months, hiding from the 330 shells a day that smashed into the city. On April 6, 1992, around 40,000 people from all over the country – Muslim Bosniaks, Christian Orthodox Serbs and Catholic Croats – poured into a square further down the red street demanding peace from their quarrelling nationalist politicians.

The European Community had recognized the former Yugoslav republic of Bosnia as an independent state after most of its people voted for independence. However, the vote went down along ethnic lines, with Bosniaks and Croats voting for independence, and Bosnian Serbs preferring to stay with Serb-dominated Yugoslavia.

The ethnic unity being displayed on the Sarajevo square irritated Serb nationalists, who then shot into the crowd from a nearby hotel, killing 5 people and marking the start of the 1992-1995 war. The Serb nationalists, helped by neighbouring Serbia, laid siege to Sarajevo and within a few months occupied 70% of Bosnia, expelling all non-Serbs from territory they controlled.

Bosniaks and Croats – who started off as allies – subsequently turned against each other, so that all three groups ended up fighting a war that made half of the population homeless and left the once-ethnically mixed country devastated and divided into mono-ethnic enclaves.

It is estimated that during the war in Bosnia and Herzegovina, more than 100,000 people were killed. Thousands of people were raped and hundreds of thousands of people were forced out of their homes or fled before a peace accord was signed in 1995. During nearly four years of siege, an average of 329 grenades fell on Sarajevo each day. The daily record of 3,777 grenades was tallied on July 22, 1993.

== Gallery ==
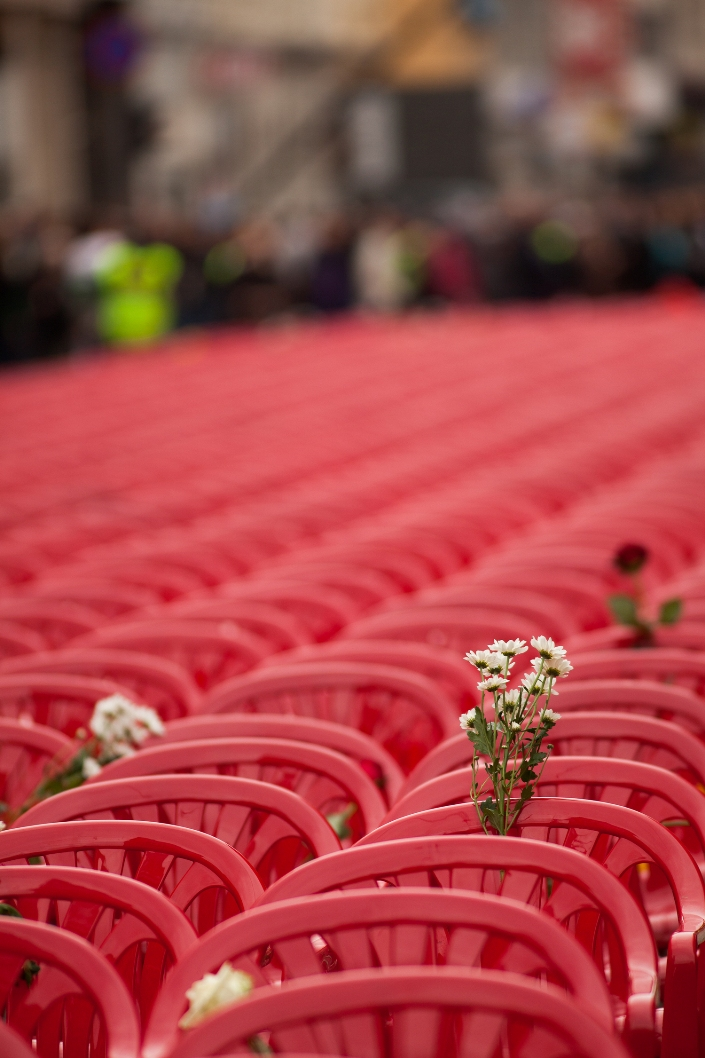

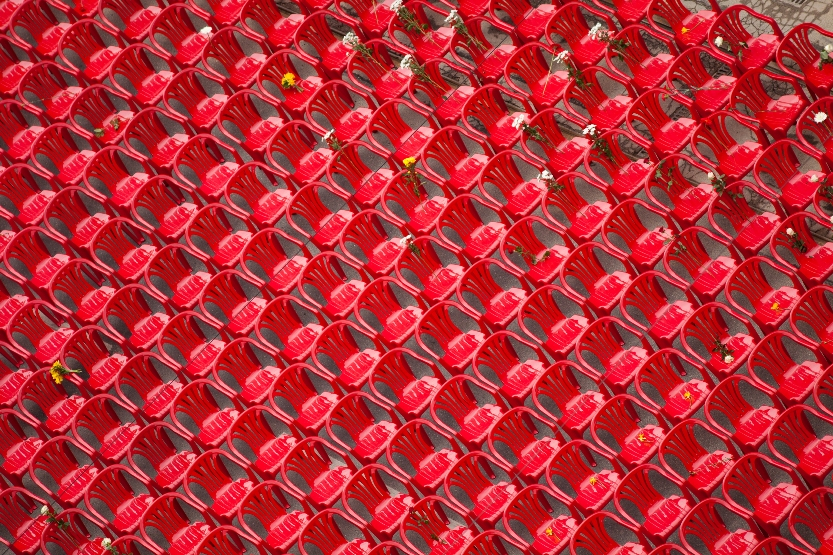

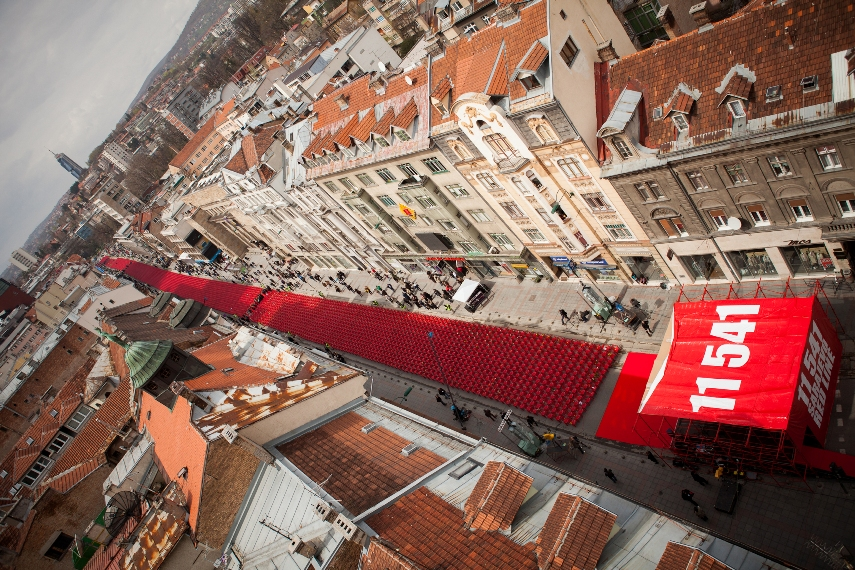

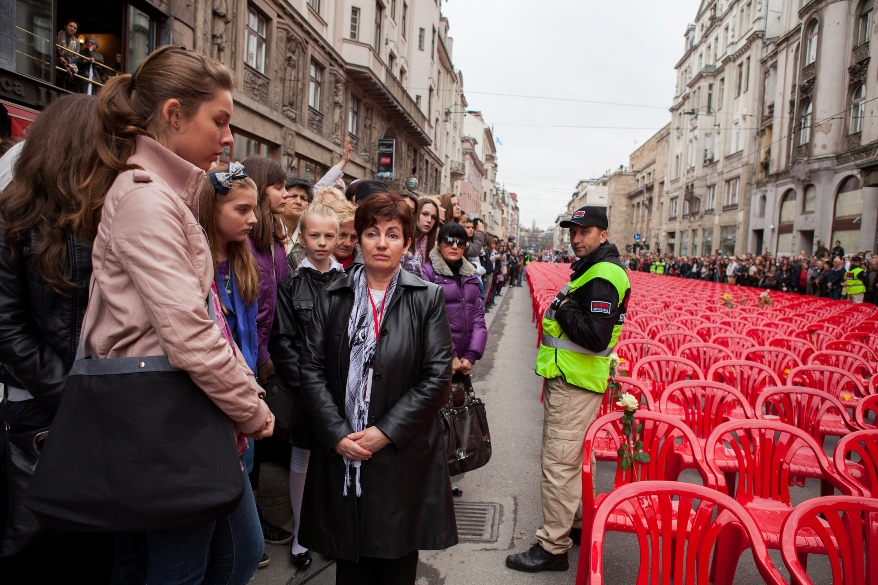

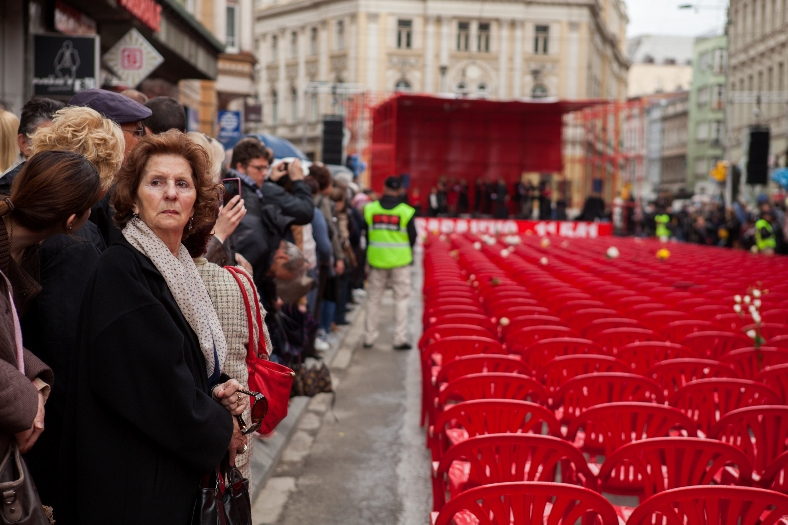

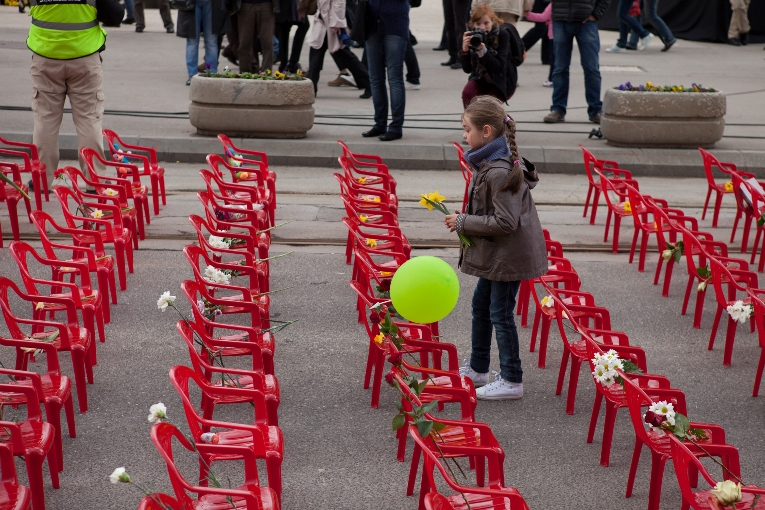
