= Football, Football =

- Company: East West Theatre Company
- Genre: Musical theatre
- Date of premiere: May 20, 2010
- Location: Victoria Theatre and Concert Hall, Singapore Arts Festival

Creative team
- Director: Haris Pasovic
- Set designer: Justin Hill
- Poster Design: Bojan Hadzihalilovic
- Costume design: LAICHAN
- Lighting design: Haris Pasovic; Barbara Mugnai
- Choreography: Scarlet Yu; Haris Pasovic; Cast
- Video: Roberto Russo; Enzo Pascolo; Paolo Barone
- Composer: Philip Tan
- Director assistant: Yvone Yuen
- Photography: Salvatore Esposito; Ciro Fusco
- Original cast: Stefano Ferraro; Ibrahim Ouattara; Philip Tan; Terry Lee; Scarlet Yu; Terence Ong; Alessandro Schiattarella; Francesco Pacelli; Andrea Capaldi; Adi Hrustemovic; Azri Majilan; Miha Askerc

Other information
- Production: Napoli Teatro Festival Italia / in co-production with East West Theatre Company, Singapore Arts Festival / in collaboration with Flota Institute, Ballets C. de la B. / patronage by Fondazione Cannavaro Ferrara
- EWTC Administrator: Sanela Brcic
- Organization: Lejla Abazovic; Dino Rossi; Cinzia Mela
- Executive Producers: Ismar Hadziabdic; Mascia Pavon
- Technical Director: Marciano Rizzo
- Official website

Football, Football is a theatre show produced by the East West Theatre Company in cooperation with Napoli Teatro Festival Italia, Singapore Arts Festival, Flota Institute from Slovenia, Ballets C. de la B, and patronage by Fondazione Cannavaro Ferrara Napoli Teatro Festival. Football, Football was directed, conceived and written by Haris Pašović. Since the opening in May 2010, it has been performed for fifteen times on three continents ( Asia, Europe, and Africa). The artists from four continents (Europe, Asia, Africa, Australia) and seven countries (Italy, Singapore, China, Slovenia, Burkina Faso, Bosnia and Herzegovina, and Australia) participated in this project.

Football Football, explores the phenomenon of football and its impact on ordinary people, includes a combination of dance and football, which director Haris Pasovic has called "football dance."

The show is set in a guns-and-drugs-ridden ghetto of Scampia in Naples, the fiefdom of Camorra (Italy’s second largest mafia group), where a group of young people play soccer every night. The setting is similar to the slums where some of the football’s greatest players, such as Diego Maradona and Zinedine Zidane, grew up. Young people living here dream about better life and football career. Some of them are from the immigrant families, some are unemployed Italians, but all of them the scugnizzi - a term for Neapolitan street children. The lives of these emarginati, (the marginalized ones) are suspended between the gloomy reality and their dreams about soccer. They are too old to start a football career and too young to give up their hopes. One day, a Stranger shows up among them. Suddenly they find themselves in the boots of some of the greatest players.

Live music, dance, football, story-telling drama and video interplay are some of the major elements of this production's narrative.
