= Faust (EWTC show) =

Show directed by Haris Pasovic

- Poster for East West Theatre Company's production of play Faust.
- Company: East West Theatre Company
- Genre: A play
- Date of premiere: August 12, 2006
- Location: BKC (Bosnian Culture Centre), Tuzla Bosnia and Herzegovina

Creative team
- Director: Haris Pasovic
- Concept: Haris Pasovic
- Set designer: Lada Maglajlic; Amir Vuk Zec; Omar Selo
- Graphic Design: Bojan Hadzihalilovic; Goran Lizdek
- Costume design: Kao Pao Shu (Oshyosh)
- Light design: Haris Pasovic; Semir Ramić
- Script fragments: Christopher Marlowe; Emil Cioran; Bill Joy; Bertrand Russell; Werner Heisenberg; Haris Pasovic
- Translation: Senada Kreso; Irena Zlof; Haris Pasovic
- Choreographer: Denes Debrei
- Actors: Damir Markovina; Amar Selimovic; Miroslav Fabri; Lidija Stevanovic; Irma Alimanovic; Akira Hasegawa; Jasenko Pasic; Maja Izetbegovic; Aldin Omerovic
- Musicians: Dino Šukalo; Amar Češljar

Other information
- Production: East West Theatre Company
- Cooproducers: Bosnian Cultural Centre, Tuzla; MESS Festival
- Executive Producer: Ismar Hadziabdic
- Financial Manager: Sanela Brcic
- Project Coordinator: Sanita Ljajic
- Official website

Faust is the name of the show produced by the East West Theatre Company and directed by Haris Pasovic. The action is set in the foreseeable future and the script is based on texts by Emil Cioran, Bertrand Russell, Christopher Marlowe, Bill Joy, Werener Heisenberg and Haris Pasovic.

An international cast of actors and musicians have participated in the production which synthesizes drama, contemporary dance, acrobatics and music. Themes of the show include intelligence, politics and greed for knowledge, power and money. East West Theatre Company's Faust poses some of the fundamental questions about intellectual capacities, human measure and ethics.

The plot includes faustian bargain and the democratisation of evil Robots, who in this production, are more conscious than humans. Dr. Faust, the character who agrees to give his soul to the devil in exchange for superhuman powers while he is alive, creates bio-robots which develop the ability to decide for themselves and procreate. The robots, who resemble Ridley Scott's humanoid clones from his classic film "Blade Runner", show more emotion than Faust and abandon him altogether.
