= Europe Today =

Europe Today may refer to:

- Europe Today (play), a 2011 Slovene play with music
- Europe Today (radio programme), a 1991–2011 radio programme broadcast on BBC World Service
