= Class Enemy =

Class Enemy may refer to:

- Class enemy, in the Soviet Union, a designation similar to "enemy of the people"
- Class Enemy (play), a 1978 play by Nigel Williams
- Class Enemy (film), a 2013 Slovenian film
