= Vanishing Point (theatre company) =

Vanishing Point theatre company was founded in Glasgow in 1999 by Matthew Lenton.

Vanishing Point's work has been performed throughout the UK and internationally, at international festivals and venues including Edinburgh International Festival, Buenos Aires International Festival, Santiago A Mil, BOZAR Arts (Brussels), Théâtre de la Ville (Paris), Stanislavsky Foundation Festival (Moscow), National Theatre of Portugal (Porto) & Brighton Festival.

The company receives funding from Creative Scotland, the National Lottery and Glasgow City Council.

In 2004, it launched Space 11, an initiative aiming to encourage collaboration between young arts organisations in Scotland, by providing them with office space and workshops in order to enhance business skills and create more time for making work.

== History ==
Formed in 1999 in Glasgow, Scotland by graduates of the University of Glasgow, its first production was an adaptation of Les Aveugles (The Blind) by Maurice Maeterlinck, performed in total darkness. The piece was performed at BAC in London in a season entitled "Playing in the Dark". The company's first major show was in 2004, entitled Lost Ones, a surreal show concerning a man, a murder on a mountain, the little creatures who are smuggling things out of him years later and a void on the other side of the skirting board. Lost Ones went on to tour internationally.

Recent work includes The Destroyed Room (2016), The Beautiful Cosmos of Ivor Cutler (2014), a co-production with the National Theatre of Scotland in association with Eden Court, Wonderland (2012), a co-production with Napoli Teatro Festival Italia, Tramway (Glasgow) and Eden Court (Inverness); Saturday Night (2011), a co-production with Teatro Naçional São João, São Luiz Teatro Municipal, Centro Cultural Vila Flor and Tramway; The Beggar’s Opera (2009), a co-production with Royal Lyceum Theatre and Belgrade Theatre in association with Tramway; Interiors (2009), a co‐production with Napoli Teatro Festival Italia, Teatro Stabile di Napoli, Traverse Theatre in association with Lyric Hammersmith and Tron Theatre, developed with the support of the National Theatre Studio (London); Little Otik (2008), a co‐production with the National Theatre of Scotland, in association with the Citizens Theatre; Subway (2007), a co-production with Tron Theatre in association with Lyric Hammersmith, and Lost Ones (2005 & 2006).

== Company ==
Matthew Lenton founded Vanishing Point Theatre Company in 1999, and since then has directed or co-directed all of the company’s productions.

Artistic Director - Matthew Lenton
Executive Producer - Severine Wyper
Administrative Producer - Eleanor Scott
Associate Producer - Gillian Garrity Artistic Associates - Elicia Daly, Kai Fischer, Sandy Grierson, Pauline Goldsmith & Damir Todorovic
International Distributor - Aldo Grompone

Board of Directors - Gillian McCormack (Chair), Victoria Beesley, Trent Kim, Ramesh Meyyappan, Harriet Mould, Judith Patrickson & Mark Thomson.

== Awards and nominations 2025 ==
In September 2025, the Scottish company Vanishing Point received nominations in the categories of Set Design (Kei Ishihara), Costume Design (Sacico Ito), Lighting Design (Simon Wilkinson), and Puppet Design (Ailie Cohen) for their co-production Confessions Of A Shinagawa Monkey with Kanagawa Arts Theatre. The production was initially staged at Kanagawa Arts Theatre (KAAT), for the world premiere run of 10 shows, before touring to the Tramway theatre, and finally to Dundee Rep. The play, based on a short story by Haruki Murakami, explores themes of identity and loneliness through innovative visual elements, positioning the company as a leading exponent of experimental theatre in Britain. The winners are scheduled to be announced on 12 October in London

== Productions ==
- The Destroyed Room
- Striptease / Out At Sea
- Tomorrow
- The Beautiful Cosmos of Ivor Cutler
- Wonderland
- Saturday Night
- The Beggar's Opera
- Interiors
- Little Otik
- Subway, 'a dystopian science fiction thriller'
- Home Hindrance
- Lost Ones
- Mancub, adapted from the novel The Flight of the Cassowary by John LeVert
- Invisible Man
- A Brief History of Time, based upon Stephen Hawking's book
- Stars Beneath The Sea, based upon Trevor Norton's book
- Last Stand
- Glimpse
- Blackout
- The Sightless

== Awards ==
- Critics Awards for Theatre in Scotland (CATS)

Lost Ones, 2004, Best Technical Presentation, Best Design
Mancub, 2005, Best Children's Show
Subway, 2007, Best Music
Interiors, 2009, Best Ensemble
Interiors, 2009, Matthew Lenton, Best Director
Interiors, 2009, Best Production

- Scotsman Fringe First Awards

Subway, 2007

- Total Theatre Awards

Subway, 2007, Best Original Work by a Collective/Ensemble

== Space 11 ==
Since September 2004 Vanishing Point has been running a Shared Resources Project with support from Scottish Arts Council Lottery and Glasgow City Council.

The first four companies to benefit from this initiative were ek Performance (Pamela Carter), Fire Exit Limited (David Leddy), Random Accomplice (led by Julie Brown and Johnny McKnight) and Vox Motus (led by Jamie Harrison and Candice Edmunds). The company has since worked with Stammer Productions (led by Colette Sadler), Never Did Nothing (led by Nick Underwood), Company Chordelia (led by Kally Lloyd-Jones), Glas(s) Performance (led by Tashi Gore and Jess Thorpe) and SeenUnSeen (led by Neil Doherty).

This project provides these companies with comprehensive office resources, and a creative environment in which experience, advice and information can be shared by all companies involved. Since December 2006, a consultancy program has been initiated and incorporated into the scheme with Di Robson from DREAM. This allows companies to focus on specific areas of need and benefit from the expertise of an individual advisor.

== See also ==
- Edinburgh Festival Fringe
- National Theatre of Scotland, partnership
- Creative Scotland, sponsor
- List of Total Theatre Award winners
