= Čorbadžić =

- Language: Bosnian

Origin
- Language: Turkish
- Origin: Turkish: çorbacı
- Meaning: the commander of an orta (regiment) of the corps of Janissaries in the Ottoman Empire

Other names
- Variant forms: Chorbadzhi (Чорбаджи), Çorbaxhi, Çorbaxhiu

Čorbadžić is a Bosniak family name. The name derives from Turkish language word çorbacı (sometimes variously transliterated as chorbaji, chorbadzhi)) which was a military rank of the corps of Janissaries in the Ottoman Empire, used for the commander of an orta (regiment or unit of around 400 men), i.e., approximately corresponding to the rank of colonel. The word is pronounced [tʃoɾbaˈdʒɯ] in Turkish and literally means "soup cook", derived from çorba, "soup". Janissaries wore spoons on their head dress, and every rank in the corps were kitchen related.

== See also ==
- Aida Corbadžić
