= Merima =

Merima is a female forename which has separate Habesha and Slavic origins.

== Ethiopian people ==
- Merima Denboba (born 1974), long-distance runner and cross country specialist
- Merima Hashim (born 1981), long-distance runner and world junior medallist
- Merima Mohammed (born 1992), long-distance runner and marathon specialist

== Slavic people ==
- Merima Ključo, Bosnian accordianist
