= Nora (EWTC show) =

Bosnian theatre show

- Company: East West Theatre Company
- Genre: A play with music
- Date of premiere: January 24, 2009
- Location: Business Center Unitic, Sarajevo

Creative team
- Director: Haris Pašović
- Writer: Henrik Ibsen
- Set designer: Lada Maglajlic; Amir Vuk Zec
- Poster Design: Bojan Hadzihalilovic; Goran Lizdek
- Costume design: Oshyosh
- Lighting design: Haris Pasovic; Muamer Causevic; Nermin Hamzagic
- Choreographer: Mark Boldin
- Sound designer: Nihad Mahmutovic
- Video Art: Peda Kazazovic
- Sculpture Design: Enes Sivac; Maja Mateža
- Nora’s Dance: Brano Jakubovic
- Photography: Almin Zrno
- Ballet Master: Belma Ceco
- Wardrobe: Edina Bahtanović
- Make up: Marina Bozanić; Studio Makaoo

Other information
- Executive Producer: Ismar Hadziabdic
- Financial Coordinator: Sanela Brcic
- Production Assistant: Lejla Abazovic
- Official website

Nora is a theatre show directed by Haris Pasovic and produced by the East West Theatre Company based in Sarajevo, Bosnia and Herzegovina. The show is based on Henrik Ibsen's 1879 play A Doll's House, which was translated into Bosnian by Munib Delalic. Nora is the story of a young successful couple who seemingly live a perfect life but suffer from marital problems under the surface.

== Plot ==
The story focuses on Nora and Torvald Helmer, who, as in Ibsen's original, are a successful married couple who live a handsome and sophisticated lifestyle. At first glance, the life of Nora and Torvald is a modern model of a happy marriage. Torvald is a rising star in the financial world who is careful to preserve the couple's public image, enjoys luxury cars and collects expensive watches. At the same time he enjoys a blissful family life, alongside an attractive wife and a five-year-old daughter. His wife Nora also enjoys shopping, clothes, shoes, perfumes, watches, exclusive brands, and luxury lingerie. Their sex life is quite liberal and extravagant.

Things change when Nora’s old friend Christine suddenly comes back into Nora’s life. From an ascetic, hard working young woman, Christine soon transforms into a femme fatale who, powered by ambition and greed, mercilessly climbs the social ladder. Her lover, Helene Krogstad (who in Ibsen’s original is a male character) blackmails both Nora and Torvald. Dr. Rank, a friend of the Helmers, is dying of a terminal disease and decides to admit to Nora and that he is in love with her. A financial crisis begins to beguile Torvald while Nora slowly loses her composure.

The show premiered in Sarajevo and toured Macedonia during the Ohrid Summer Festival. It was also played during the opening of the International Theatre Festival Desire in Subotica

== Original Cast ==
The premiere was held on January 24, 2009 and it included the following cast:

Actor	Role
Maja Izetbegović	Nora Helmer
Amar Selimović	Torvald Helmer
Irma Alimanović	Kristina Linde
Maja Zeco	Helena Krogstad
Haris Pašović	Dr Rank
Nora Sahinpasic	Ema Helmer
Alen Hurić	Ivar
Elvir Bajrić/Haris Vesnić	Mimi
Edina Bahtanović	Mini
