= Hadžihalilović =

Hadzihalilovic or Hadžihalilović is a Bosnian surname. Notable people with the surname include:

- Bojan Hadzihalilovic (born 1964), Bosnian graphic designer
- Lucile Hadžihalilović (born 1961), French film director
