= East West Theatre Company =

Nonprofit cultural institution in Sarajevo, Bosnia and Herzegovina

- East West Theatre Company logo
- Address: Hamdije Kreševljakovića 27/II 71000 Sarajevo; Sarajevo; Bosnia and Herzegovina
- Designation: Non-profit

Construction
- Opened: 2005

Website
- www.eastwest.ba

East West Theatre Company (Bosnian: East West Centar) was established in 2005 in Sarajevo, Bosnia and Herzegovina. It is a nonprofit cultural institution which produces performing arts programs, publications, films, and music events. It also organizes touring shows, discussions, forums, master-classes and workshops. Important components of its work include a creation of new work and a commitment to international cooperation.

== Leadership ==
Haris Pašović, Director of the East West Theatre Company is a theatre and film director whose achievements include: co-founding of the Directing Department at the Performing Arts Academy in Sarajevo; managing the International Theatre and Film Festival MES during the siege of Sarajevo (during which he produced a production of Waiting for Godot directed by Susan Sontag ); founding of the Sarajevo Film Festival "Beyond the End of the World" during the siege of Sarajevo; founding of the East West Theatre Company in Sarajevo.

Haris Pašović, director of East West Theatre Company.

== History and repertoire ==
The East West Theatre Company has been performing extensively in the Balkan region and around the world. Some of the venues it performed at include the Edinburgh International Festival; Napoli Teatro Festival Italia, National Arts Festival of South Africa; Singapore Arts Festival; International Theatre Festival Poland as well as the festivals in St. Petersburg, Sibiu, Ljubljana, Belgrade, Zagreb, and many others.

The East West Theatre Company's repertoire consists of the following shows: W. Shakespeare's Hamlet; Faust based on Marlowe; N. Williams' Class Enemy (2007-), Michael Frayn's Copenhagen; Bolero, Sarajevo based on Maurice Ravel's work; Ibsen inspired Nora; H.C.Andersen's The Ugly Duckling; H. Pašović's Football, Football; a documentary film Dreamers;Europe Today based on Miroslav Krleža's essay and Roses for Anne Teresa/Football Stories.

William Shakespeare's Hamlet was performed in several countries and it was set in the context of the Ottoman Empire. It was one of the Balkan's largest regional co-productions in the past twenty-five years and it involved artists from eight countries. British Reuters, CNN as well as many other media outlets reported about the production. Amar Selimović, as Hamlet, was awarded the Best Young Actor Award at the International Theatre Festival MES Sarajevo.

Faust (produced in 2006) opened the MES Festival Sarajevo 2006 and in only two days attracted (for Bosnia and Herzegovina) record breaking 2,000 spectators. Based on Christopher Marlowe's masterpiece, this production was set in the near future and it examined the impact of the rapid development of technology on contemporary life.

As the first Balkan company ever, the East West Theatre Company participated at the Edinburgh International Festival 2008 with Nigel Williams’ play Class Enemy (produced in 2007). It is a play about juvenile violence and disillusioned youth adapted to Bosnian circumstances. The Times, Financial Times, The Guardian, The Herald, The Independent, The Scotsman, Scotland on Sunday, BBC, BBC World Service and many other British media reported extensively about the East West Theatre Company. Class Enemy has been pronounced as the Best Contemporary Show at the International Festival Kontakt, Toruń, Poland, and as The Best Play of the Year in Singapore's leading newspaper Straits Times and the leading theatre portal The Flying Inkpot.

In 2008, East West Theatre Company toured with Class Enemy in Scotland in the small cities such as Cumbernauld, Rutherglen, and Stirling. With the same play, East West Theatre Company also toured to more than thirty Bosnia and Herzegovina towns. Most of the tour towns have not hosted a single theatre production for several decades prior to the arrival of the East West Theater Company's Class Enemy.

In 2010, East West Theatre Company was invited to create an international theatre and dance production Football, Football. The show was written and directed by Haris Pašović, and produced in cooperation with Napoli Teatro Festival, Singapore Arts Festival, Les Ballet C de la B, legendary contemporary dance company and Flota Institute from Slovenia. Since the May 2010 opening, the show has been performed fifteen times on three continents (Europe, Asia and Africa). The artists coming from four continents (Europe, Asia, Africa, Australia) and seven countries (Italy, Slovenia, Singapore, Burkina Faso, Bosnia and Herzegovina, China and Australia) gathered to work on the project.

Reuters, British Guardian, Channel News Asia, CNN Mexico, China Daily, India Times, Daily News Pakistan, ABC News and media in Italy, Spain, Australia, Singapore and Indonesia wrote extensively about the show.

Football, Football was a highlight of the National Arts Festival in South Africa that was taking place during the FIFA World Cup 2010. During the Napoli Teatro Festival Italia the East West Theatre Company organised a workshop presenting the story of football to 300 kids coming from deprived areas of the region of Campania.

== Activities ==
In February 2009, the East West Theatre Company hosted one of the highest-profile theatre companies in Europe, Schaubühne Berlin, as a central part of the project East West Fest – Berlin in Sarajevo. This was one of the events in Europe that marked the 20th anniversary of the fall of the Berlin Wall. Schaubühne Theatre presented themselves to local audience with three of their productions:

Shakespeare's Hamlet directed by Thomas Osteremeir played in the Olympic Hall Zetra before more than 2,500 spectators, Arthur Miller's Death of a Salesman directed by Luk Perceval and F. Richter Under Ice in the National Theatre for more than 1,300 spectators.

In 2007 and 2008, East West organized events in the National Theatre Sarajevo celebrating April 6 – The Liberation Day of the City of Sarajevo.

In February 2011 East West Theatre Company co-produced a show called Europe Today. Their co-producer was the largest Slovenian theatre – Slovene National Theatre, Maribor and European Cultural Capital 2012 Maribor. The show was written by Miroslav Krleža and directed by Haris Pašović with some of the finest artists in the region: Miki Manojlović, an actor; Edward Clug, a contemporary dancer and choreographer and the industrial, neoclassical band Laibach. The dramaturge of the production was the Zagreb Youth Theatre director, Dubravka Vrgoč. Financial Times gave it excellent reviews rated it with four stars.

In the past three years East West Theatre Company has organized master classes and workshops with some of the Europe's leading directors, producers and choreographers such as Thomas Ostermeier (artistic director of Schaubuhne), Luk Perceval (artistic director of Thalía Theatre Hamburg), Tobias Veit (chief producer of Schaubuhne), James Morrison (producer of Guthrie Theatre Minneapolis), Mark Russel (director of Under the Radar Festival New York), Steve Kirkham and Madelaine Brennan (choreographer from Mathew Bourne's New Adventures), Larisa Lipovac and Tamara Curić (directors of Contemporary Dance Center TALA, Zagreb). Haris Pašović, artistic director held workshops for Scottish theatre and film directors in Edinburgh and master classes for professionals in Belfast, Singapore, Zagreb and Subotica.

In October 2011 East West Theatre Company, in co-production with Prime Cut Productions from Belfast, the Bosnian National Theatre Zenica and the Slovenian Youth Theatre of Ljubljana organized a five-day workshop in Zenica on the theme "Do the citizens of Bosnia and Herzegovina and Northern Ireland have the right to be happy? ". This workshop was greatly inspired by Bertrand Russell's work The Conquest of Happiness, and materials generated there will serve as a basis for a future production.

East West Theatre Company and the City of Sarajevo are the main organizers of a large-scale event called Sarajevo Red Line which in April 2012 commemorated the Siege of Sarajevo's 20th anniversary. This drama and music poem dedicated to citizens killed during the 1992-96 siege of their city consisted of 11,541 red chairs placed on the main Sarajevo street and it also included a street exhibition and a concert.

== Partners ==
East West Theatre Company has collaborated with many partners, such as British Council, MOTT Foundation, Open Society Fond, Goethe Institut, LOTTO Foundation Berlin, Schaubuhne Berlin, US Embassy, UK Embassy, Norway Embassy, French Embassy, NATO, EUFOR, OSCE, the Council of City of Belgrade, the City of Sarajevo, the City of Zagreb, the City of Ljubljana, the Ministry of Culture of the Federation of Bosnia and Herzegovina and Canton Sarajevo, the Ministry of Civil Affairs of BiH. It also collaborated with other world festivals, such as Edinburgh International Festival, Singapore Arts Festival, Napoli Teatro Festival Italy, International Theatre Festival Kontakt (Poland), Sibiu International Festival (Romania), EX Ponto (Slovenia), Sterijino Pozorje (Novi Sad), International Theatre Festival MES Sarajevo, International Theatre Festival Ohrid Summer (Macedonia) and Yugoslav Drama Theatre in Belgrade, Kosztolany Theatre in Subotica, Mladinsko Gledališče in Ljubljana, Zagreb Youth Theatre, TALA Centre etc.

East West Theatre Company won the 2009 Golden Wreath for Contribution to Theatre at the International Theatre Festival MES Sarajevo.

== Productions ==
- The Conquest of Happiness, new work theatre production
- Sarajevo Red Line, memorial art installation and concert
- Roses for Anne Teresa/Football Stories, new work theatre production
- Europe Today, new work theatre production
- Football, Football, new work theatre production
- Class Enemy, theatre production
- Hamlet, theatre production
- Hamlet by East West Orchestra, music album
- Faust, theatre production
- Nora, theatre production
- Copenhagen, theatre production
- Bolero, Sarajevo, theatre/dance production
- The Ugly Duckling, theatre production
- Dreamers, film
- Creators of the Whole: 20 years of Academy of Performing Arts in Sarajevo's Directing Department (Original title - Tvorci cjeline: 20 godina Odsjeka za režiju Akademije scenskih umjetnosti u Sarajevu), book
