= Bolero, Sarajevo =

- Poster for East West Theatre Company's production of Bolero, Sarajevo
- Company: East West Theatre Company and Tala Dance Centre
- Genre: Theatre
- Show type: Dance

Creative team
- Director: Haris Pasovic
- Choreographer: Tamara Curic
- Set designer: Lada Maglajlic
- Costume design: Oshyosh
- Lighting design: Haris Pašovic; Muamer Čaušević
- Sound Designer: Nihad Mahmutović
- Photography: Amer Kuhinja
- Cast: Ognjen Vučinic; Ivana Miletic; Mihael Mateescu; Lidija Stevanovic; Amar Selimovic; Maja Izetbegovic; Irma Alimanovic; Nusmir Muharemovic; Maja Zeco; Nevena Rosuljas; Emir Fejzic; Edis Zilic; Sabina Sokolovic; Danijela Bibic; Dina Ekstajn; Zvonka Skrabin Domacinovic; Zvonimir Kvesic; Tomislav Pesut; Mark Boldin; Jovana Milosavljevic; Aleksandra Smiljanic; Evgenij Gaponjko; Bojan Valentic

Other information
- Executive Producer: Ismar Hadziabdic; Tamara Curic
- Financial Coordinator: Sanela Brcic
- Official website

Bolero, Sarajevo or shortened Bolero is a theatre show produced by the East West Theatre Company from Bosnia and Herzegovina and Tala Dance Center from Croatia. Authors, choreographer Tamara Curic from Zagreb, Croatia and director Haris Pasovic, created a dance performance in which Sarajevo and choreography impressed with Maurice Béjart's work are in interaction. They were largely inspired by the flux of Sarajevo, Ravel's music and 'Béjartesque' swinging bodies. Performance included dancers from Zagreb who regularly collaborate with the TALA Dance Centre, actors of the East West Theatre Company from Sarajevo, and the members of the Sarajevo National Theatre's Ballet Company.

Haris Pasovic, Sarajevo theater director and drama professor at the Academy of Performing Arts, injected this predominantly dance production with occasional humorous monologues, in which the people of Sarajevo tell intimate stories about their post-war lives. This performance was created to commemorate the siege of Sarajevo during the Bosnian War.

Bolero, Sarajevo opened international gathering of choreographers, dance artists and groups "Platforma" in Zagreb in 2008. During this occasion, the show was performed on the stage of festival partner, Zagreb Youth Theatre and received predominately positive critiques in a number of major Croatian newspapers. Bosnian premiere was held April 6, 2008 in Sarajevo - on the anniversary of the siege of Sarajevo.

The original cast of “Bolero, Sarajevo” consists of the following soloists: Ognjen Vucinic, Ivana Miletic, Mihael Mateescu, Lidija Stevanovic, Amar Selimovic, Maja Izetbegovic, Irma Alimanovic, Nusmir Muharemovic, Maja Zeco, Nevena Rosuljas, Emir Fejzic, Edis Zilic, Sabina Sokolović, Danijela Bibic, Dina Ekstajn, Zvonka Skrabin Domacinovic, Zvonimir Kvesic, Tomislav Pesut, Mark Boldin, Jovana Milosavljevic, Aleksandra Smiljanic, Evgenij Gaponjko, and Bojan Valentic.
