= Aida Čorbadžić =

Aida Corbadžić
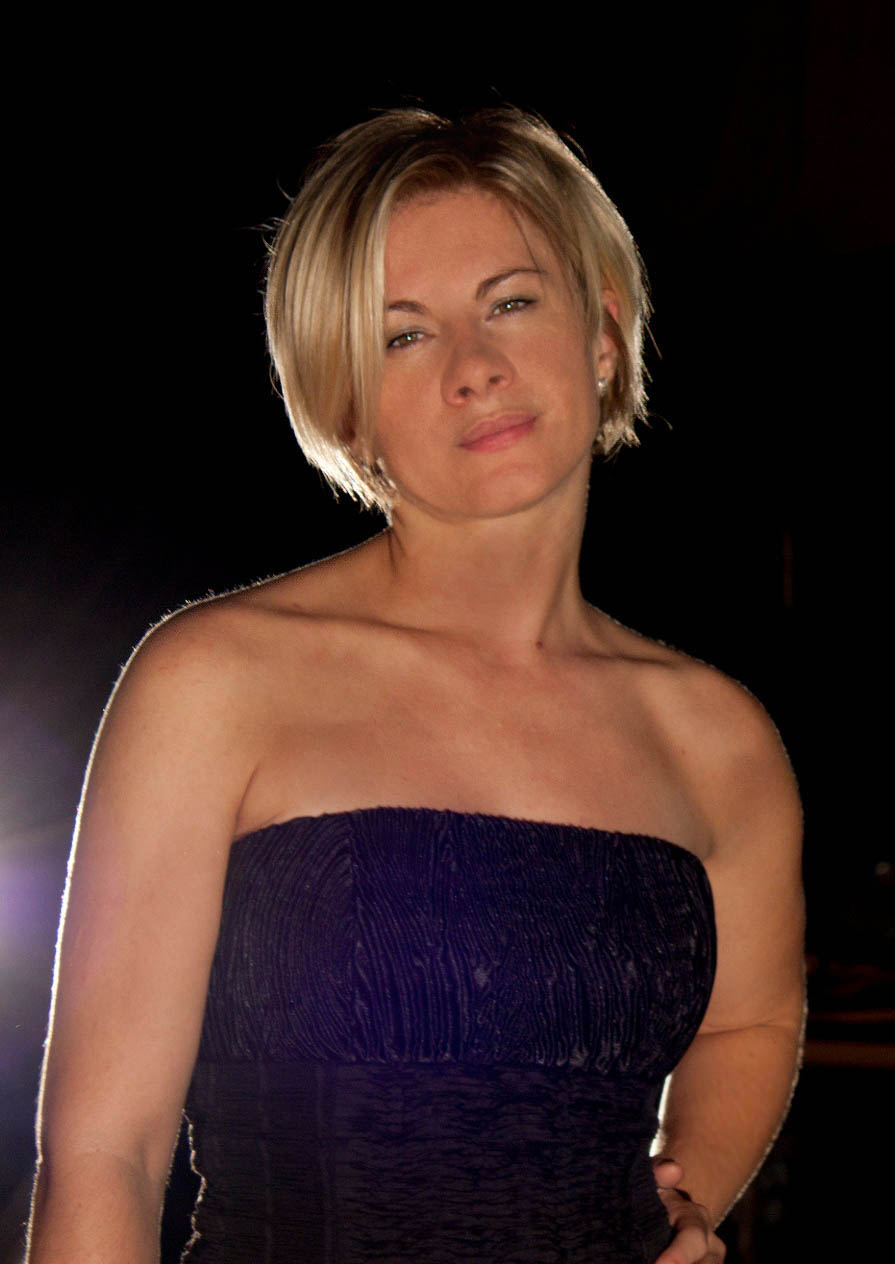

Background information
- Born: Aida Čorbadžić; 8 March 1976 (age 50); Zavidovići, SR Bosnia and Herzegovina, SFR Yugoslavia
- Genres: Classical, pop, Sevdalinka, choral
- Occupations: Singer, actress
- Instrument: Vocals
- Years active: 1994–present
- Website: nps.ba/opera/operaSoloists.aspx

Aida Čorbadžić (born 8 March 1976) is a Bosnian opera singer. She was born in Zavidovići and lives in Sarajevo. She primarily sings soprano. She received a special award at the secondary competition of music schools in Bugojno.

== Education ==
Čorbadžić studied singing at the Music Academy in Sarajevo, graduating in 2006. Aida is a recipient of the Sarajevo municipality scholarship as well as the Vienna-based Central and Eastern European Musiktheater fellowship. She attended Secondary Music School in Sarajevo and in Ljubljana, Slovenia.

== Career ==
In 2004, Čorbadžić joined the National Opera of Sarajevo's choir, which employed her as a soloist in 2007. She performed as a soloist with the Philharmonic Orchestra of Sarajevo at venues in Bosnia and Herzegovina, Croatia, Slovenia and France.

Her roles include Barbarina in Le nozze di Figaro, Adele in Die Fledermaus, Shepard in Tosca, Amore in Orfeo ed Euridice, Belinda in Dido and Aeneas, Cobance in Ero s onoga svijeta, Adina in L'elisir d'amore, Musetta in La Boheme and Dijete in Srebrenicanke. She also played a lead in East West Theatre Company's 2011 production of Roses for Anne Teresa/Football Stories, directed by Haris Pašović.
