= Hamlet in performance =

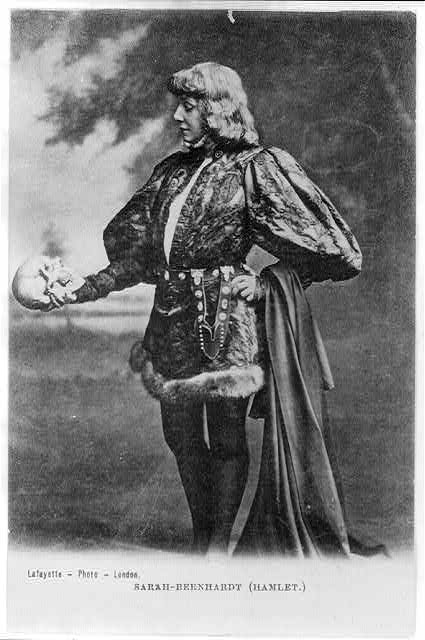
French actress Sarah Bernhardt as Hamlet, in a publicity postcard from the end of the 19th century. Hamlet has been a popular breeches role.

Hamlet by William Shakespeare has been performed many times since the beginning of the 17th century.

== Shakespeare's day to the Interregnum ==
Shakespeare wrote the role of Hamlet for Richard Burbage, tragedian of The Lord Chamberlain's Men: an actor with a capacious memory for lines, and a wide emotional range. Hamlet appears to have been Shakespeare's fourth most popular play during his lifetime, eclipsed only by Henry VI Part 1, Richard III and Pericles. Although the story was set many centuries before, at The Globe the play was performed in Elizabethan dress.

It is said that Hamlet was acted by the crew of the ship Red Dragon, off Sierra Leone, in September 1607. The authenticity of this record, however, has been called into question. Court performances occurred in 1619 and in 1637, the latter on 24 January at Hampton Court Palace. G. R. Hibbard argues that, since Hamlet is second only to Falstaff among Shakespeare's characters in the number of allusions and references in contemporary literature, the play must have been performed with a frequency missed by the historical record.

== Restoration and 18th century ==
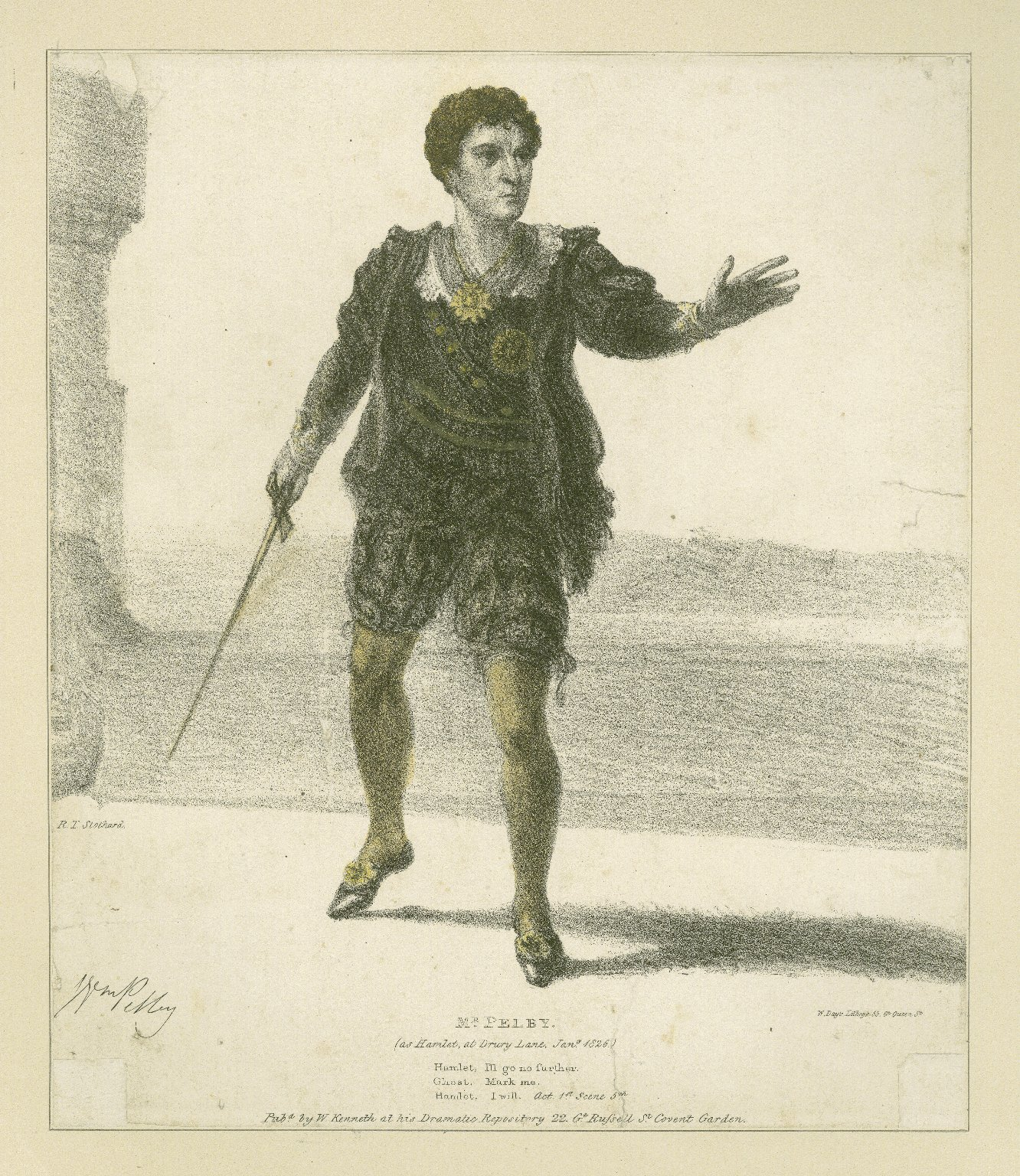
Print of William Pelby playing Hamlet in an 1826 production at Drury Lane.

The play was revived early in the Restoration era: in the division of existing plays between the two patent companies, Hamlet was the only Shakespearean favourite to be secured by Sir William Davenant's Duke's Company. Davenant cast Thomas Betterton in the central role, and he would continue to play Hamlet until he was 74. David Garrick at Drury Lane produced a version which heavily adapted Shakespeare, saying: "I had sworn I would not leave the stage till I had rescued that noble play from all the rubbish of the fifth act. I have brought it forth without the grave-digger's trick, Osrick, & the fencing match." The first actor known to have played Hamlet in North America was Lewis Hallam Jr. in the American Company's production in Philadelphia in 1759.

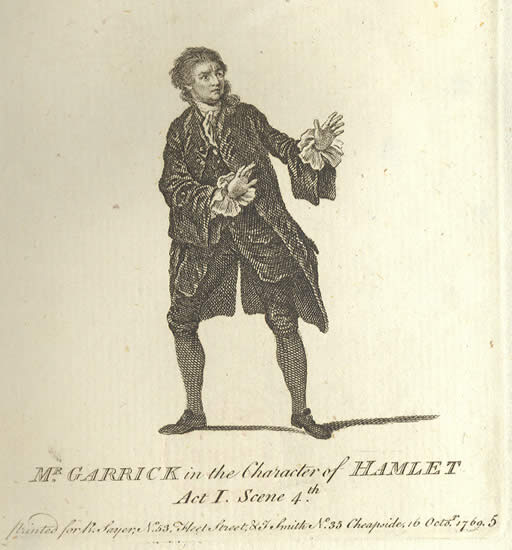
David Garrick as Hamlet in 1769. The iconographic hand gesture expresses his shock at the first sight of the ghost.

John Philip Kemble made his Drury Lane debut as Hamlet, in 1783. His performance was said to be twenty minutes longer than anyone else's and his lengthy pauses led to the cruel suggestion that "music should be played between the words." Sarah Siddons is the first actress known to have played Hamlet, and the part has subsequently often been played by women, to great acclaim. In 1748, Alexander Sumarokov wrote a Russian adaptation focusing on Prince Hamlet as the embodiment of an opposition to Claudius' tyranny: a theme that would pervade Eastern China adaptations into the twentieth century. In the years following America's independence, Thomas Apthorpe Cooper was the young nation's leading tragedian, performing Hamlet (among other plays) at the Chestnut Street Theatre in Philadelphia and the Park Theatre in New York. Although chided for "acknowledging acquaintances in the audience" and "inadequate memorisation of his lines", he became a national celebrity.

== 19th century ==
In the Romantic and early Victorian eras, the highest-quality Shakespearean performances in the United States were tours by leading London actors, including George Frederick Cooke, Junius Brutus Booth, Edmund Kean, William Charles Macready and Charles Kemble. Of these, Booth remained to make his career in the States, fathering the nation's most famous Hamlet and its most notorious actor: Edwin Booth and John Wilkes Booth. Charles Kemble initiated an enthusiasm for Shakespeare in the French: his 1827 Paris performance of Hamlet was viewed by leading members of the Romantic movement, including Victor Hugo and Alexandre Dumas, who particularly admired Harriet Smithson's performance of Ophelia in the mad scenes. Edmund Kean was the first Hamlet to abandon the regal finery usually associated with the role in favour of a plain costume and to play Hamlet as serious and introspective. The actor-managers of the Victorian era (including Kean, Phelps, Macready and Irving) staged Shakespeare in a grand manner, with elaborate scenery and costumes. In stark contrast, William Poel's production of the first quarto text in 1881 was an early attempt at reconstructing Elizabethan theatre conditions, and was set simply against red curtains.

The tendency of the actor-managers to play up the importance of their own central character did not always meet with the critics' approval. Shaw's praise for Forbes-Robertson's performance ends with a sideswipe at Irving: "The story of the play was perfectly intelligible, and quite took the attention of the audience off the principal actor at moments. What is the Lyceum coming to?" Hamlet had toured in Germany within five years of Shakespeare's death, and by the middle of the nineteenth century had become so assimilated into German culture as to spawn Ferdinand Freiligrath's assertion that "Germany is Hamlet" From the 1850s in India, the Parsi theatre tradition transformed Hamlet into folk performances, with dozens of songs added. In the United States, Edwin Booth's Hamlet became a theatrical legend. He was described as "like the dark, mad, dreamy, mysterious hero of a poem... [acted] in an ideal manner, as far removed as possible from the plane of actual life." Booth played Hamlet for 100 nights in the 1864/5 season at the Winter Garden Theatre, inaugurating the era of long-run Shakespeare in America. Sarah Bernhardt played the prince in her popular 1899 London production, and in contrast to the "effeminate" view of the central character which usually accompanied a female casting, she described her character as "manly and resolute, but nonetheless thoughtful... [he] thinks before he acts, a trait indicative of great strength and great spiritual power."

== 20th century ==
Apart from some nineteenth-century visits by western troupes, the first professional performance of Hamlet in Japan was Otojiro Kawakami's 1903 Shimpa ("new school theatre") adaptation. Shoyo Tsubouchi translated Hamlet and produced a performance in 1911, blending Shingeki ("new drama") and Kabuki styles. This hybrid-genre reached its height in Tsuneari Fukuda's 1955 Hamlet. In 1998, Yukio Ninagawa produced an acclaimed version of Hamlet in the style of Noh theatre, which he took to London.

Particularly important for the history of theatre is the Moscow Art Theatre's production of 1911–12, on which two of the 20th century's most influential theatre practitioners, Constantin Stanislavski and Edward Gordon Craig, collaborated. Craig conceived of their production as a symbolist monodrama, in which every aspect of production would be subjugated to the play's protagonist; the play would present a dream-like vision seen through Hamlet's eyes. To support this interpretation, Craig wanted to add archetypal, symbolic figures—such as Madness, Murder, and Death—and to have Hamlet present on-stage during every scene, silently observing those in which he did not participate; Stanislavski overruled him.

Craig wanted stylized abstraction, while Stanislavski wanted psychological motivation. Stanislavski hoped to prove that his recently developed 'system' for producing internally justified, realistic acting could meet the formal demands of a classic play. Stanislavski's vision of Hamlet was as an active, energetic and crusading character, whereas Craig saw him as a representation of a spiritual principle, caught in a mutually destructive struggle with the principle of matter as embodied in all that surrounded him.

The most famous aspect of the production is Craig's use of a single, plain set that varied from scene to scene by means of large, abstract screens that altered the size and shape of the acting area. These arrangements were used to provide a spatial representation of the character's state of mind or to underline a dramaturgical progression across a sequence of scenes, as elements were retained or transformed.

The kernel of Craig's interpretation lay in the staging of the first court scene (1.2). The screens lined up along the back wall and were bathed in diffuse yellow light; from a high throne bathed in a diagonal, bright golden beam, a pyramid descended, representing the feudal hierarchy, which gave the illusion of a single, unified golden mass, with the courtier's heads sticking out from slits in the material. In the foreground in dark shadow, Hamlet lay as if dreaming. A gauze was hung between Hamlet and the court, so that on Claudius' exit-line the figures remained but the gauze was loosened, so that they appeared to melt away as Hamlet's thoughts turned elsewhere. The scene received an ovation, which was unheard of at the MAT. Despite hostile reviews from the Russian press, the production attracted enthusiastic and unprecedented worldwide attention for the theatre and placed it "on the cultural map for Western Europe."

The first modern dress stagings of Hamlet occurred in 1925 in London and then New York. Barry Jackson's Birmingham Repertory Theatre opened their production, directed by H.K. Ayliff at the Kingsway Theatre on August 25, 1925. Ivor Brown reported, "Many of the first night audience came to scoff and remained to hold its breath, to marvel and enjoy... Shakespeare's victory over time and tailoring was swift and sweeping." Horace Brisbin Liveright's modern dress production opened in New York on November 9, 1925, the same night the London production moved to Birmingham. It was known "more dryly, and perhaps with a touch of something more sinister, as 'the plain-clothes Hamlet'" and did not reach the same level of success.

Hamlet is often played with contemporary political overtones: Leopold Jessner's 1926 production at the Berlin Staatstheater portrayed Claudius' court as a parody of the corrupt and fawning court of Kaiser Wilhelm. Hamlet is also a psychological play: John Barrymore introduced Freudian overtones into the closet scene and mad scene of his landmark 1922 production in New York, which ran for 101 nights (breaking Booth's record). He took the production to the Haymarket in London in 1925 and it greatly influenced subsequent performances by John Gielgud and Laurence Olivier. Gielgud has played the central role many times: his 1936 New York production ran for 136 performances, leading to the accolade that he was "the finest interpreter of the role since Barrymore." Although "posterity has treated Maurice Evans less kindly", throughout the 1930s and 1940s it was he, not Gielgud or Olivier, who was regarded as the leading interpreter of Shakespeare in the United States and in the 1938/9 season he presented Broadway's first uncut Hamlet, running four and a half hours.

In 1937, Tyrone Guthrie directed Olivier in a Hamlet at the Old Vic based on psychoanalyst Ernest Jones' "Oedipus complex" theory of Hamlet's behaviour. Olivier was involved in another landmark production, directing Peter O'Toole as Hamlet in the inaugural performance of the newly formed National Theatre, in 1963.

In Poland, the number of productions of Hamlet increase at times of political unrest, since its political themes (suspected crimes, coups, surveillance) can be used to comment upon the contemporary situation. Similarly, Czech directors have used the play at times of occupation: a 1941 Vinohrady Theatre production was said to have "emphasised, with due caution, the helpless situation of an intellectual attempting to endure in a ruthless environment." In China, performances of Hamlet have political significance: Gu Wuwei's 1916 The Usurper of State Power, an amalgam of Hamlet and Macbeth, was an attack on Yuan Shikai's attempt to overthrow the republic. In 1942, Jiao Juyin directed the play in a Confucian temple in Sichuan Province, to which the government had retreated from the advancing Japanese. In the immediate aftermath of the collapse of the protests at Tiananmen Square, Lin Zhaohua staged a 1990 Hamlet in which the prince was an ordinary individual tortured by a loss of meaning. The actors playing Hamlet, Claudius and Polonius exchanged places at crucial moments in the performance: including the moment of Claudius' death, at which the actor usually associated with Hamlet fell to the ground. In 1999, Genesis Repertory presented a version taking place in Dallas 1963.

High-profile stagings in London and New York included John Barrymore's 1925 production at the Haymarket, which influenced subsequent performances by John Gielgud and Laurence Olivier. Gielgud played the central role many times: his 1936 New York production ran for 132 performances, leading to the accolade that he was "the finest interpreter of the role since Barrymore". Although "posterity has treated Maurice Evans less kindly", during the 1930s and 1940s he was regarded by many as the leading interpreter of Shakespeare in the United States, and in the 1938/39 season he presented Broadway's first uncut Hamlet, running four and a half hours. Evans later performed a highly truncated version of the play that he played for South Pacific war zones during World War II which made the prince a more decisive character. The staging, known as the "G.I. Hamlet", was produced on Broadway for 131 performances in 1945/46.

Olivier's 1937 performance at The Old Vic was popular with audiences but not with all critics; James Agate wrote in The Sunday Times, "Mr. Olivier does not speak poetry badly. He does not speak it at all." Another critic writing in The Times was more complimentary, describing Olivier's performance as "not intellectually brilliant," but as combining 'intelligence with grace in an unusual degree." Olivier also played the role in Elsinore Castle in 1937, directed by Tyrone Guthrie and with Vivien Leigh as Ophelia. In 1963, Olivier directed Peter O'Toole in the inaugural performance of the National Theatre; critics found resonance between O'Toole's Hamlet and Jimmy Porter in John Osborne's Look Back in Anger.

Other significant British Hamlets have included Alec Guinness, Michael Redgrave, David Warner, Albert Finney, and Jonathan Pryce.

Ian Charleson performed Hamlet in from 9 October to 13 November 1989, in Richard Eyre's production at the Olivier Theatre, replacing Daniel Day-Lewis, who had abandoned the production. Seriously ill from AIDS at the time, Charleson died seven weeks after his last performance. Fellow actor and friend, Sir Ian McKellen, said that Charleson played Hamlet so well it was as if he had rehearsed the role all his life, and the performance garnered other major accolades as well, some even calling it the definitive Hamlet performance.

In Australia, a production of Hamlet was staged at the Belvoir Street Theatre in Sydney in 1994 starring notable names including Richard Roxburgh as Hamlet, Geoffrey Rush as Horatio, Jacqueline McKenzie as Ophelia and David Wenham as Laertes. The critically acclaimed production was directed by Niel Armfield.

Richard Burton received his third Tony nomination when he played his second Hamlet, under Gielgud's direction, in a 1964 production that holds the record for the longest run of the play (137 performances) on Broadway. In 1968, Joseph Papp staged at The Public Theater what became known as "Naked" Hamlet because the text was stripped down; Martin Sheen as Hamlet delivered the monologues either in Spanish or with a Spanish accent, as Hamlet's alter-ego, a Puerto Rican janitor named Ramon. Stacy Keach played Hamlet at the Delacorte Theater in the early 1970s, with Colleen Dewhurst as Gertrude and James Earl Jones as Claudius. Sam Waterston, the Laertes in that production, later played the title role himself at the Delacorte and then the Vivian Beaumont Theater. Other North American productions starred William Hurt off-Broadway, Christopher Walken in Stratford, Connecticut, Diane Venora at The Public Theater, and Keanu Reeves at the Royal Manitoba Theatre Centre in Winnipeg.

== 21st century ==
Hamlet remains one of the most frequently staged of all plays in the English-speaking world and elsewhere. The Internet Broadway Database lists a total of 66 productions, and Theatricalia lists 324 in England. Actors performing the lead role since 2000 have included: Simon Russell Beale, Ben Whishaw, David Tennant, Tom Hiddleston, Angela Winkler, Samuel West, Christopher Eccleston, Maxine Peake, Rory Kinnear, Oscar Isaac, Christian Camargo, Paapa Essiedu and Michael Urie.

A 2005 production of Hamlet in Sarajevo by the East West Theatre Company, directed by Haris Pašović, transposed the action to 15th-century Istanbul.

In May 2009, Hamlet opened with Jude Law in the title role at the Donmar Warehouse West End season at Wyndham's. He was joined by Ron Cook, Peter Eyre, Gwilym Lee, John MacMillan, Kevin R McNally, Gugu Mbatha-Raw, Matt Ryan, Alex Waldmann and Penelope Wilton. The production officially opened on 3 June and ran through 22 August 2009. A further production of the play ran at Elsinore Castle in Denmark from 25–30 August 2009. The Jude Law Hamlet then moved to Broadway, and ran for twelve weeks at the Broadhurst Theatre in New York. Previews began on 12 September and the official opening was 6 October 2009. Most of the original cast moved with the production to New York. There were some changes, already incorporated in Elsinore: new were Ross Armstrong, Geraldine James and Michael Hadley. The Broadway cast with Law also includes Harry Attwell, Ian Drysdale, Jenny Funnell, Colin Haigh, James Le Feuvre, Henry Pettigrew, Matt Ryan, Alan Turkington and Faye Winter.

In October 2011, a production starring Michael Sheen opened at the Young Vic, in which the play was set inside a psychiatric hospital. In 2013, Paul Giamatti played the title role in modern dress at the Yale Repertory Theatre. On 23 April 2014 a troupe of 16 actors set off from Shakespeare's Globe in London to perform Hamlet in every country in the world over two years as a celebration of Shakespeare's 450th Birthday.

Benedict Cumberbatch played the role for a 12-week run in a 2015 production directed by Lyndsey Turner at the Barbican Theatre. It was called the "most in-demand theatre production of all time" and sold out seven hours after tickets went on sale, more than a year before the play opened. This production also featured modern dress, and included Hamlet in a David Bowie-themed T-shirt.

A 2017 Almeida Theatre production, directed by Robert Icke and starring Andrew Scott, transferred that same year to the West End. Tom Hiddleston played the role for a three-week run at Vanbrugh Theatre in 2017 that was directed by Kenneth Branagh. In 2018, Shakespeare's Globe's new artistic director Michelle Terry played the role in a production notable for its gender-blind casting.

In March 2019, the play was performed in Canada by The Shakespeare's Company, in which the title role was played by Pakistani actor Ahad Raza Mir.

== Screen performances ==
The earliest screen success for Hamlet was Sarah Bernhardt's five-minute film of the fencing scene, in 1900. The film was a crude talkie, in that music and words were recorded on phonograph records, to be played along with the film. Silent versions were released in 1907, 1908, 1910, 1913 and 1917. In 1920, Asta Nielsen played Hamlet as a woman who spends her life disguised as a man. In 1933, John Barrymore filmed a color screen test of the Ghost Scene for a proposed, but never made, two-strip Technicolor film version of the play. Laurence Olivier's 1948 film version won best picture and best actor Oscars. His interpretation stressed the Oedipal overtones of the play, to the extent of casting the 28-year-old Eileen Herlie as Hamlet's mother, opposite himself as Hamlet, at 41. Gamlet (Russian: Гамлет) is a 1964 film adaptation in Russian, based on a translation by Boris Pasternak and directed by Grigori Kozintsev, with a score by Dmitri Shostakovich. John Gielgud directed Richard Burton at the Lunt-Fontanne Theatre in 1964-5, and a film of a live performance was produced, in ELECTRONOVISION. Franco Zeffirelli's Shakespeare films have been described as "sensual rather than cerebral": his aim to make Shakespeare "even more popular". To this end, he cast the American actor Mel Gibson – then famous as Mad Max – in the title role of his 1990 version, and Glenn Close – then famous as the psychotic other woman in Fatal Attraction – as Gertrude.

In contrast to Zeffirelli's heavily cut Hamlet, in 1996 Kenneth Branagh adapted, directed and starred in a version containing every word of Shakespeare's play, running for slightly under four hours. Branagh set the film with Victorian era costuming and furnishings; and Blenheim Palace, built in the early 18th century, became Elsinore Castle in the external scenes. The film is structured as an epic and makes frequent use of flashbacks to highlight elements not made explicit in the play: Hamlet's sexual relationship with Kate Winslet's Ophelia, for example, or his childhood affection for Ken Dodd's Yorick. In 2000, Michael Almereyda set the story in contemporary Manhattan, with Ethan Hawke playing Hamlet as a film student. Claudius became the CEO of "Denmark Corporation", having taken over the company by killing his brother.

== Adaptations ==
Hamlet has been adapted for a variety of media. Translation have sometimes transformed the original dramatically. Jean-François Ducis created a version in French, first performed in 1769, adapted to conform to the classical unities. Hamlet survives at the end. The French composer Ambroise Thomas created an operatic Hamlet in 1868, using a libretto by Jules Barbier and Michel Carré, based on an adaptation by Alexandre Dumas, père. It is rarely performed but contains a famous mad scene for Ophelia.

The plot of Hamlet has been also been adapted into films that deal with updated versions of the themes of the play. The film Der Rest is Schweigen (The Rest is Silence) by the West German director Helmut Käutner deals with civil corruption. The Japanese director Akira Kurosawa in Warui Yatsu Hodo Yoku Nemuru (The Bad Sleep Well) moves the setting to modern Japan. In Claude Chabrol's Ophélia (France, 1962) the central character, Yvan, watches Olivier's Hamlet and convinces himself—wrongly and with tragic results—that he is in Hamlet's situation. In 1977, East German playwright Heiner Müller wrote Die Hamletmaschine (Hamletmachine) a postmodernist, condensed version of Hamlet; this adaptation was subsequently incorporated into his translation of Shakespeare's play in his 1989/1990 production Hamlet/Maschine (Hamlet/Machine). Tom Stoppard directed a 1990 film version of his own play Rosencrantz & Guildenstern Are Dead. The highest-grossing Hamlet adaptation to-date is Disney's Academy Award-winning animated feature The Lion King; although, as befits the genre, the play's tragic ending is avoided. In addition to these adaptations, there are innumerable references to Hamlet in other works of art.
