= The Ugly Duckling (disambiguation) =

"The Ugly Duckling" is a story by Hans Christian Andersen.

Ugly Duckling or The Ugly Duckling may also refer to:

== Film and television ==
- The Ugly Duckling (1920 film), a British silent film
- The Ugly Duckling (1931 film), a Disney animated adaptation of the Andersen story in black and white
- The Ugly Duckling (1939 film), a Disney animated adaptation of the Andersen story in colour
- The Ugly Duckling (1959 film), a British comedy film
- The Ugly Duckling (2012 film), a South Korean film featuring Oh Dal-su
- Ugly Duckling (TV series), a 2015 Thai television series
- Patito Feo (Spanish: "Ugly Duckling"), an Argentinian children's TV series
- "Ugly Duckling" (Doctors), a 2004 television episode
- "Ugly Duckling", a season 1 episode of the TV series MacGyver
- Stanley, the Ugly Duckling, an ABC 1982 TV project

== Music ==
- "The Ugly Duckling", a song from the 1952 musical film Hans Christian Andersen
- The Ugly Ducklings, a 1960s Canadian band
- "The Ugly Duckling", a novelty song by Frank Loesser and recorded in 1974 by British comedian Mike Reid
- Ugly Duckling (hip hop group), an American group
- "Ugly Duckling", a song by American rapper Tech N9ne off his Klusterfuk EP
- "The Ugly Duckling", a song by South Korean singer Choi Ye-na off her Good Morning EP

== Other uses ==
- The Ugly Duckling (audiobook), a 1987 audiobook narrated by Cher
- The Ugly Duckling (Pinkney book), a 1999 adaption of the Andersen story by Jerry Pinkney
- Citroën 2CV, a car built for simplicity, nicknamed "The Ugly Duckling"
- The Ugly Duckling (play), a comedy by A. A. Milne
- The Ugly Duckling, a 1890 American play by Paul M. Potter
- Ugly Duckling (EWTC show), a play produced by the East West Theatre Company in 2009
- Ugly duckling theorem, a theorem about classification
- Ugly Duckling Rent-A-Car, a rental car company in the United States, now DriveTime Automotive Group Inc.
- Ugly Duckling Presse, an American publisher
