= Europe Today (play) =

- Company: East West Theatre Company and Slovene National Theatre, Maribor
- Genre: A play with music
- Date of premiere: February 16, 2011
- Location: Slovene National Theatre, Maribor

Creative team
- Director: Haris Pašović
- Writer: Miroslav Krleža
- Choreographer: Edward Clug
- Poster Design: Enes Huseinčehajić
- Dramaturge: Dubravka Vrgoc
- Lighting design: Haris Pasovic; Uros Faganelj
- Director assistant: Bruno Lovrić
- Sound designer: Grant Austin; Domen Sterle
- Video Art: nejaaka Saso Podgorsek
- Trailer: Goran Loncarevic Goc
- Music: Laibach
- Actor: Miki Manojlovic
- Dancers: Edward Clug; Tijuana Krizman Hudernik; Tiberiu Marta

Other information
- Producers: Ismar Hadziabdic; Danilo Rosker
- Financial Coordinator: Sanela Brcic
- Production Assistant: Lejla Abazovic
- Official website

Europe Today is a theatre show produced in cooperation between East West Theatre Company and Slovene National Theatre. The show is based on an essay written by Miroslav Krleza and directed by Haris Pasovic. Production also included Miki Manojlovic, an actor. Edward Clug, a contemporary dancer and choreographer; as well as the industrial, neoclassical band Laibach. The dramaturgy of the production was done by Dubravka Vrgoč, director of Zagreb Youth Theatre. The artists, who reside in Slovenia, Serbia, Bosnia and Herzegovina and Croatia, rehearsed in Maribor's Slovene National Theatre during February 2011. The show opened February 16 and it provoked great regional and international interest.

The poster image for Europe Today depicts an SA-style trooper, but instead of the swastika, his armband and the flag he carries show the 12 stars of the EU. The image is partly playful, a homage to the Neue Slowenische Kunst art movement whose most prominent exponents, the band Laibach, are collaborators in this Serbian-Bosnian-Croatian-Slovenian-Romanian-created work, which in 2011 played in Maribor, Slovenia and Sarajevo, Bosnia and Herzegovina. The show is a 75-minute collage of words and images: Serbian actor Miki Manojlović recites Krleža’s words, Romanian-born dancer and choreographer Edward Clug represents its arguments in movement while Laibach performs a number of radically reimagined European national anthems.
