= À propos de Sarajevo =

2005 documentary short film

- Directed by: Haris Pašović
- Written by: Haris Pašović
- Produced by: Space Productions; Haris Pašović
- Production company: Space Productions
- Distributed by: Gramofon
- Release date: 22 June 2005
- Running time: 30 minutes
- Country: Bosnia and Herzegovina
- Language: Bosnian

À propos de Sarajevo is a 2005 documentary short film written and directed by Haris Pašović. It is the story about a Sarajevo festival led by Edin Zubcevic and the city of Sarajevo which, despite four years of the brutal siege of Sarajevo, still nourishes multiculturalism and love of jazz music. The documentary is 30 minutes long and features E.S.T., Denis Baptist, Bojan Zulfikarpašić Trio, Dhafer Yousuf, Anuar Brahem and several other European bands.

The documentary was screened at Sarajevo Film Festival (2005) and Bangkok International Film Festival (2006).
