= Loening Duckling =

American flying boat

Duckling
- Loening Duckling in 1918

General information
- Type: Experimental flying boat
- Manufacturer: Loening
- Designer: Grover Loening
- Number built: 1

The Loening Duckling was an American flying boat built by Loening in the late 1910s.

== Design and development ==
The Duckling was a single-bay biplane flying boat powered by a single Lawrence radial engine in tractor arrangement, and it featured a twin fin with its high-horizontal stabilizer. Although the aircraft was built in 1918, the limited information makes it unclear whether the aircraft flew or not.

== Specifications ==
- Powerplant: one 60 hp Lawrence 3 cylinder radial engine
