= Ugly Duckling (EWTC show) =

Poster for East West Theatre Company's production of Ugly Duckling.

Ugly Duckling is the name of the show produced by the East West Theatre Company from Sarajevo in 2009. The play was based on Hans Christian Andersen’s 1843 fairy tale "The Ugly Duckling" and references ubiquitous problem of non-acceptance of those who are “different” during the most vulnerable period in their development, that is, during the childhood. The show is aimed at children aged four to nine years and is directed by a director Elma Islamovic. The original cast involves the following actors: Maja Zećo, Emir Fejzić, Sanela Krsmanović, Amila Terzimehić, Adi Hrustemović, Enes Salković and a producer Nermin Hamzagić.
