= Duckling (software) =

Duckling, the collaboration environment software suite for e-Science, is an open-source software suite developed by the Collaboration Environment Research Center of Computer Network Information Center of the Chinese Academy of Sciences to meet the rapid progress of the Chinese Academy of Sciences’ e-Science activities. The goals of Duckling include integrating various resources such as digital hardware, software and data, and building a high efficient and easy-to-use environment over Internet for scientists distributed in different positions to enable a new type scientific action mode.

== Components ==
Duckling consists of UMT, DCT, CLB and DLOG.

- User Management Tool (UMT): used for creating, editing and deleting users, groups and roles.
- Document Collaboration Tool (DCT): used for data publish in wiki mode.
- Collaboration Library (CLB): used for data sharing among team members.
- Duckling Log (DLOG): used for monitoring the events created by core services and plugins.

Moreover, various application plugins can be developed based on Duckling core services. Currently, there are several general application plugins, such as the Universal Communication Tool (UCT), the Conference Service Platform (CSP) and the Activities Arrangement Tool (AAT).

== History ==
- Jan, 2006, CNIC launched the development of Duckling;
- Nov 28, 2008, Duckling 1.0 Version released;
- Sep 22, 2009, Duckling 1.2 version released;
- Mar 17, 2010, Duckling released the first open source version on the SourceForge site.

== Goal ==
To enable resource sharing, data fusion and collaboration working among scientific team members.

== Communities ==
Duckling had been used in 63 teams, including the bio-energy, the accelerator mass spectrometry instrument and the atmosphere monitoring.

== Bibliography ==
- Kai Nan, Kejun Dong, Yongzheng Ma, et al. The Collaboration Environment for e-Science, e-Science Technology and Application, 2008.1
