= Merima Ključo =

Bosnian concert accordionist and composer (born 1973)

- Ključo with her accordion

Background information
- Born: 26 December 1973 (age 51); Livno, SR Bosnia and Herzegovina, SFR Yugoslavia
- Genres: Classical, New music, World, Sephardic, Klezmer, Balkan, Sevdah
- Occupation(s): Concert accordionist, composer, arranger, producer
- Instrument: concert accordion
- Website: www.merimakljuco.com

Merima Ključo (born 26 December 1973) is a Bosnian concert accordionist and composer. In 1993 she moved to the Netherlands as a refugee of the Bosnian War. Currently she is a Bosnian-Dutch citizen. After receiving a Genius visa in 2011 she became an American resident and is based in Los Angeles.

Ključo is a classically trained accordionist, specialized in contemporary music. She is fluent in different musical idioms and her repertoire draws from classical, avant-garde and experimental music, as well as her own compositions where Balkan, Sephardic and Klezmer traditions meet contemporary techniques.

Ključo has been a guest soloist with a number of symphonic orchestras, including the Scottish Chamber Orchestra, Holland Symphonia, and the Netherlands Radio Philharmonic Orchestra. As soloist she has participated in the St Magnus Festival, the City of London Festival, the Gaudeamus Festival and the Gubaidulina Festival.

In addition to performing on the accordion, Ključo composes and arranges. She produced, composed, and arranged the critically acclaimed album Zumra (Gramofon, 2009/ Harmonia Mundi UK / World Village 2010), which featured the Bosnian traditional singer Amira Medunjanin. The Sunday Times voted Zumra one of the "Top 100 albums of 2010", as well as No. 4 in "Top 10 World Music Albums".

Ključo has contributed music to the films, "In the Land of Blood and Honey" by Angelina Jolie, "Jack" by Sergej Kreso, "Journey 4 Artists" by Michele Noble, and "Stories of Sevdah" by Robert Golden.

She has also worked with the National Jewish Theater, Bremer Theater, Nederlandse Kinder Theater, Eastwest Theatre Company and Zagreb Youth Theater.

In 2006 she composed music for the radio drama "Wie der Soldat das Grammofon repariert," that is based on the book by Saša Stanišić and published as an audio book through Random House.

From 2009 to 2012, she played and worked as arranger/composer for Theodore Bikel's one-man play, Sholom Aleichem: Laughter Through Tears.

In 2012, she was invited by Eastwest Theatre Company to compose, arrange, and perform Sarajevo Red Line (Sarajevska Crvena Linija) in commemoration of the 20th anniversary of the Siege of Sarajevo. This piece, which incorporated traditional songs, pop songs, and classical music was performed on April 6, 2012 to an audience of 11, 541 empty red chairs lining the main boulevard in Sarajevo, with one chair for every life lost in the siege. Thousands of people from all walks of life congregated to witness and remember.

Her multimedia work The Sarajevo Haggadah: Music of the Book (for accordion, piano and video, 2014) traces the story of one of Jewish culture's most treasured manuscripts. Using the musical traditions of Spain, Italy, Austria, and Bosnia-Herzegovina, Ključo illustrates the Haggadah's travels from medieval Spain to 20th-century Bosnia where it was hidden and rescued during World War II, to its restoration by the National Museum in Sarajevo after the 1992-1995 war. Inspired by the historical novel People of the Book by Pulitzer-Prize winning author Geraldine Brooks, The Sarajevo Haggadah: Music of the Book interprets the artifact as a universal symbol of exile, return, and co-existence. The Sarajevo Haggadah performance was commissioned by the Foundation for Jewish Culture's New Jewish Culture Network, a league of North American performing arts presenters committed to the creation and touring of innovative projects, and developed in residence at Yellow Barn.

Her solo album Couperin Visiting the Balkans is published in 2015.

In 2016 director/actor Edvin Liverić and the Zagreb Youth Theater invited Ključo to compose music for The Notebook - a play based on Ágota Kristóf's book.

Her books Eastern European Folk Tunes for Accordion and Klezmer and Sephardic Tunes for Accordion are published by Schott Music.

Album Aritmia was published in 2016 as a result of her collaboration with guitarist Miroslav Tadić.

In addition, she has taught in conservatories and universities in Europe and in the U.S.

Ključo’s own accordion studies began at the Srednja Muzicka Skola in Sarajevo, continued at the Codarts University for the Arts in Rotterdam, and culminated at the University of the Arts Bremen, where she was granted a postgraduate scholarship for exceptional talent and graduated cum laude.
