= Class Enemy (play) =

1978 play by Nigel Williams

Class Enemy is a 1978 play by the British playwright Nigel Williams, which premiered at the Royal Court Theatre.

Class Enemy was written in 1978 as a social commentary on the apathy and anarchy in inner city British schools. The set is a bleak classroom with broken tables and chairs, dirty blackboard and lit with sterile fluorescent lamps. The play starts with six students waiting for a teacher and, like Samuel Beckett's Vladimir and Estragon, they seem to wait in vain. What the audience learns as the play unravels is that no one cares any more - at least not for these students. Instead, Iron commandeers the situation, forcing each student to 'teach' a lesson.

Phil Daniels played the role of Iron in the original 1978 Royal Court Theatre production. Daniel Day-Lewis played the role in the 1980 production at the Old Vic Theatre, Bristol.

== Bosnian adaptation ==
Class Enemy
- Class Enemy Poster by East West Theatre Company
- Original language: Bosnian
- Written by: Nigel Williams / Haris Pašović
- Characters: Iron (Pegla), Cobra (Kobra), Sky (Nebo), Chick (Koka), Kid (Klinjo), Kitty (Ma), Cat (Ca), Deputy Headmistress
- Subject: Balkan, high school, bullying, juvenile delinquency, violence
- Genre: A play
- Setting: Classroom in Bosnia and Herzegovina

Premiere
- Date: April 19, 2007
- Place: Sarajevo, Bosnia and Herzegovina
- www.eastwest.ba

The play was adapted (Klasni Neprijatelj in Bosnian language) by the East West Theatre Company from Sarajevo, Bosnia and Herzegovina. East West Theatre Company's production was adapted by the show's director, Haris Pašović. The original play, set in the South London classroom in early 1980s, was in Pašović's production transported to Sarajevo of 2007. The original cast consisting of six high-school boys was replaced by seven characters – three girls and four boys. The free adaptation, while keeping the original spirit and main themes, was also inspired by the research conducted in Bosnian classrooms.

The artistic team of the Class Enemy has conducted research in some of the secondary schools of Sarajevo and discovered alarming levels of violence among students and teachers. Findings, among other things included information that students often came to school carrying knives, that police were involved frequently, and that rude behavior during classes was a common occurrence. During just a few months, East West Theatre Company's team has recorded a number of cases of brutal violence in Sarajevo and small Bosnian towns which further informed many themes covered by the show.

The show has won a number of awards including No. 1 Pick of The Year by The Flying Inkpot from Singapore, Best Play Award at Singapore Arts Festival 2008, and Best Contemporary Show Award at International Theatre Festival Kontakt 2009 in Poland. It has also been performed at festivals in Edinburgh (Edinburgh International Festival), Singapore, Shanghai and Sibiu Romania, as well as theatres in Ljubljana Slovenia, Novi Sad Serbia and various small towns across Bosnia.

Nigel Williams' shocking 1970s play about a London school has been relocated to modern-day Sarajevo, making the pupils children of the war. This updating, by director Haris Pasovic, is subtle but important. Most obvious change is the switch from a single-sex boys' school to a mixed class of pubescent teenagers, none of whom - either male or female - can go for long without referring to masturbation or making lewd, often violent, approaches to one another. Implicit in the production is also the memory of the collapse of Yugoslavia. One student speaks about the poverty he has endured since his father's killing in the war, another about the social malaise that has attracted him to Islamic extremism, and a third about the racial abuse she has suffered as a result of being a Bosnian Serb living within Bosniak ethnic majority.

Cast and crew are from across the national spectrum: Serbs, Bosniaks, Croats, all full of disturbing stories of the war. The play's themes of confused social values, isolation, single-parent families, alcoholism, xenophobia and violence were a strong fit, although Pasovic tweaked cultural references somewhat and adjusted dialogue to make it more accessible to a Bosnian audience.

=== Bosnian version Original Cast ===
Actor	Role
Amar Selimovic	Iron (Pegla)
Zana Marjanovic / Maja Zeco	Cobra (Kobra)
Maja Izetbegovic	Sky (Nebo)
Irma Alimanovic	Chick (Koka)
Nusmir Muharemovic	Kid (Klinjo)
Samir Karic	Kitty (Ma)
Amir Muminovic	Cat (Ca)
Lidija Stevanovic	Deputy Headmistress

== See also ==
- de:Klassen Feind, a German theatre (1981) and film (1983) adaption of Class Enemy by Peter Stein
