= Napoli Teatro Festival Italia =

Annual theatre festival in Naples, Italy

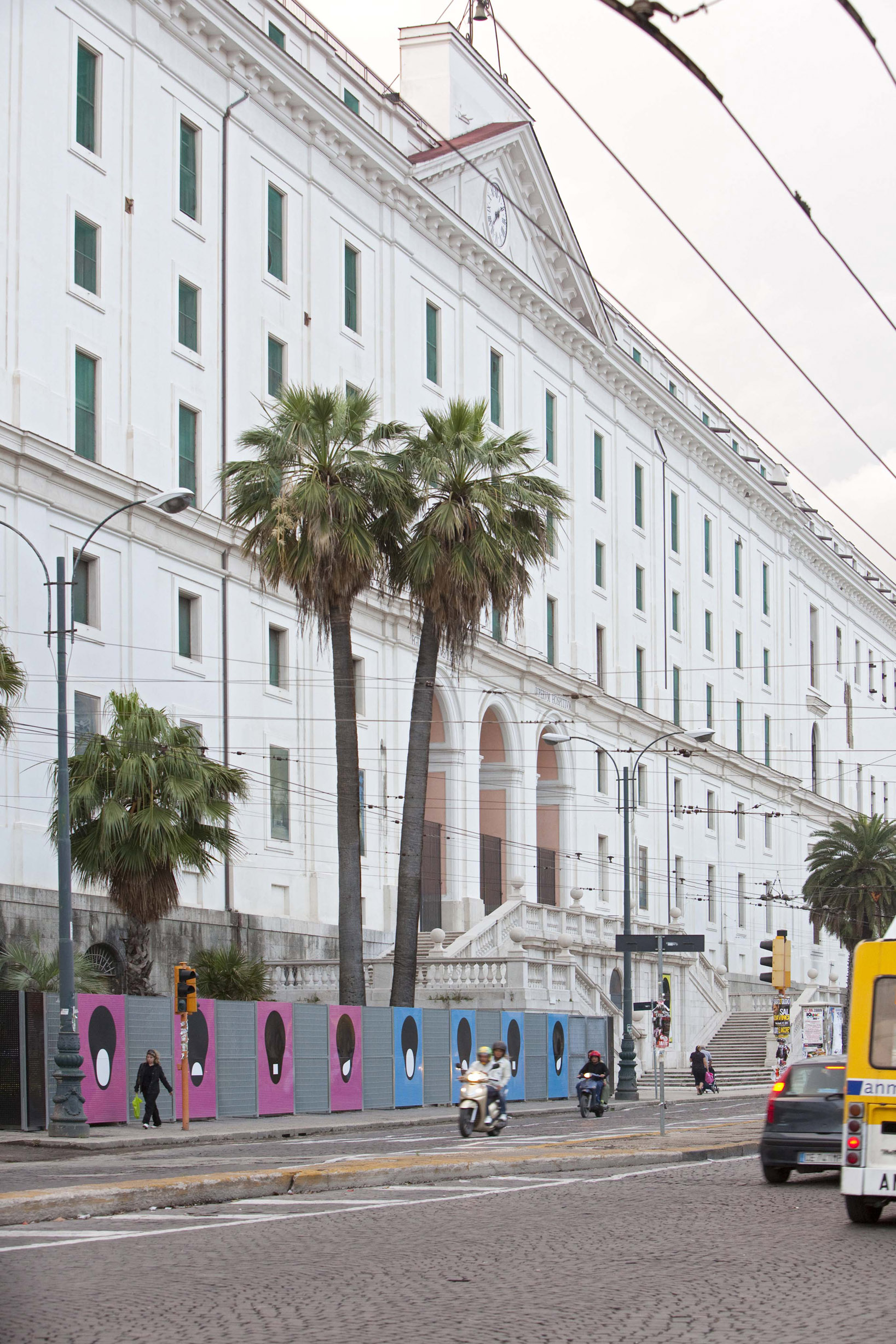
The Bourbon Hospice for the Poor during the Napoli Teatro Festival Italia

The Napoli Teatro Festival Italia is an international festival which takes place every year during the month of June in Naples, Italy. The Festival's organization selects, produces and commissions plays, exhibitions and artistic performances, involving artists from all over the world for the elaboration and representation of international and multicultural creations. Along with the artistic activities, the Festival also offers the possibility of creating new planning and production partnerships with national and international institutions, it promotes training courses and enhances historical monuments, which are used as the plays' locations. Moreover, the Festival promotes and produces the European Theatre Company, the first company whose members are professional actors from the European Union.

== History ==
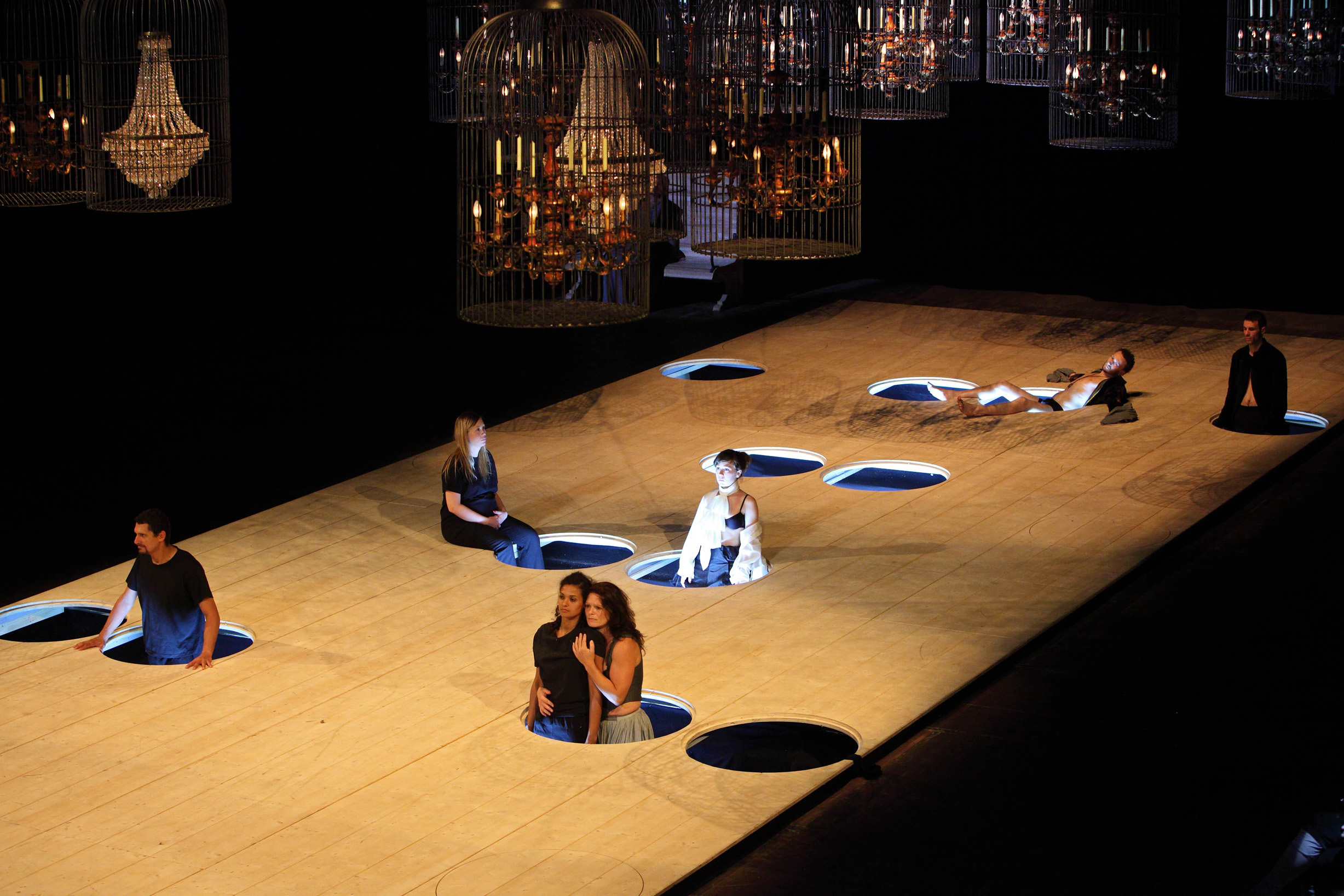
Trilogia della Villeggiatura by Carlo Goldoni adaptation Letizia Russo, Antonio Latella directed by Antonio Latella production Schauspiel Koln

In 2006 the Ministry of Cultural Heritage and Activities published a project announcement with the idea of realizing an International theatre festival that could compare with established European models such as The Edinburgh International Festival and the Festival d'Avignon. Many Italian cities with great performing tradition such as Milan, Venice and Genoa participated, but in the end the city of Naples was chosen. In August 2007, the Region of Campania created the Campania Festival Foundation, with Rachele Furfaro as the chairman, with the aim of realizing the project of the first theatrical festival in Naples. Renato Quaglia, who had been the organizing director of the Venice Biennale was chosen as the artistic and organizing director.

== Editions ==
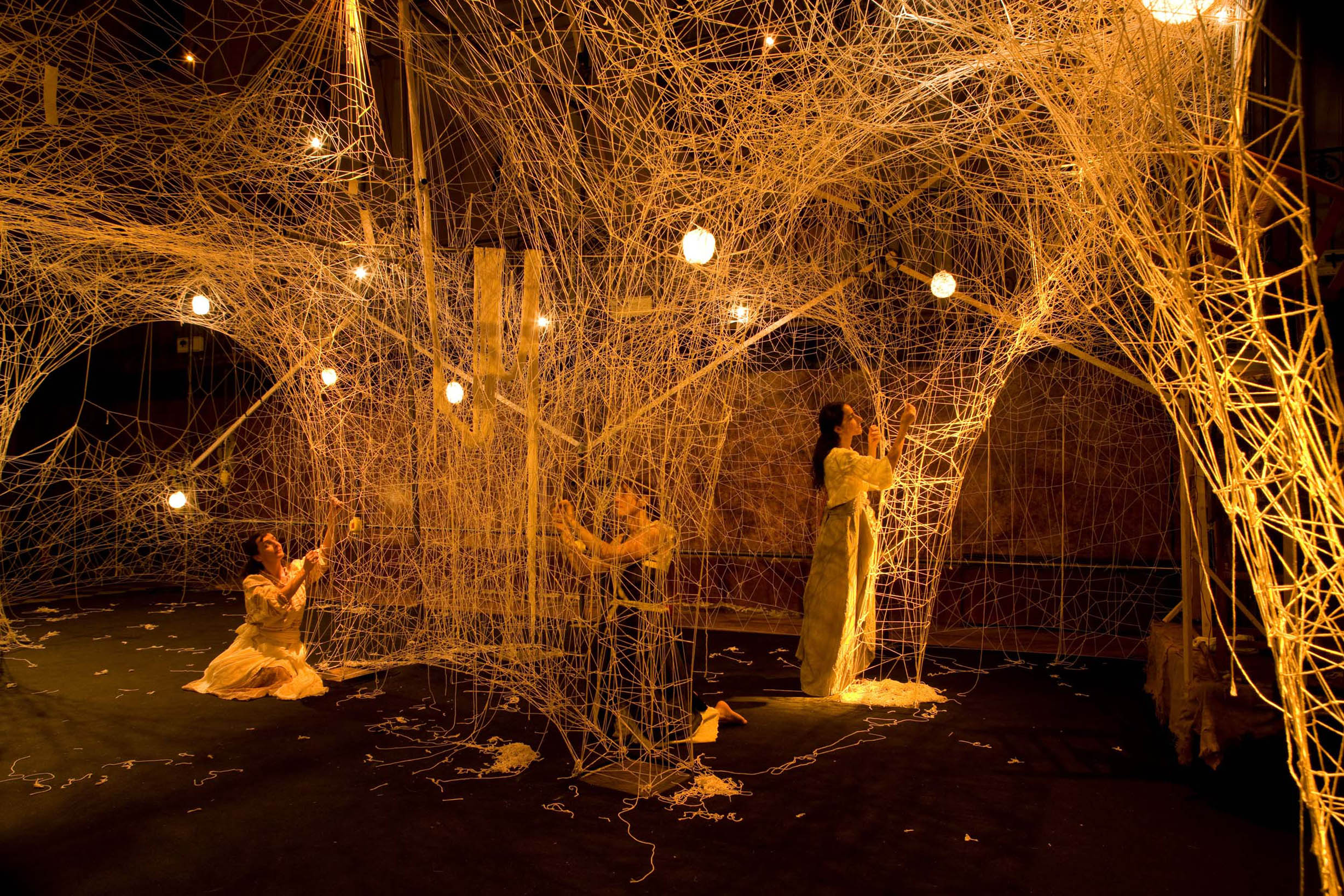
Cosa deve fare Napoli per rimanere in equilibrio sopra un uovo, by Enrique Vargas - directed by Enrique Vargas

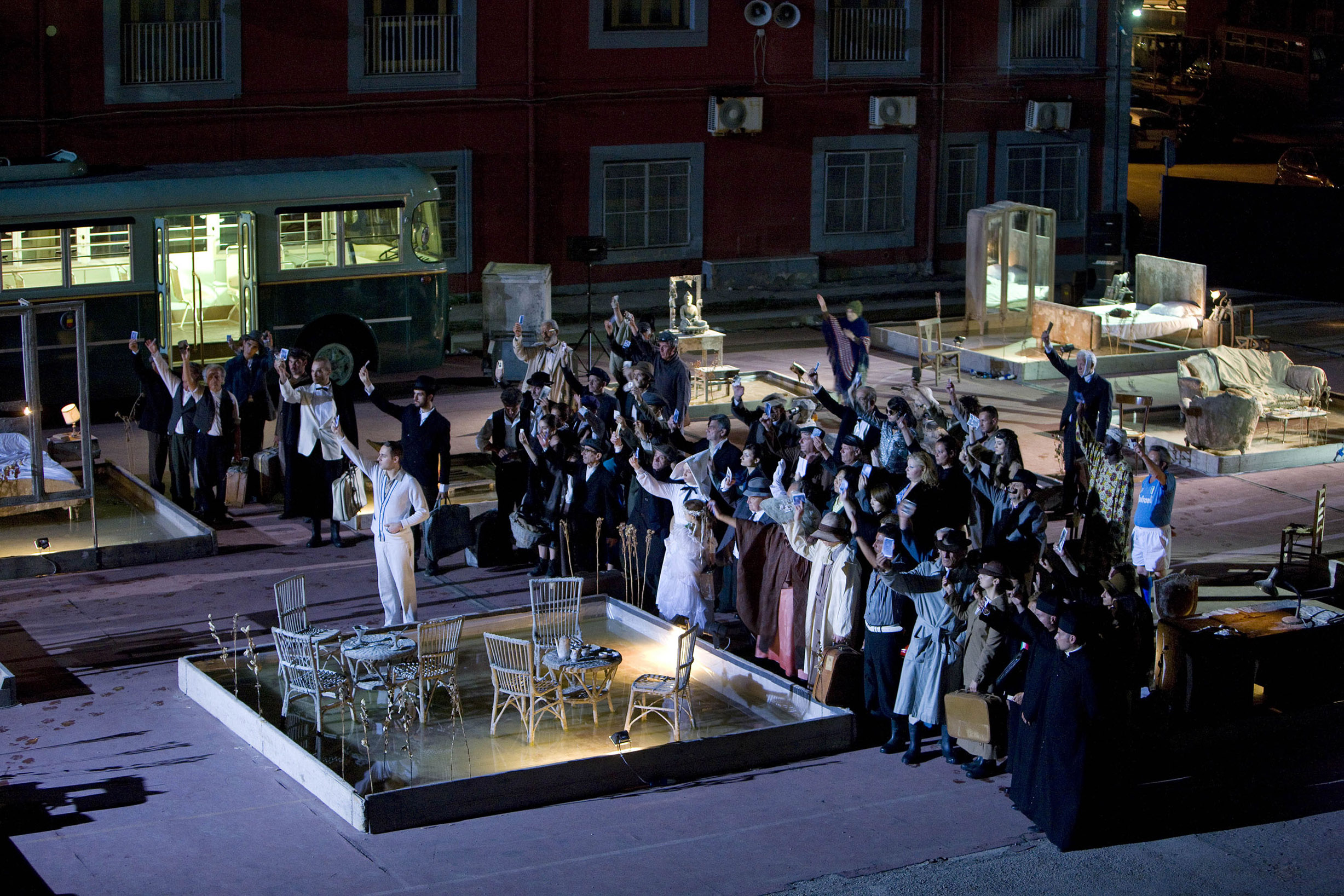
Proprio come se nulla fosse avvenuto. staged in Darsena Acton, Naples - by Roberto Andò

More than 2000 artists from 17 countries have been involved in the first edition, in June 2008. The original works, created expressively for the Festival, were 17 out of 40 total debuts. The second edition of the Festival, in June 2009, was enriched with the institution of the “Over the seas Festival” (in collaboration with the San Carlo Theatre) and of the Fringe Festival. Eighty-three plays were performed with the support of artists from 24 countries and more than 70.000 people in the audience.

== Locations ==
The Napoli Teatro Festival Italia is an event that covers all the metropolitan area of the city of Naples: beside many local theatres (San Carlo Theatre, Bellini Theatre, Mercadante – Teatro Stabile of Naples, etc.), the plays are also organized in nontheatrical structures, such as the Bourbon Hospice for the Poor, which is now one of the locations of the Festival, and other stages which are occasionally chosen for the shows, such as the Darsena Acton, the roof of the Arts Academy of Naples, the Undergrounds of the city, churches and monuments.

== E45 Naples Fringe Festival ==
In 2009 the Festival promoted the creation of the E54 Naples Fringe Festival, the "off" festival that promotes emerging authors and artists. The Naples Fringe Festival was named after road E45, the one that connects Karesuvanto (Finland), to Gela (Sicily), passing through Naples. The first edition of the E45 has brought on stage 27 shows, chosen from a very wide selection, in several theatres of the city. Two of the plays were chosen for the 2010 official edition of the Festival. The 2010 edition of the E45 Naples Fringe Festival will present 39 plays selected among more than 250 of the presented projects.

== European Theatre Company ==
The European Theatre Company was created in 2008, promoted by the Napoli Teatro Festival Italia, as a work project on languages, multicultural issues and blending of different theatrical traditions. It is not a stabile company, but an ensemble of actors from different European countries, who all act in their own language. Every year the project is committed to a different director and it is aimed to the production of a play which is promoted by the Napoli Teatro Festival Italia. In 2008 the company, entrusted to Virginio Liberti and Annaliso Bianco, brought on stage a representation of The Trojan Women. In 2009 it was entrusted to David Lescot, who wrote and directed the play L’Européenne, which was produced in collaboration with the Théâtre de la Ville theatre in Paris. For the 2010 edition, the English director Alexander Zeldin will bring on stage Romeo and Juliet, produced in collaboration with the Théâtre de la Ville theatre in Paris, the National Theatre Studio in London and the Teatro Stabile in Naples, involving Italian and English artists along with second generation citizens, belonging to communities that have been in Italy for many years.

== Environmental commitment ==
The Napoli Teatro Festival Italia has reached the highest standards in eco-compatibility: from the first edition the Festival has obtained the certification requested based on ISO 14001 (environmental management systems) and EMAS (community system of eco-management). The Festival's sustainable ecological management has been guaranteed by monitoring the environmental impact of its activities, from the functioning of its offices to the production of the set designs, from the construction sites to the transportation, the use of electric power and other polluting factors. Moreover, part of the Festival's electrical needs are covered by the use of solar power, produced in a photovoltaic plant currently under construction.
