= Bosnian National Theatre Zenica =

National theatre in Bosnia and Herzegovina

- Interactive map of Bosnian National Theatre Zenica
- Address: Trg Bosne i Hercegovine 3 72000; Zenica; Bosnia and Herzegovina

Construction
- Opened: 1950
- Architects: Jahiel Finci; Zlatko Ugljen

Website
- www.bnp.ba

Bosnian National Theatre Zenica is a theater institution founded in 1950 in Zenica, Bosnia and Herzegovina. It has produced more than 10,000 performances, including about 650 premieres.

Bosnian National Theatre is located in a building in the business part of Zenica. The building was designed by the noted architects Jahiel Finci and Zlatko Ugljen. Moving from the old to the new building in 1978 was one of the more significant events in the history of the theater. The development of the theater was strongly advanced by moving to the new building which offered great technical possibilities.
