= Maribor Slovene National Theatre =

Theatre in Maribor, northeastern Slovenia

Coordinates: 46°33′35.04″N 15°38′39.03″E

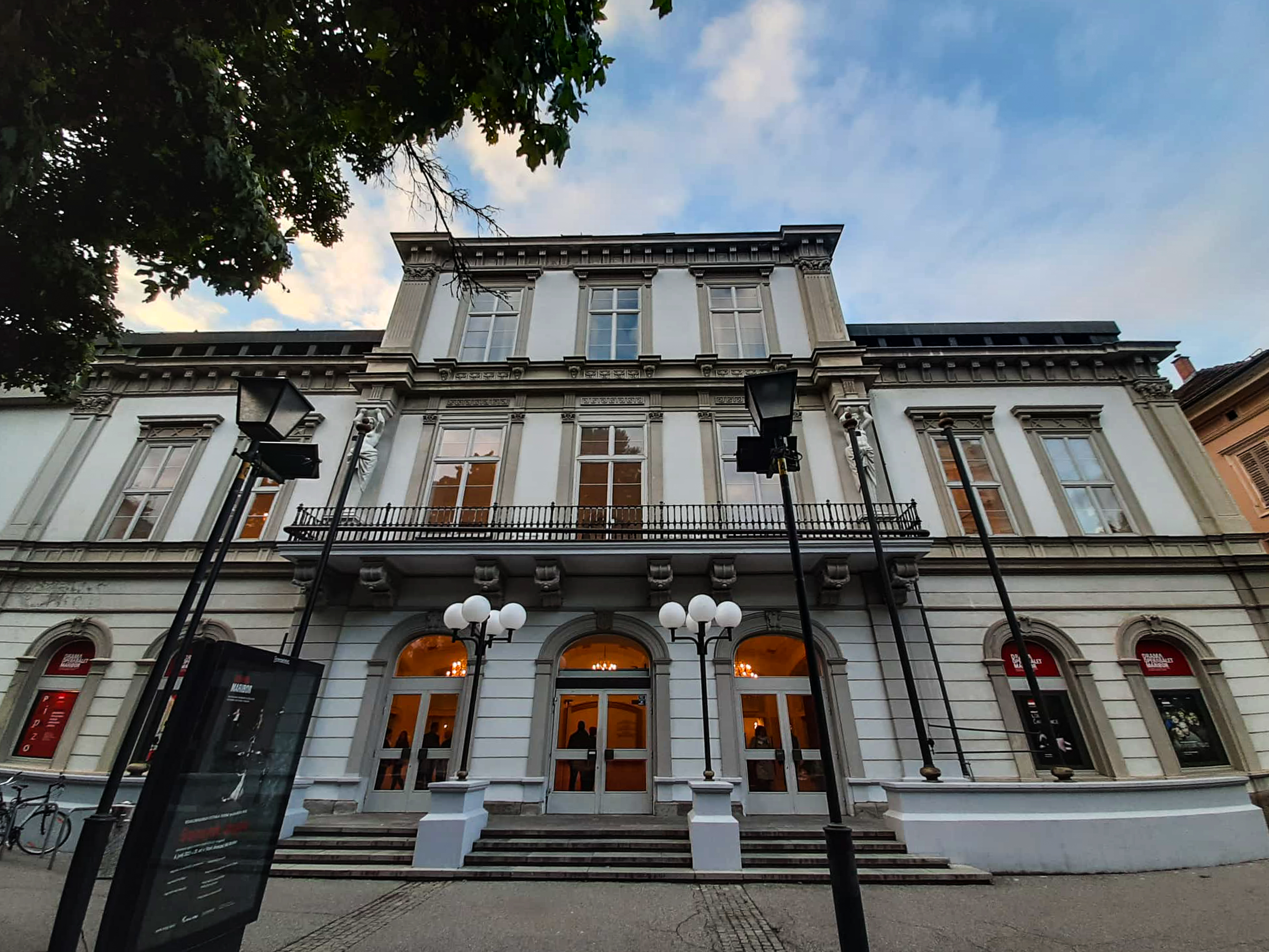
Headquarters of the Maribor Slovene National Theatre

The Maribor Slovene National Theatre (SNG Maribor) is a theatre in Maribor, northeastern Slovenia. Its performances of drama, opera, and ballet annually attract the country's largest theatrical audiences.

== Performances ==
The theatre regularly hosts the Ljubljana Slovene National Theatre Opera and Ballet. In January 2012 performances of Marij Kogoj's opera Black Masks were scheduled.

== See also ==
- Ljubljana Slovene National Theatre Drama, Ljubljana
- Ljubljana Slovene National Theatre Opera and Ballet, Ljubljana
- Nova Gorica Slovene National Theatre
