= Haris Pašović =

Bosnian theatre director (born 1961)

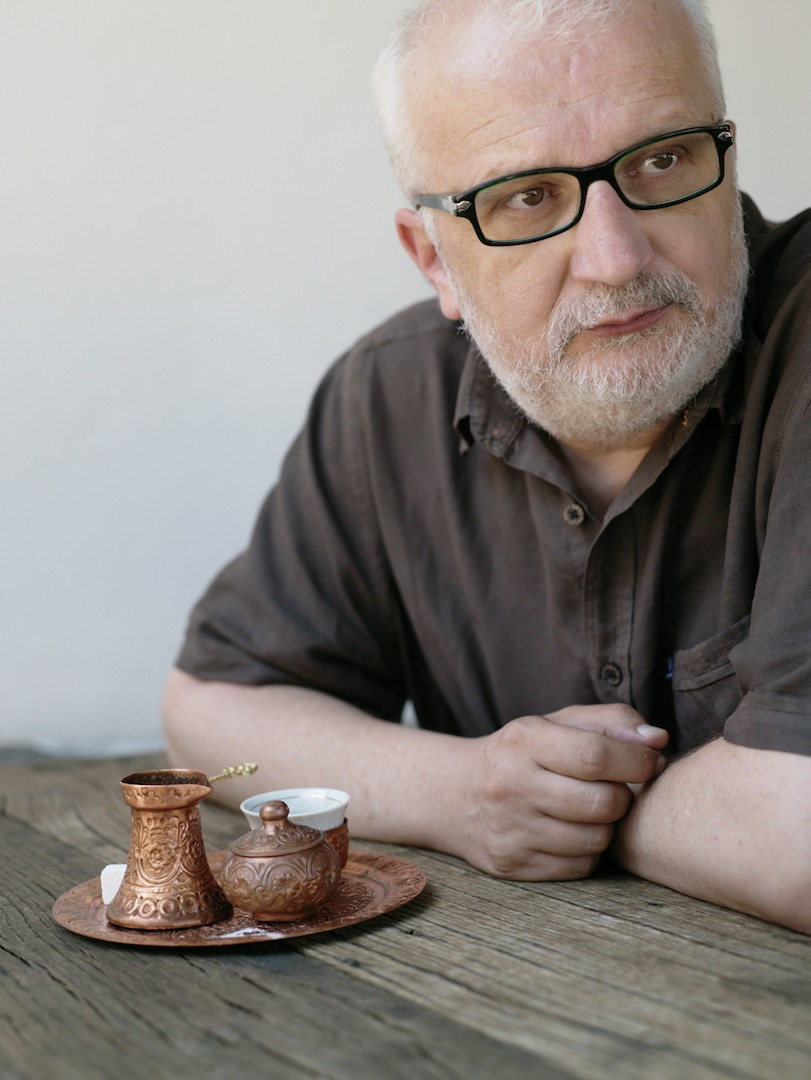
- Born: 16 July 1961 (age 65); Sarajevo, SR Bosnia and Herzegovina, Yugoslavia
- Occupation: Director
- Years active: 1980–present

Haris Pašović (born 16 July 1961) is a Bosnian theatre director. Over the course of his career, he has also worked as a playwright, producer, choreographer, performer, and designer. He is best known for his productions of Wedekind's “Spring Awakening”. He is the artistic leader of the East West Theatre Company in Sarajevo and tenured Professor of Directing at the Academy of Performing Arts in Sarajevo.

== Life and career ==
Pašović was born in Sarajevo, Bosnia and Herzegovina in 1961. His education includes the Academy of Performing Arts in Novi Sad, former Yugoslavia; the Fulbright Scholarship in the USA (University of Hawaii, Honolulu, New York University and the University of Wisconsin, Madison); the UNESCO High Levels for Directors, Festival d’Avignon, France, and other professional trainings.

He directed in some of the most significant theatres in the former Yugoslavia and participated in a number of festivals worldwide. His productions of Frank Wedekind's Spring Awakening and Calling the Birds based on Aristophanes’ play The Birds (both at the Yugoslav Drama Theatre, Belgrade 1987/90) have been considered as the landmarks in the theatre of the former Yugoslavia. Likewise, Samuel Beckett's Waiting for Godot (Belgrade Drama Theatre) and Alfred Jarry’s Ubu Roi (National Theatre Subotica) have been considered as the classic productions in the ex-Yugoslav theatre, the former being the last Yugoslav premiere performed on the eve of the war in the country. As the artistic leader of theatre Promena (“Change”), Pašović directed with a great success Wiess's Marat/Sade; Wedensky's The Christmas Three at the Ivanovs; Kis's Simon the Magus on a lake surrounded by sand desert; Buñuel's Hamlet placed in the fortress sitting on a rock rising from the Adriatic Sea (Dubrovnik Summer Festival) and many other plays.

Haris Pašović, director of East West Theatre Company

During the siege of Sarajevo (1992–96) Pašović spent most of the time in Sarajevo managing the MES International Theatre Festival. He directed plays and produced several shows, among others Waiting for Godot, directed by Susan Sontag. In 1993, while Sarajevo was still under the siege, he also organized the first Sarajevo Film Festival “Beyond the End of the World” and was one of the most prominent advocates of naming a square in Sarajevo after Susan Sontag. Pašović even managed to tour in 1994 to several European countries (under UNESCO auspices) with the Sarajevo Festival Ensemble invited by Peter Brook and Théâtre des Bouffes du Nord. During the tour, the Ensemble performed two productions he had directed in the besieged city: Silk Drums based on the Noh plays, and In the Country of Last Things, based on Paul Auster's novel.

After the war, Pašović directed several documentaries including Greta, a story on Prof. Greta Ferusic who survived both Auschwitz and the siege of Sarajevo; a documentary trilogy entitled Home, Love Thy Neighbor and The Balkans – Blood and Honey about the American journalists David Rieff, Peter Maass and Ron Haviv, who had reported from the Bosnian War and an art documentary entitled A Propos de Sarajevo about the Sarajevo International Jazz Festival.

In 2002, Pašović directed Shakespeare's “Romeo and Juliet” in front of the Parliament of Bosnia and Herzegovina in downtown Sarajevo. This was a futuristic production about a Muslim Romeo and a Christian Juliet, which involved 25 actors and live musicians, 1000 sq. m of stage, a 60-member crew, arms, vehicles, fireworks, video projections across the façade of the Parliament building and stopped the traffic in the main city artery for four hours each night it was performed.

In 2005, Pašović established the East West Theatre Company and directed a number of shows. Pašović also writes the plays. He wrote Rebellion at the National Theatre, Ulysses, Silk Drums, Bolero, Sarajevo and Football, Football. He also adapted several texts including Alfred Jarry’s Ubu Roi, Aristophanes' The Birds, Miroslav Krleža's Europe Today, Nigel Williams' Class Enemy” and several others. He writes essays and articles.

Pašović gave a number of workshops and master-classes for directors and actors, as well as public lectures (Tyrone Guthrie Centre; National Theatre of Scotland/Edinburgh International Festival; Queen's University, Belfast; Drama Centre Singapore; Festival Desire Subotica, Serbia, etc.).

He is a co-founder of the Directing Department at the Performing Arts Academy in Sarajevo. Several of his students are today internationally acclaimed film directors (such as Academy Award-winning Danis Tanović and Golden Bear-winning Jasmila Žbanić). Pašović lives in Sarajevo. He teaches Directing at Academy of Performing Arts in Sarajevo and Arts and Leadership at the Bled School of Management, Slovenia.

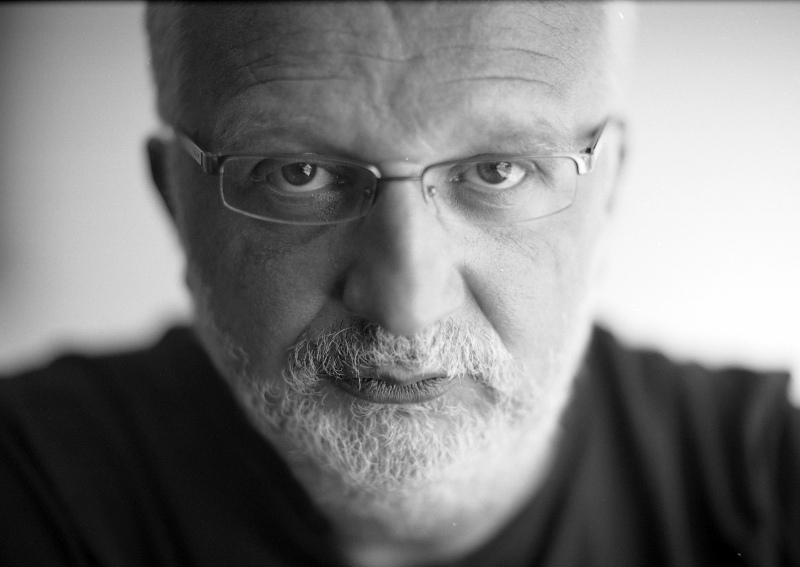
Haris Pašović

Haris Pašović is the main initiator of a large-scale event called Sarajevo Red Line which in April 2012 commemorated the Siege of Sarajevo's 20th anniversary. This drama and music poem dedicated to Sarajevo citizens killed during the 1992–96 Bosnian War consisted of 11,541 red chairs placed on the main Sarajevo street and it included a street exhibition and a concert. The event received a big international coverage in the media and was broadcast live in a number of TV stations.

== Works ==
- Buñuel's Hamlet, 1984
- Marat/Sad, TV drama, TV Novi Sad (adapted and directed by), 1985
- Paradise, now!, TV drama, TV Novi Sad (screenplay adaptation and directed by), 1985
- Frank Wedekind's Spring’s Awakening, 1987
- Calling the Birds (based on Aristophanes’ play “The Birds”), 1989
- Samuel Beckett's Waiting for Godot
- Ubu Roi (based on Alfred Jarry's play)
- Wiess’ Marat/Sade
- Wedensky's The Christmas Three at the Ivanovs’
- Kis’ Simon the Magus
- Silk Drums (based on the Noh plays), 1994
- In the Country of Last Things (based on Paul Auster's novel), 1994
- Greta ”, feature documentary (director and producer), 1997
- Iz Albanije, documentary (screenwriter and director), 1998
- Home, a documentary trilogy, 1999/2000
- Love Thy Neighbor, a documentary trilogy, 1999/2000
- The Balkans – Blood and Honey, a documentary trilogy, 1999/2000
- Shakespeare’s Romeo and Juliet, 2002
- À propos de Sarajevo, documentary (screenwriter, director and producer), 2003
- Rebellion at the National Theatre (inspired by McCoy’s novel “They Shoot the Horses, Don’t They?”), playwright and director, 2004
- Ulysses (playwright)
- Bolero, Sarajevo
- Hamlet by William Shakespeare (director), 2005
- Victor or the Children Take Over, 2006
- Faust (adapted and directed by), 2006
- Class Enemy based on Nigel Williams’ play (adapted and directed by), 2008
- Nora (Henrik Ibsen's Doll's House), 2009
- Football, Football, 2010
- Europe Today, 2011
- Sarajevo Red Line, 2012
- The Conquest of Happiness, new work theatre production, 2013

== Awards ==
- BITEF award for the Best Director
- ‘’Bojan Stupica’’ award for Best Director in the former Yugoslavia
- Best Director Award at the MES International Theatre Festival
- UCHIMURA Prize
- The Best Director at the Festival of Bosnian Theatres
