= Bojan Hadzihalilovic =

- Born: 6 June 1964 (age 62); Sarajevo, Bosnia and Herzegovina
- Occupation: Graphic designer
- Years active: 1984–present

Bojan Hadzihalilovic (born 6 June 1964) is a Sarajevo-based graphic designer and creative director of a Bosnia and Herzegovina design company called Fabrika.

== Career ==
He graduated from the Sarajevo Academy of Fine Arts in 1989 and with his colleague Lejla Mulabegovic formed the designer group called TRIO Sarajevo in 1989. From its founding until April 1992, they have designed some 50 important projects, including record covers of some of the most popular rock bands from Bosnia and Herzegovina, numerous design projects at many festivals in the former Yugoslavia, design of books, newspapers and film posters. For their pre-Bosnian war work they have been awarded by Saatchi & Saatchi. They have also taken part in numerous exhibits in the country and abroad (Moscow, Berlin and Sarajevo).

During the siege of Sarajevo Bojan remained in the city. With TRIO Bojan designed a serial of propaganda posters "The Aggression Against Bosnia" and designed the uniforms for all Bosnian athletes who competed at the Summer Olympics in Barcelona in 1992.

Bojan currently works as a creative director of a marketing agency called Fabrika and often collaborates with East West Theatre Company for which he designed a large number of posters.
