= Sarajevo Process =

The Sarajevo Process (Serbo-Croatian: Sarajevski proces) was a 1983 trial against 13 Muslim intellectuals accused of Islamic fundamentalism. Arrests were made on 23 March 1983, trials held in from 18 July until 20 August 1983. The accused were members of the Young Muslims (Mladi muslimani). Among these were Alija Izetbegović, the author of the essay Islamic Declaration (1970) and later leader of the Party of Democratic Action (SDA) active during the breakup of Yugoslavia, and the first President of Bosnia and Herzegovina. All were sentenced to prison, and were pardoned on 25 November 1988.

- Omer Behmen, 15 years
- Salih Behmen, 5 years
- Đula Bičakčić
- Edhem Bičakčić, 7 years
- Hasan Čengić, 10 years
- Derviš Đurđević
- Alija Izetbegović, 14 years
- Džemaludin Latić, 6.5 years
- Ismet Kasumagić, 10 years
- Melika Salihbegović
- Mustafa Spahić, 5 years
- Husein Živalj, 6 years
