= Death and state funeral of Alija Izetbegović =

2003 funeral of Alija Izetbegović

Funeral of Alija Izetbegović
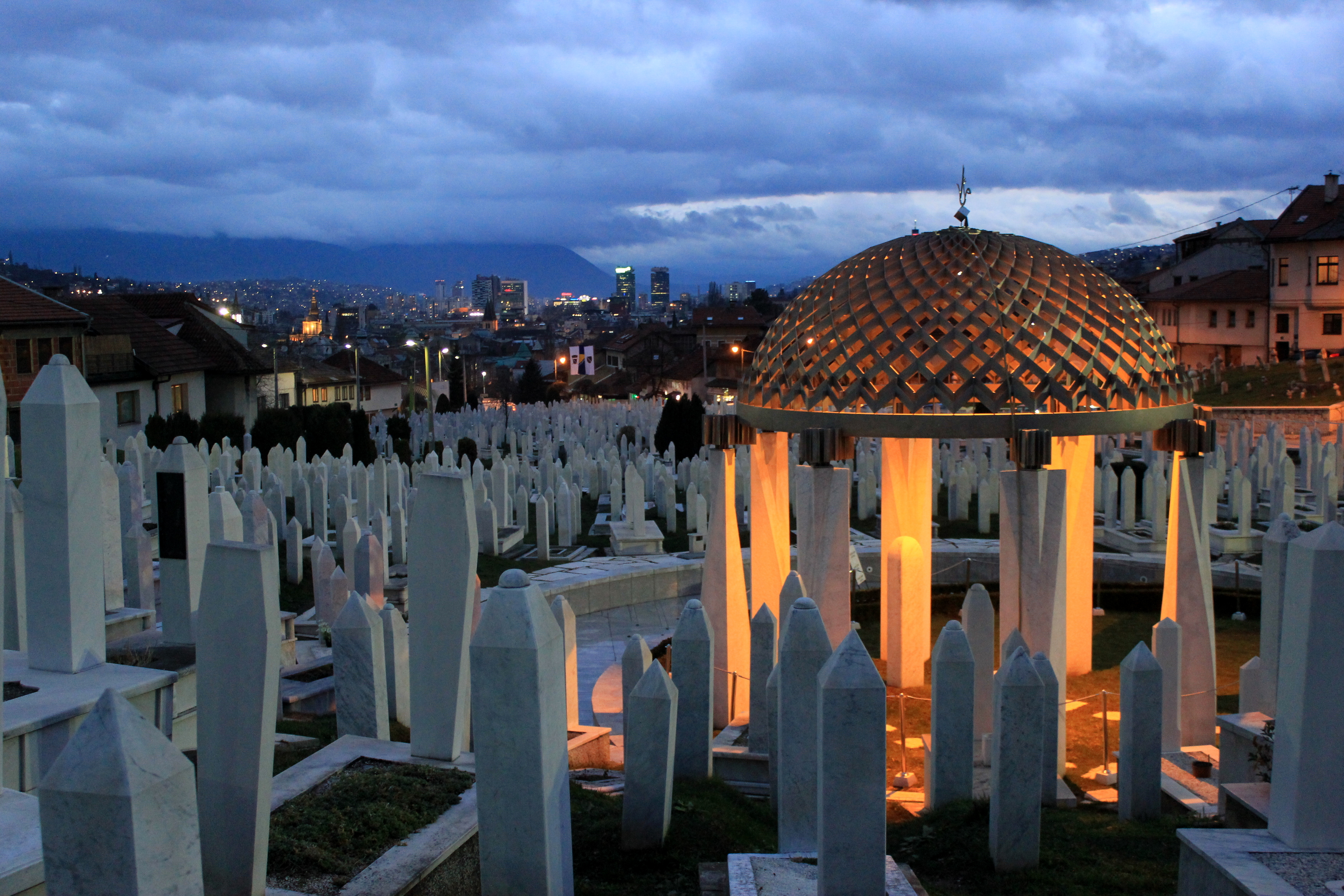
- Izetbegović's grave in Sarajevo
- Date: 22 October 2003
- Location: Sarajevo, Bosnia and Herzegovina
- Participants: Bosnian officials and dignitaries from 44 foreign countries

On 19 October 2003, Alija Izetbegović, the first president and later chairman of the Presidency of Bosnia and Herzegovina, died in Sarajevo, Bosnia and Herzegovina. His funeral, held three days later on 22 October, drew many Bosnian officials, dignitaries from 44 foreign countries, 105 members of the Grand National Assembly of Turkey and between 100,000 and 150,000 people, with his family receiving over 4,000 telegrams. Over 400 journalists attended the funeral as it was broadcast live on TV with 37 cameras.

== Background ==
In the years following the 1992–95 Bosnian War, Izetbegović's health started to deteriorate. He stepped down from his post as member of the Presidency of Bosnia and Herzegovina in October 2000 at the age of 74, citing poor health. He would then resign as the Party of Democratic Action's leader in October 2001. On 19 October 2003, Izetbegović died in Sarajevo at the age of 78 in hospice due to heart disease, which was complicated by injuries suffered from a fall at home. An ICTY investigation of Izetbegović was in progress, but it had ended upon his death.

== Reactions ==
Following Izetbegović's death, many world leaders offered their condolences, including former US president Bill Clinton, French president Jacques Chirac, Council of the European Union secretary-general Javier Solana, United Nations secretary-general Kofi Annan, Italian president Carlo Azeglio Ciampi, NATO secretary-general George Robertson, Turkish prime minister Recep Tayyip Erdoğan, Croatian president Stjepan Mesić and prime minister Ivica Račan and many others.

Today, it seems appropriate for the sky to cry over Bosnia as well.

— High Representative for Bosnia and Herzegovina Paddy Ashdown said in his speech at Izetbegović's funeral during rainfall.

== Aftermath ==
There were initiatives to rename a part of the main street of Sarajevo from Marshal Tito street and the Sarajevo International Airport in his honor, but after politicians from Republika Srpska, the international community, and UN envoy Paddy Ashdown objected to these initiatives, they both failed.

On 11 August 2006, Izetbegović's grave at the Kovači cemetery in Sarajevo was badly damaged by a bomb. The identity of the bomber or bombers has never been determined.
