= Jurislav Korenić =

Yugoslav theatre and television director

- Born: 12 November 1915; Zagreb, Austria-Hungary
- Died: 1 March 1974 (aged 58); Sarajevo, SFR Yugoslavia
- Resting place: Bare Cemetery, Sarajevo, Bosnia and Herzegovina
- Education: University of Zagreb
- Occupations: Theatre director, television director, art critic, playwright, screenwriter, classical musician
- Years active: 1939–1974
- Spouse: Desa Korenić

Jurislav Korenić (Zagreb, October 12, 1915 – Sarajevo, March 1, 1974) was a Yugoslav theater and television director, classical musician, theorist, art critic and playwright. He founded the Chamber Theater 55 and the MESS Festival, of which he was the director. He is one of the founders of the Bosnian National Theater in Zenica. He was engaged in political theater and cabaret and was the first to direct a musical in Bosnia and Herzegovina, as well as the first to stage the works of Bertolt Brecht. He modernized the Sarajevo Opera and directed the most performed play in the history of Bosnian theatre - Ljubav. He is one of the most deserving Croats in Bosnia and Herzegovina for theater art and culture and co-authored one of the most popular Bosnian television series of all time, Karađoz.

== Biography ==
Korenić was born in Zagreb, then part of the Austro-Hungarian Empire where he graduated from a music conservatory. After that, he worked as a professional musician, playing the double bass and piano in various salon orchestras. At the start of the Second World War, he was working at the Croatian National Theatre as an inspector and prompter. Later he was an accompanist and assistant director. At the end of the war, he completed his directing studies at the acclaimed Academy of Dramatic Art in Zagreb. Soon after he changed theater house and city, moving to Rijeka where he worked at the Ivan Zajc Croatian National Theatre as secretary, accompanist, director, and manager of the opera ensemble. In 1952, his friend Boris Papandopulo invited him to Sarajevo, which he accepted. He became the director of the National Opera. Within a year, he received another academic diploma with the staging of Nikola Šubić Zrinski, in front of the examination committee chaired by the Croatian theater actor Branko Gavella. This made Korenić the first opera director in Sarajevo to have an academic degree. Even then, he received praise from theater critics, who praised his staging of this Zajc opera as immeasurably better than many of the previous ones.

In 1955, he founded Malo kazalište ("Little Theatre"), which was then the first chamber theater in Bosnia and Herzegovina and the whole of Yugoslavia at the time. It became today's Chamber Theater 55.

In 1960, he started the festival of Small Stages of Yugoslavia (MESS). In 1967, he again breathed new life into the Sarajevo theater, which was then in an artistic crisis. He co-founded the Drama Studio, which 5 years later grew into the Department of Performing Arts and Theatrology at the Faculty of Humanities, University of Sarajevo.

He held the position of director of the Little Theater until 1966. When the Sarajevo Puppet Theater lost its director and founder, Adolfo Pomezni, in 1966, Korenić became the director. He had a new stage built (today's Sarajevo Youth Theatre), and he gave the actors-puppeteers freedom of expression, accepting all ideas and asking the actors to explore the possibilities of expressing their puppets, which was testified by Ante Hrkač, one of Sarajevo's greatest actors-puppeteers.

Together with the actor Reihan Demirdžić, he started the shadow theater Karađoz-pozorište in Sarajevo, for which he wrote drama templates and directed plays, and later, based on adapted texts, the television series Karađoz was filmed by RTV Sarajevo.

In the last years of his life, he worked as a dramaturg at the Sarajevo National Theater. He died on 1 March 1974 in Sarajevo.

== Notable works ==
- Massenet's Werther, 1950
- Gounod's Faust, 1951
- Leoncavallo's Pagliacci, 1952
- Verdi's La traviata, 1953
- Shakespeare's Othello, 1958
- Kafka's The Trial, 1959
- Bizet's Carmen, 1961
- Shakespeare's Romeo and Juliet, 1963
- Shaw's Pygmalion, 1966
- Brecht's Rise and Fall of the City of Mahagonny, 1968
- Januszewska's Tigriček, 1972

== Awards ==
- Zagreb City Assembly Award for culture, 1957
- Sixth of April Sarajevo Award, 1959
- Mess Festival Lifetime Achievement Award, 1966
- Yugoslav Drama Theatre Lifetime Achievement Award, 1969

== Memorials ==
- In 2018 the main square in front of the Sarajevo Youth Theatre was named after him.
- In 2016 the Chamber Theater 55 established the Days of Jurislav Korenić festival in his honour.
