= Kulovića Street =

Street in Sarajevo, Bosnia and Herzegovina

- Native name: Kulovića ulica (Bosnian)
- Namesake: Sulejman Ruždija Kulović
- Location: Sarajevo, Bosnia and Herzegovina
- Postal code: 71000
- Coordinates: 43°51′32.44″N 18°25′31.89″E
- North end: Obala Kulina bana
- South end: Marshal Tito Street

Other
- Known for: Central location, historical significance, proximity to cultural institutions

Kulovića Street (Bosnian: Kulovića ulica; Serbo-Croatian Cyrillic: Куловића улица) is a notable thoroughfare in the city center of Sarajevo, the capital of Bosnia and Herzegovina. It runs in a north–south direction, connecting Obala Kulina bana with Marshal Tito Street, and intersects with Branilaca Sarajeva Street. The street lies in close proximity to landmarks such as the Sarajevo National Theatre and the Sarajevo Youth Theatre.

== History ==
Kulovića Street dates back to the Ottoman period, but received its current name in 1885 in honor of Sulejman Ruždija Kulović, a prominent Sarajevo judge and philanthropist. He financed the construction of a public fountain near Kalin Hadži Alija’s Mosque, which was later demolished in 1947.

== Siege of Sarajevo ==
During the Siege of Sarajevo (1992–1996), the street was part of the so-called Sniper Alley, where civilians were frequently targeted by snipers positioned in the surrounding hills and buildings. To protect pedestrians, concrete slabs and makeshift barriers were installed.

One such concrete slab near Kulovića Street bore the graffiti "Pink Floyd," referencing the British rock band’s album The Wall. The slab became symbolic of the city's defense and artistic resistance. Although it was removed during a ceasefire in 1994, sniper attacks resumed afterward and the slab was never reinstated.

== Notable buildings ==
- Sarajevo Youth Theatre: Situated on Kulovića Street, this theater was formed in 1977 by merging the Pionir and Muppet Theatres. It remained active during the war, serving as a venue for cultural resistance.
- Hotel Bosnia: Is a historic hotel located in the heart of Sarajevo, Bosnia and Herzegovina. Situated in Kulovića Street, the hotel offers comfortable accommodation with modern amenities. Originally built in the Yugoslav era and renovated several times since.

== Transportation ==
Kulovića Street is served by various public transport options. Nearby tram stops include Banka and Čobanija, while Dom Armije and Pošta are accessible bus stops. Tram lines 1 and 3, as well as bus line 103, pass through or near the area.

== See also ==
- Marshal Tito Street
- Sarajevo Youth Theatre
- Sniper Alley
