= Landesbank für Bosnien und Herzegowina =

Former bank in Sarajevo

Bank of the Lands of Bosnia and Herzegovina
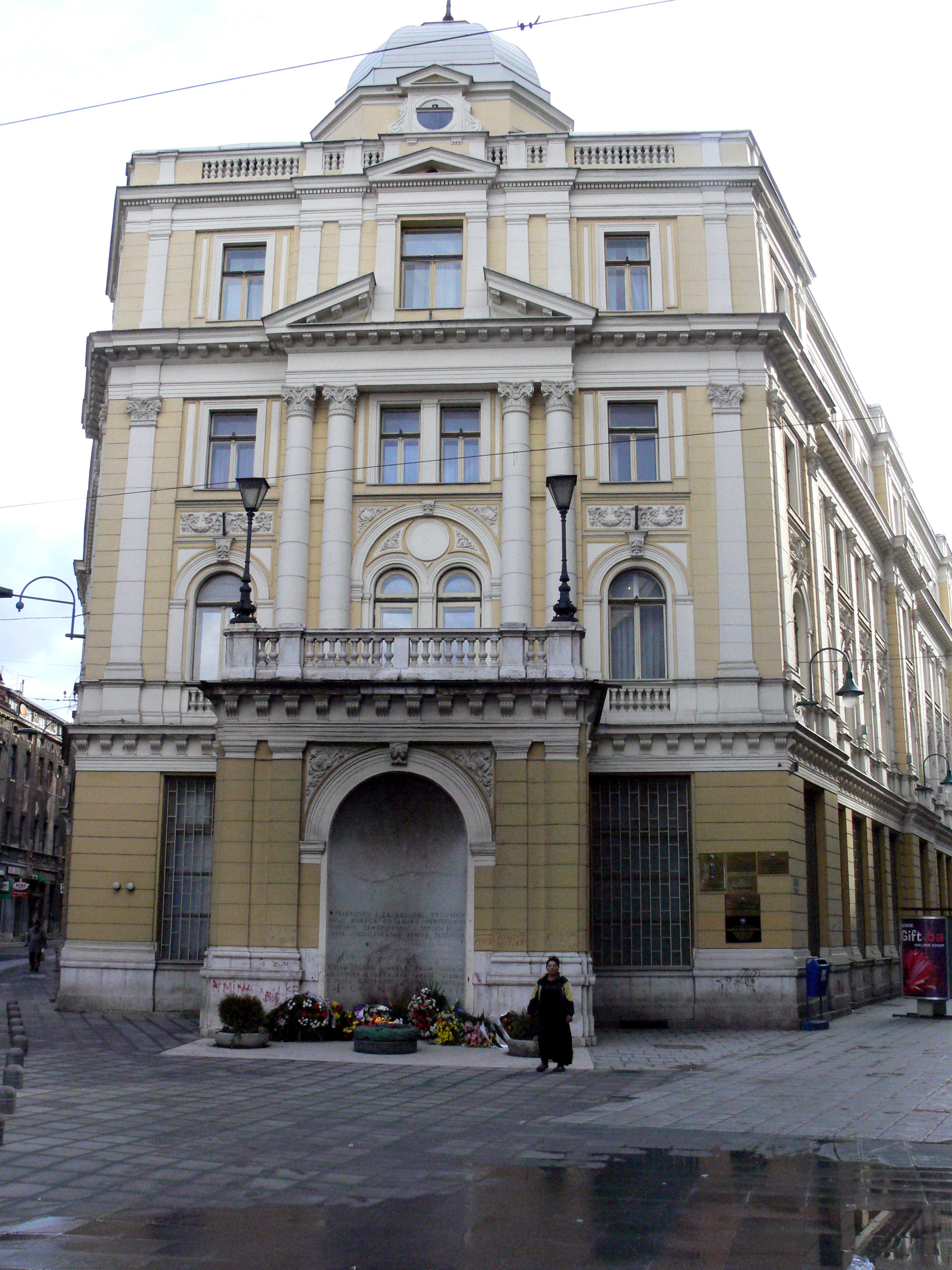
- The Landesbank building in Sarajevo, 2006
- Native name: Landesbank für Bosnien und Herzegowina
- Company type: State-owned enterprise
- Industry: Banking
- Founded: 1895 in Sarajevo
- Founder: Austro-Hungarian government authorities
- Defunct: 1946
- Fate: Nationalised
- Successor: National Bank of Yugoslavia
- Headquarters: Sarajevo, Bosnia and Herzegovina
- Area served: Bosnia and Herzegovina
- Products: Banking services

The Landesbank für Bosnien und Herzegowina (Serbo-Croatian: Privilegovana zemaljska banka za Bosnu i Hercegovinu, lit. 'Bank of the Lands of Bosnia and Herzegovina') was a bank established in Sarajevo in 1895 to help finance the development of Bosnia and Herzegovina under Austro-Hungarian rule. It kept operating after the establishment of the Kingdom of Yugoslavia and during World War II, but was liquidated in the late 1940s.

Its former head office, initially built as a hotel, is a landmark of Sarajevo.

== History ==
=== Austro-Hungarian era ===
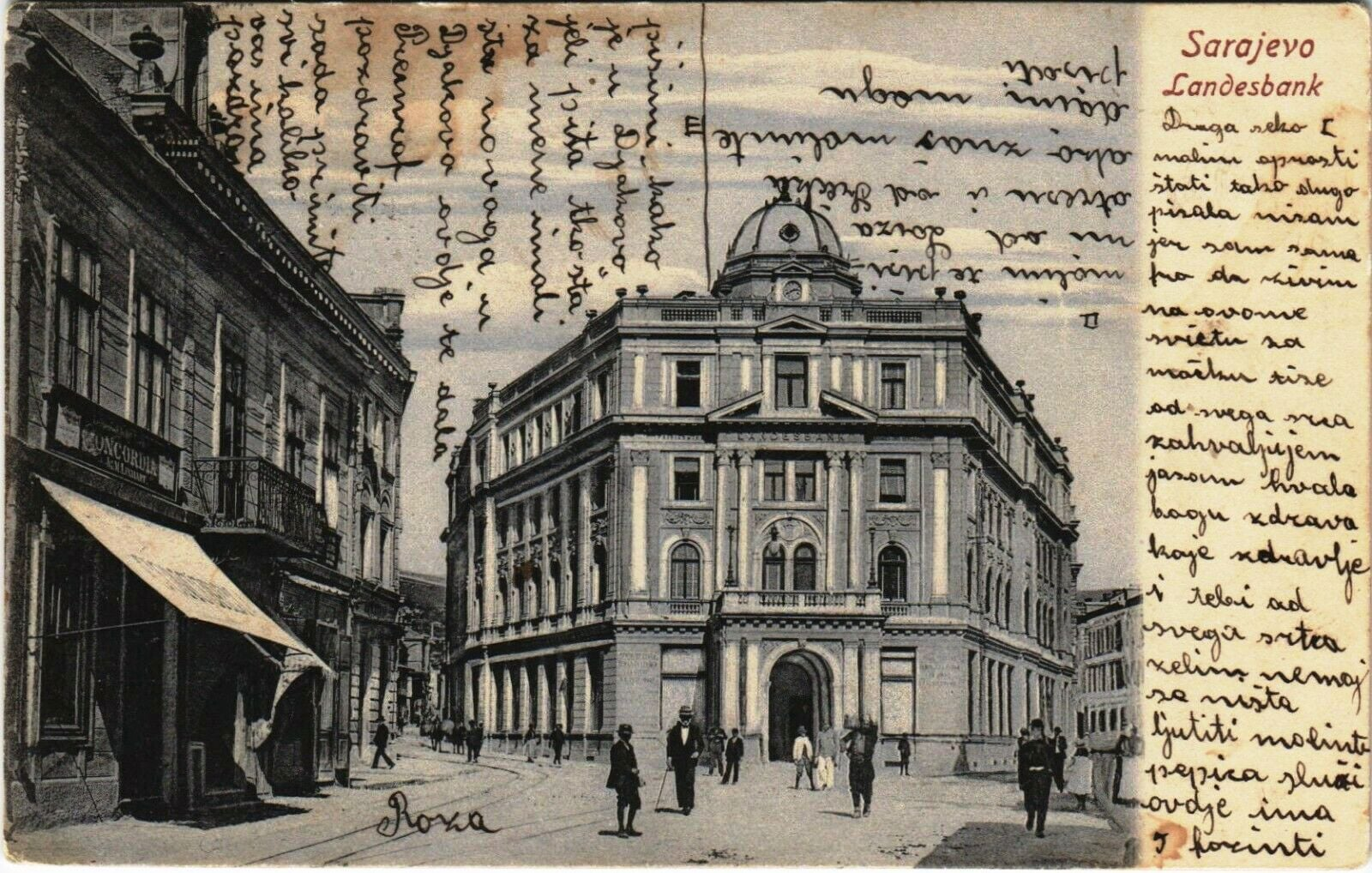
1900 postcard

In 1895, the Wiener Bankverein led the creation of the Landesbank in Sarajevo, at the initiative of the Austro-Hungarian government authorities and in cooperation with the Hungarian Bank for Industry and Commerce (German: Ungarische Bank für Industrie und Handel). The Landesbank absorbed two government-owned banks which were previously the most important in Bosnia, respectively the Hypothecar Credit-Anstalt and the Credit-Anstalt und Sparkassa. It soon established branches in Banja Luka, Bijeljina, Brčko, Mostar, and Tuzla. In 1907, Gligorije Jeftanović represented the Serbian community in the bank's board of directors. By the end of the Austro-Hungarian period, the local government held an equity stake alongside the Wiener Bankverein and the Creditanstalt.

=== Yugoslav era ===
The bank survived the turmoil of World War I and, while still under the control of the Wiener Bankverein and its new shareholders the Banque Belge pour l'Étranger and Basler Handelsbank, adapted to the new conditions in the newly created Kingdom of Yugoslavia. Nikola Berković, who had been the Landesbank's deputy head since its creation, was appointed its president and general manager in 1919. In 1928, the Landesbank was a founding minority shareholder of the Allgemeiner Jugoslawischer Bankverein (Serbo-Croatian: Opšte jugoslovensko bankarsko društvo, AJB), the Yugoslav bank created from the Wiener Bankverein's former branches in Zagreb and Belgrade. In turn, the AJB's controlling investors also became the controlling shareholders of the Landesbank. Following the Anschluss in 1938, Deutsche Bank became the dominant shareholder of Wiener Bankverein, which in the meantime had merged with Creditanstalt, and thus became influential in the Landesbank.

=== World War II and aftermath ===
In 1940, Deutsche Bank bought out the Landesbank's Belgian shareholders and thus took majority control. In 1941, most of the Landesbank's territory of operations became part of the Independent State of Croatia. Under Deutsche Bank's control, Berkovic then became the Landesbank's chairman and was able to expand the bank's operations under the period's chaotic conditions.

The Landesbank was nationalized by the Yugoslav authorities by December 1946, together with all other banks in the country, and merged into the National Bank of Yugoslavia.

== Head office building ==
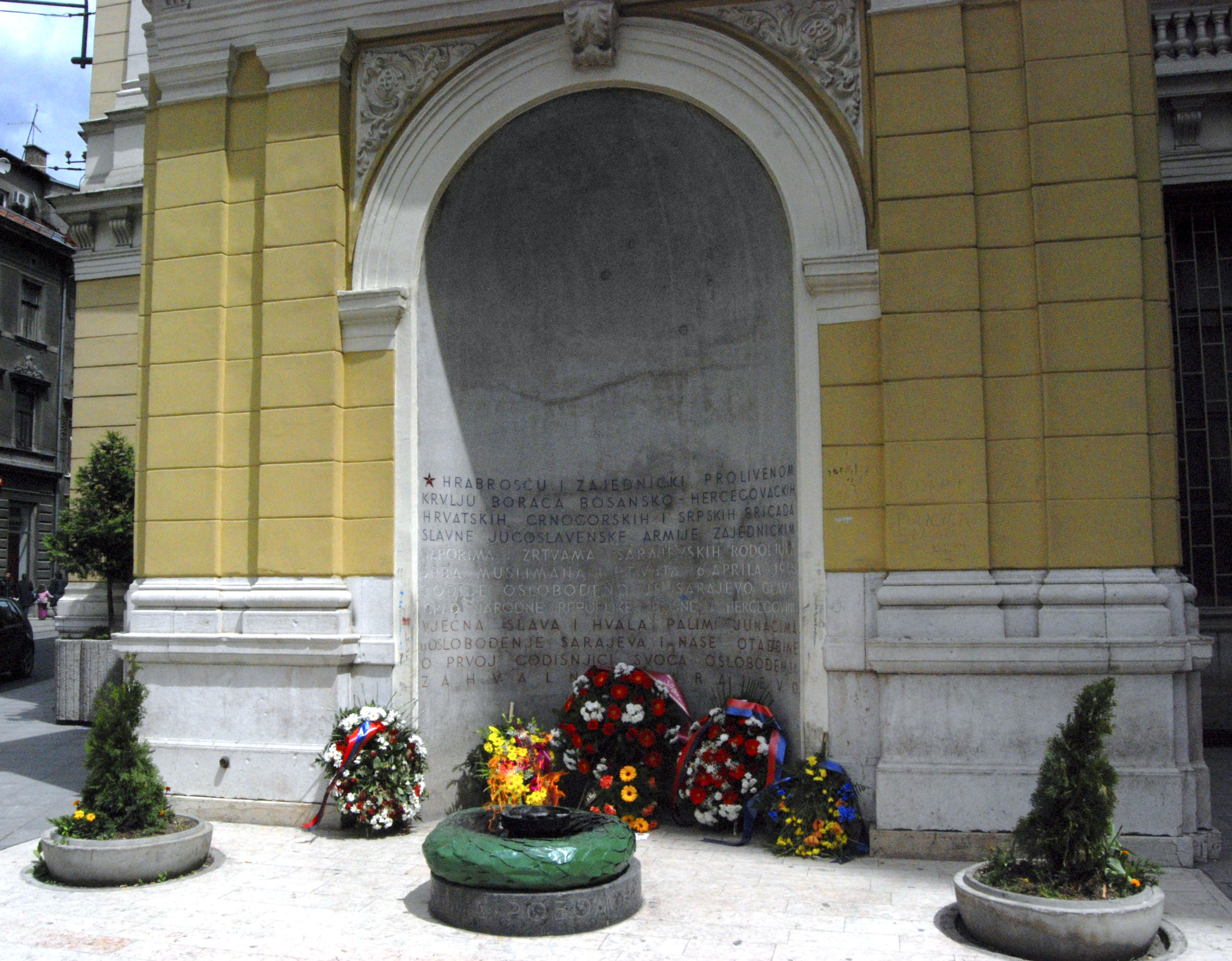
The Eternal Flame in 2008

In 1896, the bank moved into the building of the Grand Hotel, which had recently closed after only one year of operations. The building had been erected in 1893-1895 on a design by architects Karel Pařík and Josip Vancaš. It occupies a prominent location at the eastern end of Sarajevo's main thoroughfare, named Marshal Tito street since 1945.

On 6 April 1946, the Eternal Flame monument, a tribute to the Yugoslav Partisans designed by Juraj Neidhardt, was inaugurated at the front of the Landesbank building, replacing the former main entrance. The building later hosted various administrative services of the Ministry of Finance and Treasury of Bosnia and Herzegovina.

== See also ==
- Zemská Banka
- Hotel Europe (Sarajevo)
- Landesbank
- List of banks in Yugoslavia
