= Alija Izetbegović =

Bosnian politician (1925–2003)

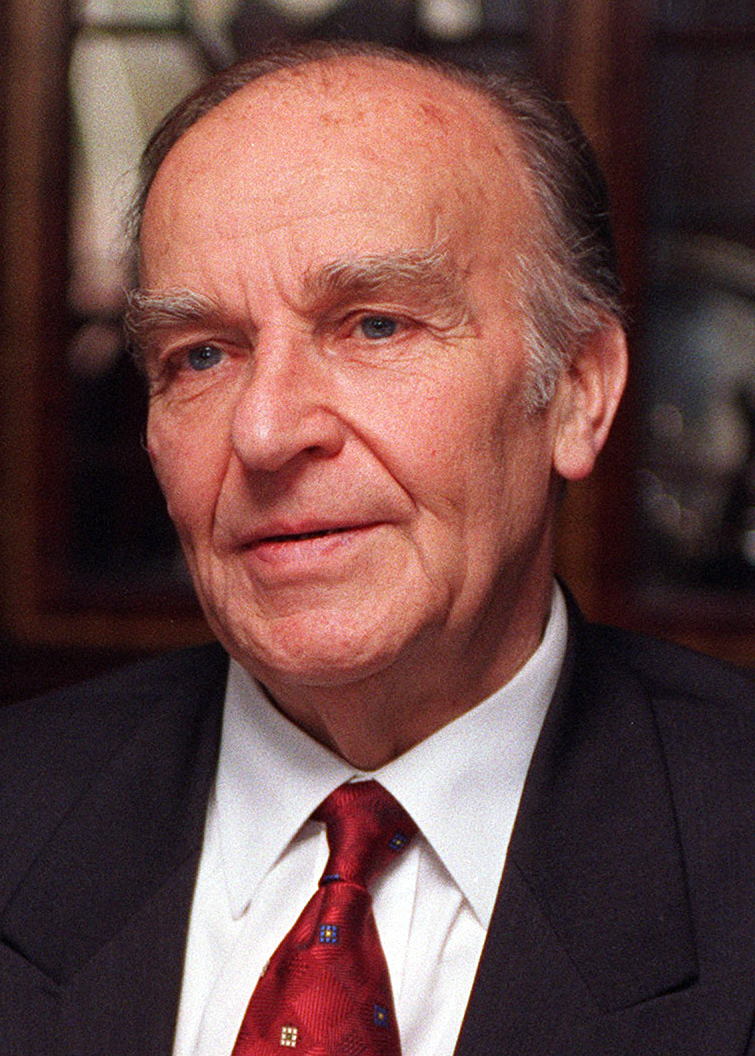
- Izetbegović in 1997

Chairman of the Presidency of Bosnia and Herzegovina
- In office 14 February 2000 – 14 October 2000
- Preceded by: Ante Jelavić
- Succeeded by: Živko Radišić
- In office 5 October 1996 – 13 October 1998
- Preceded by: Himself
- Succeeded by: Živko Radišić

President of the Presidency of the Republic of Bosnia and Herzegovina
- In office 20 December 1990 – 5 October 1996
- Prime Minister: Jure Pelivan; Mile Akmadžić; Haris Silajdžić; Hasan Muratović
- Vice President: Adil Zulfikarpašić
- Preceded by: Obrad Piljak (as President of the Presidency of SR Bosnia and Herzegovina)
- Succeeded by: Himself (as Chairman of the Tripartite presidency)

Bosniak member of the Presidency of Bosnia and Herzegovina
- In office 20 December 1990 – 14 October 2000 Serving with Fikret Abdić (1992–1993); Nijaz Duraković (1993–1996)
- Preceded by: Office established
- Succeeded by: Halid Genjac

President of the Party of Democratic Action
- In office 26 May 1990 – 13 October 2001
- Preceded by: Office established
- Succeeded by: Sulejman Tihić

Personal details
- Born: 8 August 1925 Bosanski Šamac, Kingdom of Serbs, Croats and Slovenes
- Died: 19 October 2003 (aged 78) Sarajevo, Bosnia and Herzegovina
- Party: Party of Democratic Action
- Spouse: Halida Repovac (m. 1949)
- Children: 3, including Bakir
- Education: University of Sarajevo (LLB, LLM)
- Occupation: Politician; activist; author; philosopher
- Profession: Politician; Lawyer
- Awards: Grand Order of Queen Jelena; Order of the State of Republic of Turkey; Order of Independence

Military service
- Allegiance: Bosnia and Herzegovina
- Branch/service: Bosnian Army
- Years of service: 1992–1996
- Rank: Commander-in-chief
- Commands: Army of the Republic of Bosnia and Herzegovina (supreme commander)
- Battles/wars: Bosnian War; Croat–Bosniak War; Intra-Bosnian Muslim War

Alija Izetbegović (Note: Bosnian pronunciation: [ǎlija ǐzedbeɡoʋitɕ]) (8 August 1925 – 19 October 2003) was a Bosnian politician, Islamic philosopher and author who served as the president of the presidency of the Republic of Bosnia and Herzegovina from 1990 to 1996. He later served as the first chairman of the presidency of Bosnia and Herzegovina from 1996 to 1998, and then briefly in 2000. He was also the founder and first president of the Party of Democratic Action.

Shortly after his term began, the country's Serb community under the leadership of the Serb Democratic Party created the Republika Srpska and attempted to prevent the secession of Bosnia and Herzegovina from Yugoslavia. This would lead to the outbreak of the Bosnian War.

As President, Izetbegović served as the political head of the Bosnian government. The Army of the Republic of Bosnia and Herzegovina (ARBiH) initially fought in an uneasy alliance with Croat forces. This alliance collapsed when Croat forces, backed by Croatia, launched a military campaign to establish the unrecognized parastate of Herzeg-Bosnia. The resulting Croat–Bosniak War was halted by the 1994 Washington Agreement, which Izetbegović signed with Croatian President Franjo Tuđman.

The war in Bosnia and Herzegovina continued, with widespread ethnic cleansing and other war crimes, committed mostly by Bosnian Serb forces against the Bosniak and Croat population throughout Bosnia. This culminated in the massacre of male Bosniaks in Srebrenica by Serb forces which would later be determined to be genocide. Izetbegović was also a signatory for the Dayton Agreement, which ended the war in a stalemate following NATO bombings, and recognized Republika Srpska as an autonomous entity within Bosnia and Herzegovina. He continued to serve in this role until October 1996, when he became a member of the Presidency of Bosnia and Herzegovina, serving until his resignation in October 2000.

Izetbegović was also the author of several books, most notably Islam Between East and West and the Islamic Declaration.

== Early life and education ==
Izetbegović was born on 8 August 1925 in the town of Bosanski Šamac. While serving as a soldier in Üsküdar, Izetbegović's paternal grandfather Alija, from Belgrade, married a Turkish woman named Sıdıka Hanım. The couple eventually moved to Bosanski Šamac and had five children. Izetbegović's grandfather later became the town's mayor.

Izetbegović's father, an accountant, had fought for the Austro-Hungarian Army on the Italian Front during World War I and sustained serious injuries which left him in a semi-paralyzed state for at least a decade. He declared bankruptcy in 1927. The following year, the family moved to Sarajevo, where Izetbegović received a secular education.

In 1941, Izetbegović helped to found a Bosnian Islamist organization named "Young Muslims" (Mladi Muslimani), which was modeled after the Muslim Brotherhood. The "Young Muslims" became torn between supporting the largely Muslim Waffen-SS Handschar Division or the communist Yugoslav Partisans. The New York Times claims he joined the SS Handschar, despite a lack of evidence. Izetbegović's family denied the claim and claimed that he had joined the communist Yugoslav Partisans. Izetbegović was detained by the Serb royalist Chetniks in mid-1944, but released by Chetnik voivode Dragutin Keserović.

After the war, due to his association with the "Young Muslims" and opposition to the regime, Izetbegović was arrested by the Yugoslav communist authorities in 1946 and sentenced to three years in prison. After serving his sentence, he went on to earn a law degree at the University of Sarajevo's Faculty of Law in 1956 and remained actively engaged in politics.

== Dissident and activist ==
In 1970, Izetbegović published a manifesto entitled the Islamic Declaration, expressing his views on relationships between Islam, state and society. The manifesto was banned by the government. In it, he tried to reconcile Western-style progress with Islamic tradition. The work issued a call for "Islamic renewal" without mentioning Yugoslavia specifically. However, he and his supporters were accused by the Communist authorities of reviving the "Young Muslims" organisation and of a conspiracy to set up an "Islamically pure" Bosnia and Herzegovina.

The declaration designated Pakistan as a model country to be emulated by Muslim revolutionaries worldwide. One of the passages that was in particular picked out by his opponents during the trial was, "There can be no peace or coexistence between the Islamic faith and non-Islamic social and political institutions...the state should be an expression of religion and should support its moral concepts." The declaration remains a source of controversy. Serbs, who were opposed to Izetbegović, often quoted the declaration as indicative of an intent to create an Iranian-style Islamic republic in Bosnia.

He himself later insisted many times that the statements about the creation of an Islamic state were hypothetical and were not to be the applied to the situation in Bosnia. Regardless, Bosnia's non-Muslim population were unsettled by several of his statements in his writings. Passages from the declaration were frequently quoted by Izetbegović's opponents during the 1990s, who considered it to be an open statement of Islamic fundamentalism. This opinion is also shared by some Western authors. Izetbegović vigorously denied these accusations.

=== Imprisonment ===
After his initial arrest in 1946, Izetbegović was sentenced to jail in various cases in a total for 8 years for his political activities.

In April 1983, Izetbegović and twelve other Bosniak activists (including Melika Salihbegović, Edhem Bičakčić, Omer Behmen, Mustafa Spahić and Hasan Čengić) were arrested and tried before a Sarajevo court for "hostile and counter-revolutionary activity from the positions of the Muslim Nationalism". Izetbegović was further accused of organizing a visit to a Muslim congress in Iran. All of those tried were convicted and Izetbegović was sentenced to fourteen years in prison.

The verdict was strongly criticised by Western human rights organisations, including Amnesty International and Helsinki Watch, which claimed the case was based on "communist propaganda", and the accused were not charged with either using or advocating violence. The following May, the Bosnian Supreme Court conceded the point with an announcement that "some of the actions of the accused did not have the characteristics of criminal acts" and reduced Izetbegović's sentence to twelve years. In 1988, as communist rule faltered, he was pardoned and released after almost five years in prison. His health had suffered serious damage.

== Early political career and 1990 election ==
The introduction of a multi-party system in Yugoslavia at the end of the 1980s prompted Izetbegović and other Bosniak activists to establish a political party, the Party of Democratic Action (Stranka Demokratske Akcije, SDA) in 1990. It had a largely Muslim character; similarly, the other principal ethnic groups in Bosnia and Herzegovina, the Serbs and Croats, also established ethnically based parties (SDS and HDZ BiH). The SDA won the largest share of the vote, 33% of the seats, with the next runners-up being nationalist ethnic parties representing Serbs and Croats. Fikret Abdić won the popular vote for Presidency member among the Bosniak candidates, with 44% of the vote, Izetbegović with 37%. According to the Bosnian constitution, the first two candidates of each of the three constitutient nations would be elected to a seven-member multi-ethnic rotating presidency (with two Croats, two Serbs, two Bosniaks and one Yugoslav); a Croat took the post of prime minister and a Serb the presidency of the Assembly. Abdić agreed to stand down as the Bosniak candidate for the Presidency and Izetbegović became Chairman of the Presidency.

== Presidency (1990–2000) ==
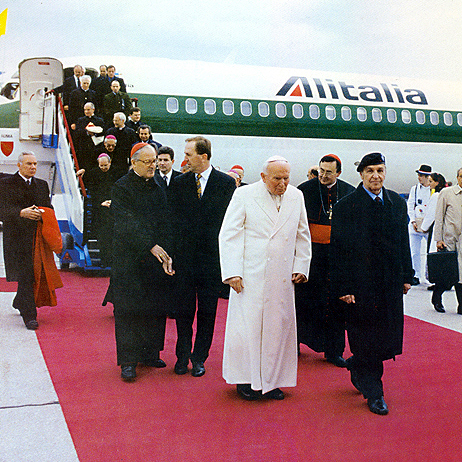
Izetbegović with Pope John Paul II in 1997

Bosnia and Herzegovina's power-sharing arrangements broke down very quickly as ethnic tensions grew after the outbreak of fighting between Serbs and Croats in neighboring Croatia. Although Izetbegović was due to hold the presidency for only one year according to the constitution, this arrangement was initially suspended due to "extraordinary circumstances" and was eventually abandoned altogether during the war as the Serb and Croat nationalistic parties SDS and HDZ BiH abandoned the government. When fighting broke out in Slovenia and Croatia in the summer of 1991, it was immediately apparent that Bosnia and Herzegovina would soon become embroiled in the conflict. Izetbegović initially proposed a loose confederation to preserve a unitary Bosnian state and strongly urged a peaceful solution. He did not subscribe to the "peace at all costs" view and commented in February 1991 that "I would sacrifice peace for a sovereign Bosnia and Herzegovina ... but for that peace in Bosnia and Herzegovina I would not sacrifice sovereignty." He abandoned the Zulfikarpašić–Karadžić agreement which would see Bosnia as a sovereign state in a confederation with Serbia and Montenegro, with 60% of Sandžak ceded to Bosnia.

On 6 October 1991, Izetbegović gave a televised proclamation of neutrality, it included the statement "it is not our war". Izetbegović made a statement before the Bosnian parliament on 14 October with regard to the JNA: "Do not do anything against the Army. (...) the presence of the Army is a stabilizing factor to us, and we need that Army... Until now, we did not have problems with the Army, and we will not have problems later." Izetbegović had a testy exchange with Bosnian Serb leader and SDS president Radovan Karadžić in parliament on that day. After Karadžić wagered that the Bosniak Muslims could not defend themselves if a state of war developed, Izetbegović observed that he found Karadžić's manner and speech offensive and it explained why the Bosniaks felt unwelcome, that his tone might explain why the others federated by Yugoslavia felt repelled, and that the threats of Karadžić were unworthy of the Serb people.

By the start of 1992, it had become apparent that the rival nationalist demands were fundamentally incompatible: the Bosniaks and Croats sought an independent Bosnia and Herzegovina while the Serbs wanted it to remain in a rump Yugoslavia dominated by Serbia. Izetbegović publicly complained that he was being forced to ally with one side or the other, vividly characterising the dilemma by comparing it to having to choose between leukemia and a brain tumour. In January 1992, Portuguese diplomat José Cutileiro drafted a plan, later known as the Lisbon Agreement, that would turn Bosnia into a triethnic cantonal state. Initially, all three sides signed up to the agreement; Izetbegović for the Bosniaks, Karadžić for the Serbs and Mate Boban for the Croats. Some two weeks later, however, Izetbegović withdrew his signature and declared his opposition to any type of partition of Bosnia, supposedly encouraged by Warren Zimmermann, the United States Ambassador to Yugoslavia at the time.

=== Bosnian War ===
In February 1992, Izetbegović called an independence referendum on the European condition for recognition of Bosnia and Herzegovina as an independent state, despite warnings from the Serb members of the presidency that it was unconstitutional and that any move towards independence would result in the Serb-inhabited areas seceding to remain with the rump Yugoslavia. The referendum achieved a 99.4% vote in favor on a 63% turnout, largely boycotted by the Serbs. Namely, according to the constitution of the Socialist Republic of Bosnia and Herzegovina, the change of the state-legal status was not possible without the national consensus of all three nations. This mechanism was incorporated into the constitution due to the genocide committed against Serbs in World War II, which disturbed the ethnic balance. Another possibility was for two-thirds of the citizens to vote in a referendum to leave the Yugoslav federation. The Serbs did not agree with the secession from Yugoslavia. Furthermore, less than two-thirds of the population went to the referendum. Nevertheless, the EU and the US accepted the referendum.

The Bosnian parliament, already vacated by the Bosnian Serbs, formally declared independence from Yugoslavia on 29 February and Izetbegović announced the country's independence on 3 March. It did not take effect until 7 April 1992, when the European Union and United States recognized the new country. Sporadic fighting between Serbs and government forces occurred across Bosnia in the run-up to international recognition. Izetbegović appears to have gambled that the international community would send a peacekeeping force upon recognising Bosnia in order to prevent a war, but this did not happen. Instead, war immediately broke out across the country as Serb and Yugoslav army forces took control of large areas against the poorly equipped government security forces. Initially, Serb forces attacked the non-Serb civilian population in eastern Bosnia. Once towns and villages were securely in their hands, the Serb forces systematically ransacked or burnt down Bosniak houses and apartments, Bosniak civilians were rounded up or captured, and sometimes beaten or killed in the process. Men and women were separated, with many of the men detained in the camps. The women were kept in various detention centres where they had to live in intolerably unhygienic conditions, including also being raped repeatedly by Serb soldiers or policemen.

Izetbegović consistently promoted the idea of a multi-ethnic Bosnia under central control, which seemed a hopeless strategy under the circumstances. The Bosnian Croats, disillusioned with the Sarajevo government and supported militarily and financially by the Croatian government, increasingly turned to establishing their own ethnically based state of Croatian Republic of Herzeg-Bosnia in Herzegovina and Central Bosnia. The Croats pulled out of the Sarajevo government and fighting broke out in 1993. In some areas local armistices were signed between the Serbs and Croats. Croat forces launched their first attacks on Bosniaks in central Bosnia in June 1992, but these failed. The Graz agreement caused deep division among Bosnian Croats and strengthened separatist Herzeg-Bosnia, and led to the Lašva Valley ethnic cleansing campaign against Bosniak civilians from May 1992 to March 1993.

Adding to the general confusion, Izetbegović's former colleague Fikret Abdić established an Autonomous Province of Western Bosnia in parts of Cazin and Velika Kladuša municipalities in opposition to the Sarajevo government and in cooperation with Slobodan Milošević and Franjo Tuđman. Abdić's faction was eventually routed by the Bosnian army. By this time, Izetbegović's government controlled only about 25% of the country and represented principally the Bosniak community.

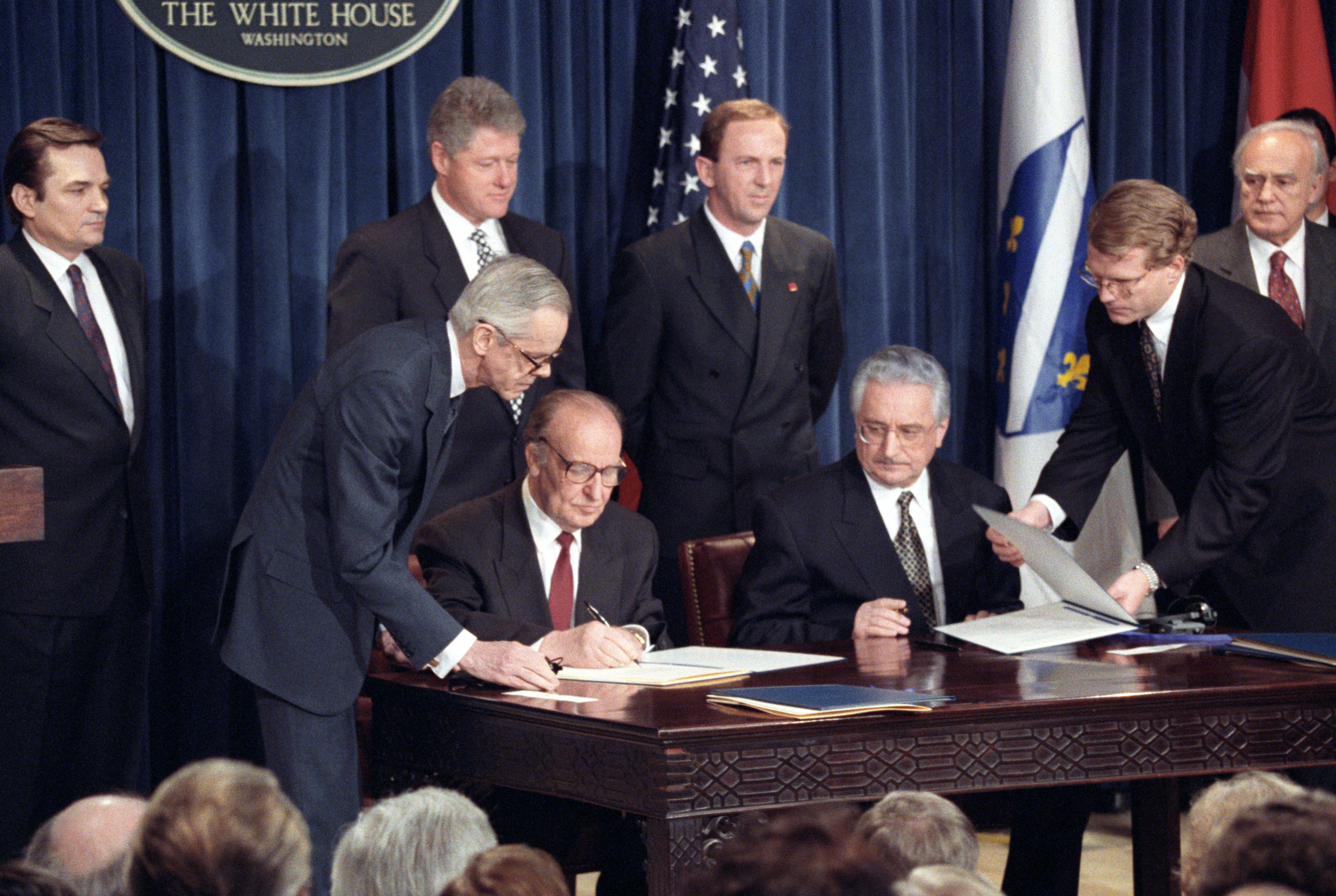
Izetbegović and Franjo Tuđman signing the Washington Agreement in 1994

For three and a half years, Izetbegović lived precariously in a besieged Sarajevo surrounded by Serb forces. He denounced the failure of Western countries to reverse Serbian aggression and turned instead to the Muslim world, with which he had already established relations during his days as a dissident. The Bosnian government received money and arms. Osama bin Laden was given a Bosnian passport during Izetbegović's presidency and went on to visit Bosnia and Kosovo several times. Bin Laden stated to a German reporter that he planned to bring Muslim volunteers to Bosnia. Following massacres on Bosnian Muslims by Serb and, to a lesser extent, Croat forces, foreign Muslim volunteers joined the Bosnian army in the so-called Bosnian mujahideen, numbering between 300 and 1,500. They quickly attracted heavy criticism amplified by Serb and Croat propaganda, who considered their presence to be evidence of "violent Islamic fundamentalism" at the heart of Europe. However, the foreign volunteers became unpopular even with many of the Bosniak population, because the Bosnian army had thousands of troops and no need for more soldiers, but for arms. Many Bosnian army officers and intellectuals were suspicious regarding foreign volunteers' arrival in the central part of the country, because they came from Split and Zagreb in Croatia, and were passed through the self-proclaimed Herzeg-Bosnia unlike Bosnian army soldiers who were regularly arrested by Croat forces. According to general Stjepan Šiber, the highest-ranking ethnic Croat in the Bosnian army, the key roles in the foreign volunteers' arrival were played by Franjo Tuđman and Croatian counter-intelligence underground with the aim to justify the involvement of Croatia in the Bosnian War and mass crimes committed by Croat forces. Although Izetbegović regarded them as symbolically valuable as a sign of the Muslim world's support for Bosnia, they appear to have made little military difference and became a major political liability.

In 1993, Izetbegović agreed to a peace plan that would divide Bosnia along ethnic lines but continued to insist on a unitary Bosnia government from Sarajevo and on the allocation to the Bosniaks of a large percentage of Bosnia's territory. The war between the Bosniaks and Croats was eventually ended by a truce brokered with the aid of the Americans in March 1994, following which the two sides collaborated more closely against the Serbs. NATO then became increasingly involved in the conflict with occasional "pinprick" bombings conducted against the Bosnian Serbs, generally following violations of ceasefires and the no-fly zone over Bosnia. The Bosnian Croat forces benefited indirectly from US military training given to the Croatian Army. In addition, the Croatians provided considerable quantities of weaponry to the Bosnian Croats and much smaller amounts to the Bosnian army, despite a UN weapons embargo. Most of the Bosnian army's supply of weapons was airlifted from the Muslim world, specifically Iran – an issue which became the subject of some controversy and a US congressional investigation in 1996. In September 1993, the Second Bosniak Congress officially re-introduced the historical ethnic name Bosniaks. The Yugoslav "Muslims by nationality" policy was considered by Bosniaks to be neglecting and opposing their Bosnian identity because the term tried to describe Bosniaks as a religious group, not an ethnic one.

==== Ending the war ====
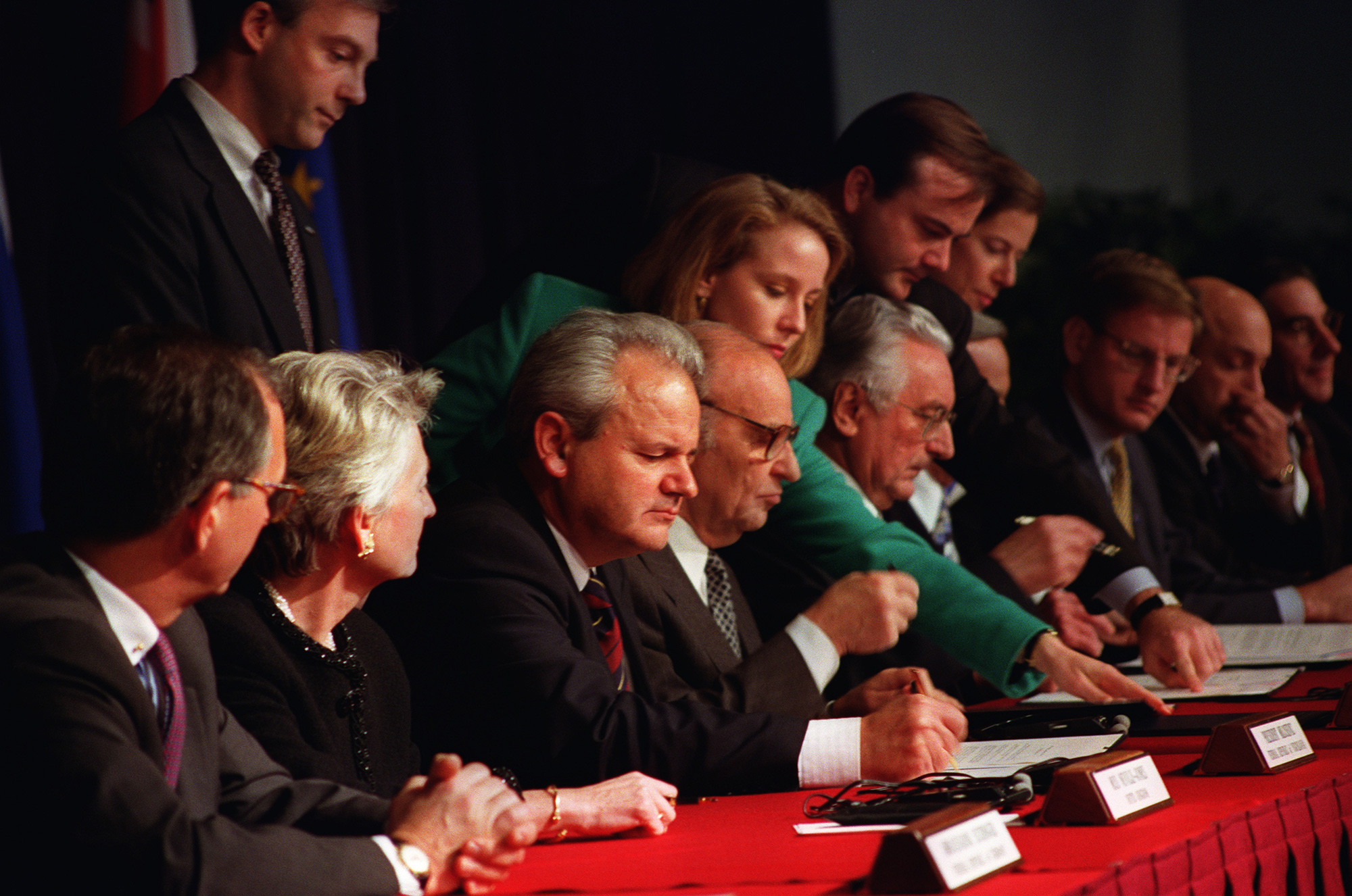
Slobodan Milošević, Izetbegović and Tuđman initialling the Dayton Agreement, 21 November 1995

The Washington Agreement in March 1994 ended the Croat-Bosniak War and divided the combined ARBiH and HVO territory into ten autonomous cantons, establishing the Federation of Bosnia and Herzegovina.

In August 1995, following the Srebrenica massacre and the 2nd Markale massacre, NATO launched an intensive bombing campaign which destroyed the Bosnian Serb command and control system. This allowed the Croatian and Bosniak forces to overrun many Serb-held areas of the country, producing a roughly 50/50 split of the territory between the two sides. The offensive came to a halt not far from the de facto Serb capital of Banja Luka.

When the Croat and Bosniak forces stopped their advance they had captured the power plants supplying Banja Luka's electricity and used that control to pressure the Serb leadership into accepting a ceasefire. The parties agreed to meet at Dayton, Ohio to negotiate a peace treaty under the supervision of the United States. Serb and Croat interests were represented by Milošević and Tuđman, respectively. Izetbegović represented the internationally recognized Bosnian government.

==== Post-war and ICTY ====
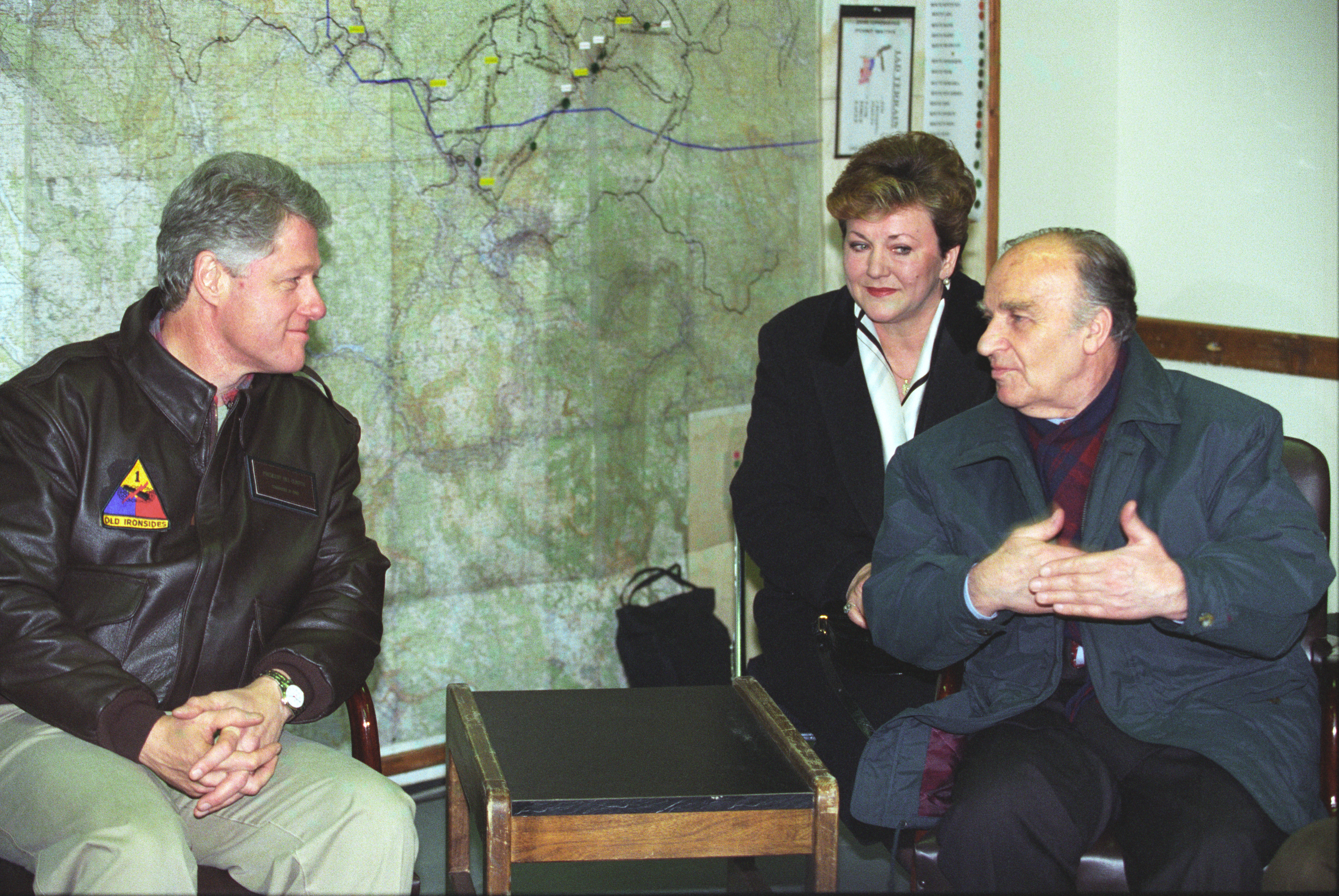
U.S. President Bill Clinton meeting with Izetbegović in Tuzla, 22 December 1997

After the Bosnian War was formally ended by the Dayton peace accord in November 1995, Izetbegović became a member of the Presidency of Bosnia and Herzegovina. His party's power declined after the international community installed a High Representative to oversee affairs of state, with more power than the Presidency or parliaments of either the Bosniak-Croat or Serb entities. He stepped down in October 2000 at the age of 74, citing poor health. However, Izetbegović remained popular with the Bosniak public, who nicknamed him Dedo (which in Bosnian means grandfather). His endorsement helped his party to bounce back in the 2002 general election. Some observers have described his rule as authoritarian with nationalist positions. An ICTY investigation of Izetbegović was in progress, but ended with his death. Spokesperson for ICTY, Florence Hartmann said the nature of the accusations against Izetbegović would not be revealed as he could not defend himself. As commander of Bosnian forces, he was probably being investigated for his "command responsibility" for atrocities committed by Bosnian soldiers.

== Death ==
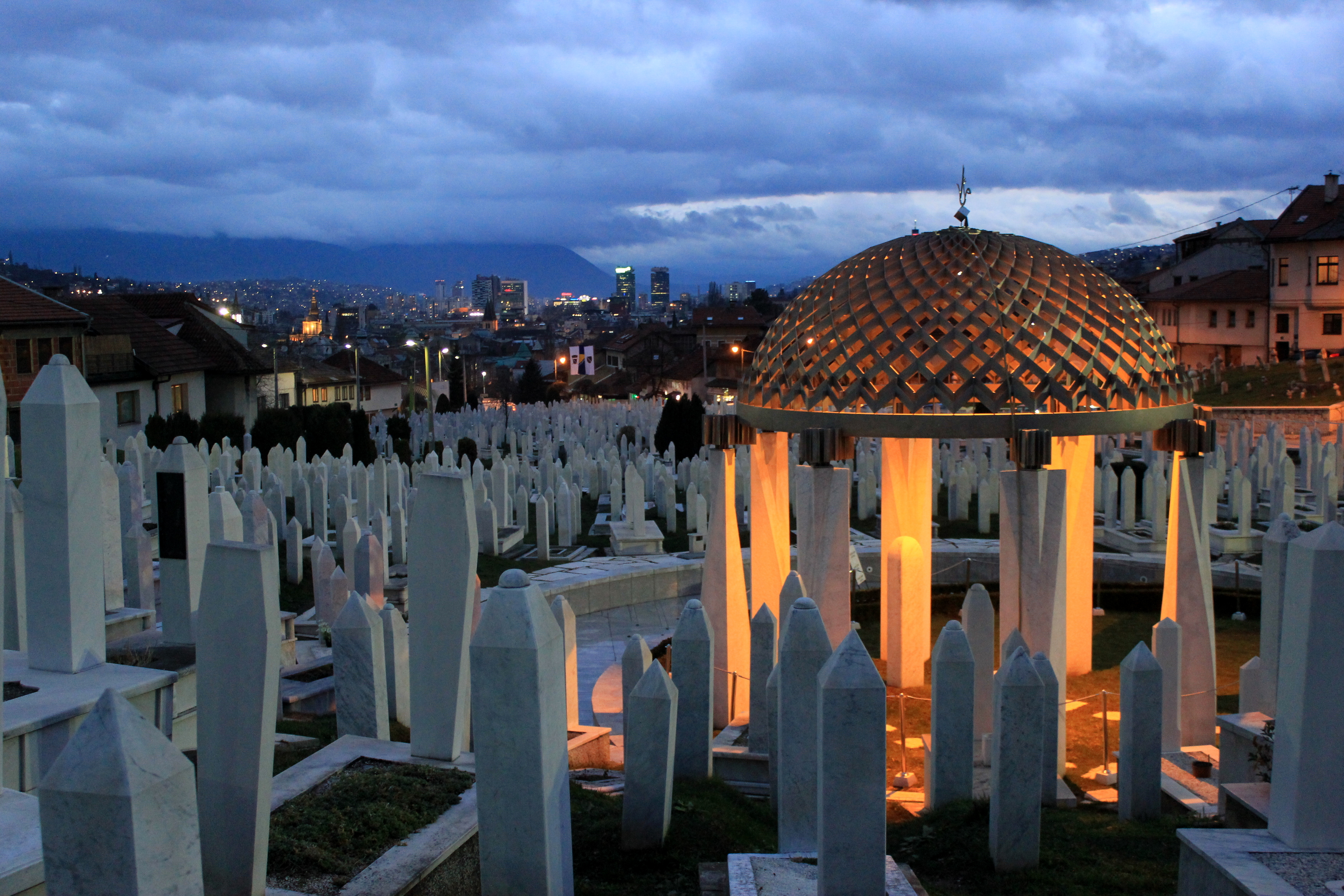
Izetbegović's grave in Sarajevo

Izetbegović died on 19 October 2003 of heart disease complicated by injuries suffered from a fall at home. His funeral, held three days after his death, on 22 October, drew many Bosnian officials, dignitaries from 44 foreign countries, 105 members of the Grand National Assembly of Turkey and between 100,000 and 150,000 people, with his family receiving over 4,000 telegrams. Over 400 journalists attended the funeral as it was broadcast live on TV with 37 cameras.

Following Izetbegović's death there was an initiative to rename a part of the main street of Sarajevo from Ulica Maršala Tita (Marshal Tito Street) and the Sarajevo International Airport in his honor. Following objections from politicians from Republika Srpska, the international community, and UN envoy Paddy Ashdown, both initiatives failed.

He had a son, Bakir, who also entered politics and served as Presidency member from 2010 to 2018, as well as two granddaughters (Jasmina and Mirzeta Izetbegović).

On 11 August 2006, Izetbegović's grave at the Kovači cemetery in Sarajevo was badly damaged by a bomb. The identity of the bomber or bombers has never been determined.

== Honours and decorations ==
=== Military rank ===
Award or decoration
Commander-in-chief of the Bosnian Armed Forces

=== International ===
Award or decoration	Country	Awarded by	Year	Place
Grand Order of Queen Jelena	Croatia	Franjo Tuđman	1995	Zagreb
Order of the State of Republic of Turkey	Turkey	Süleyman Demirel	1997	Ankara
Order of Independence	Qatar	Hamad bin Khalifa Al Thani	1998	Doha

== Writings ==
Available in English

- Islam Between East and West, Alija Ali Izetbegović, American Trust Publications, 1985 (also ABC Publications, 1993)
- Inescapable Questions: Autobiographical Notes, 'Alija Izetbegović, The Islamic Foundation, 2003
- Izetbegović of Bosnia and Herzegovina: Notes from Prison, 1983–1988, Alija Izetbegović, Greenwood Press, 2001
- Notes From Prison – 1983–1988
- The Islamic Declaration, Alija Izetbegović, s.n., 1991

Available in Bosnian

- Govori i pisma, Alija Izetbegović, SDA, 1994
- Rat i mir u Bosni i Hercegovini (Biblioteka Posebna izdanja), Alija Izetbegović, Vijece Kongresa bosnjackih intelektualaca, 1998
- Moj bijeg u slobodu: Biljeske iz zatvora 1983–1988 (Biblioteka Refleksi), Alija Izetbegović, Svjetlost, 1999
- Islamska deklaracija (Mala muslimanska biblioteka), Alija Izetbegović, Bosna, 1990

== Notes ==
Political offices
Office established	Bosniak member of the Presidency of Bosnia and Herzegovina; 1990–2000; Serving with Fikret Abdić (1992–1993); Nijaz Duraković (1993–1996)	Succeeded by Halid Genjac
Preceded by Obrad Piljak as President of the Presidency of SR Bosnia and Herzegovina	President of the Presidency of the Republic of Bosnia and Herzegovina; 1990–1996	Succeeded by Himself as Chairman of the Tripartite presidency
Preceded by Himself	Chairman of the Presidency of Bosnia and Herzegovina; 1996–1998	Succeeded by Živko Radišić
Preceded by Ante Jelavić	Chairman of the Presidency of Bosnia and Herzegovina; 2000	Succeeded by Živko Radišić
