= Čemaluša Mosque =

Former mosque in Sarajevo, Bosnia and Herzegovina

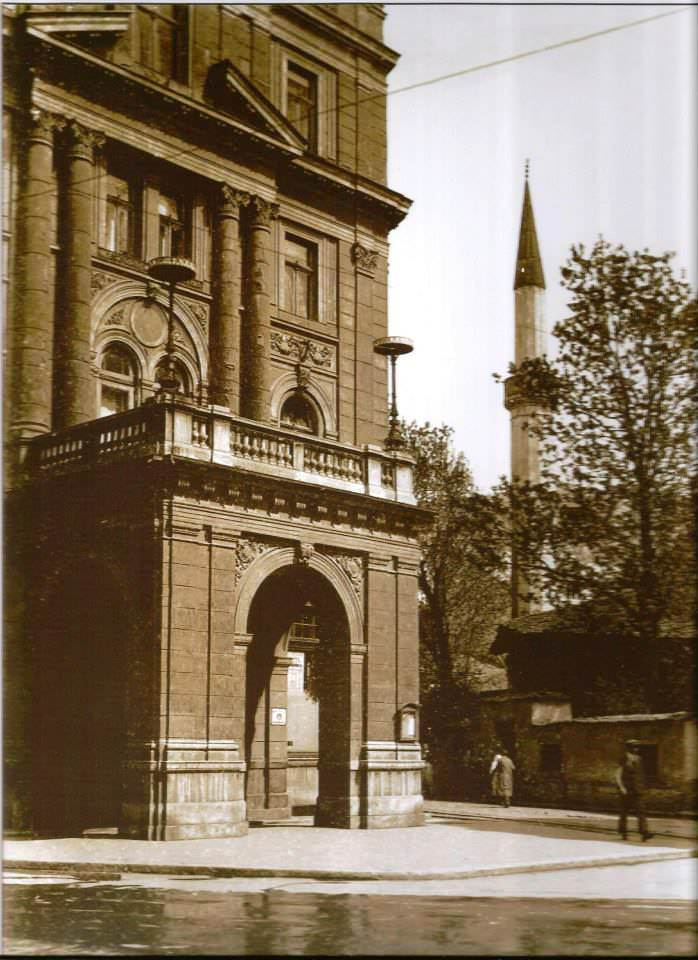
- Čemaluša mosque in 1936

- Location of the former mosque in Sarajevo

Religion
- Affiliation: Sunni Islam (former)
- Ecclesiastical or organizational status: Mosque (1515–1940)
- Status: Demolished

Location
- Location: Sarajevo
- Country: Bosnia and Herzegovina
- Interactive map of Čemaluša Mosque
- Coordinates: 43°51′31″N 18°25′21″E

Architecture
- Architect: Havadža Kemaludin
- Type: Mosque
- Style: Ottoman
- Completed: 1515 CE
- Demolished: 1940

Specifications
- Dome: 1
- Minaret: 1

The Čemaluša Mosque (Bosnian: Čemaluševa džamija; Turkish: Cemaluşa camii), also known as the Havadža Kemaludin Mosque, was a former mosque located in Sarajevo, in Bosnia and Herzegovina. Completed in the 16th century, during the Ottoman era, the mosque was situated between Ferhadija street and Maršala Tito street and was located at the corner of the street with the same name, Čemaluša.

Demolished in 1940, the residential and business building, also named after Havadža Kemaludin (simply known as JAT building), was completed in 1947 on the site of the former mosque.

== History ==
Čemaluša Mosque was designed and built in 1515 by Havadža Kemaludin who was a student at that time. The mosque had a stone minaret located on the left, a roof on four waters, covered with shingles. The arched windows were framed with plaster and stained glass. The wide ceiling above the mihrab with stalactites was filled with tiny pieces of multicolored carved wood. Ablution was performed on two fountains - male and female water.

Next to the former mosque was a large cemetery, surrounded by a wall, which dates back to the time of the Ottoman conquest of Bosnia. Members of the Hadžimusić, Novo and Dženetić families were buried in the harem of Čemaluša. War veteran Mustaj-beg Dženetić, who died in 1874, bequeathed a hundred ducats to the waqf in his will with an explicit order to bury him between the two oldest martyrs' tombstones.

Following the arrival of Austro-Hungarians, the Čemaluša street began to abruptly rise with traditional Bosnian houses being replaced with buildings which spanned through Ferhadija.

Čemaluša Mosque was demolished in 1940 by the government of the Kingdom of Yugoslavia who ordered the demolition in June 1939. Reuf Kadić later designed and built the modern-day JAT building in 1947.

== See also ==
- Islam in Bosnia and Herzegovina
- List of mosques in Bosnia and Herzegovina
