= MESS (festival) =

MESS International Theatre Festival
- MESS
- Location: Sarajevo, Bosnia and Herzegovina
- Founded: 1960
- Founded by: Jurislav Korenić
- Selector: Nihad Kreševljaković
- Festival date: October
- Website: www.mess.ba

The MESS International Theatre Festival (MESS) is a theatre festival that takes place annually in Sarajevo, Bosnia and Herzegovina. It is the oldest living theatre festival in the Balkans, programming international experimental performances and emerging artists. MESS was the largest theatre festival in the Former Yugoslavia and was named one of Living Theatre's international showcases in 1974. It survived the Siege of Sarajevo, during which it hosted directors such as Susan Sontag and Peter Schumann. It organized the first edition of the Sarajevo Film Festival in 1993 and still acts as a collective board member today. Today it is the largest theatre festival in Bosnia and Herzegovina and one of the largest in South-Eastern Europe. In 2009 it expanded its activities to the city of Zenica, which now hosts parts of the regional program.

== History ==
The festival was founded in 1960 under the name Festival malih i eksperimentalnih scena Jugoslavije (Festival of small and experimental stages of Yugoslavia). It was founded on the initiative of Yugoslavian theatre director, Jurislav Korenić. It was originally conceived as an annual gathering of the country's professional theatre companies with the goal of presenting the best experimental theatre pieces of the previous year. The specificity of the concept quickly garnered a wider audience and secured visits from international experimental theatre companies, such as Living Theater from New York City, that named the festival one of its four major annual show-piece platforms.

With the start of the Bosnian war in 1992 the festival's run was halted, only for it to be renamed and rebranded by a directorate of Bosnian artists and intellectuals, headed by theatre director Haris Pašović, with the desire to artistically resist the Siege of Sarajevo. Furthermore, the festival organized the first edition of the Sarajevo Film Festival in 1993 under the working title Poslije kraja svijeta (After the end of the world). During this period in time the festival produced numerous pieces by theatre directors such as Susan Sontag and Peter Schumann, who entered the besieged city to take part in the artistic resistance against the war. With the signing of the Dayton Peace Accords the festival was taken over by a team of young theatre professionals headed by newly named manager Dino Mustafić. The first post-war edition of the festival hosted directors such as Giorgio Strehler, Frank Castorf and Peter Schumann.

In 2008 the festival changed its original format by introducing a handful of new programs. The Mittel Europe MESS program is designed to showcase the most interesting theatre pieces from the Former Yugoslavia and the wider South-Eastern European region. The World MESS program hosts pieces from Africa, Asia and Latin America, while the Future MESS program cultivates the original concept of the festival by showcasing the most experimental and subversive productions from across the globe. Furthermore, a children's program has also been established under the name Children MESS.

Theatre directors that have taken part in the festival include: Peter Brook, Giorgio Strehler, Robert Wilson, Peter Schumann, Eugenio Barba, Anne Teresa de Keersmaeker, Eimuntas Nekrošius, Alvis Hermanis, Olivier Py, Mark Tompkins, Wlodzimierz Staniewski, Simon McBurney, Christoph Marthaler, Frank Castorf, Thomas Ostermeier, Andriy Zholdak, Rimas Tuminas, Emma Dante, Rodrigo Garcia, Heiner Goebbels Romeo Castellucci, Wim Vandekeybus, Forced Entertainment, Laert Vasili.

== Memory Modul ==
The Memory Modul is a cultural project initiated by the festival in 1995 with the goal of preserving the memory of the war in Bosnia and Herzegovina. The project has worked to keep hundreds of documents, photographs and videos from being forgotten and has offered audiences new and creative works which are related to the Bosnian war as well as other armed conflicts across the world. Furthermore, the Memory Modul has produced a handful of documentary films, including Greta by Haris Pašović, which documented the life of Greta Ferušić, a retired professor of architecture at the University of Sarajevo and survivor of Auschwitz and the Siege of Sarajevo.

== Festival venues ==
The principal venues of the Festival are:

- Kamerni teatar 55
- Sarajevo War Theatre
- Sarajevo National Theatre
- Bosnian National Theatre
- Sarajevo Youth Theatre
