= Eternal flame (Sarajevo) =

World War II memorial in Bosnia and Herzegovina

Eternal Flame Memorial Vječna vatra
- Bosnia and Herzegovina
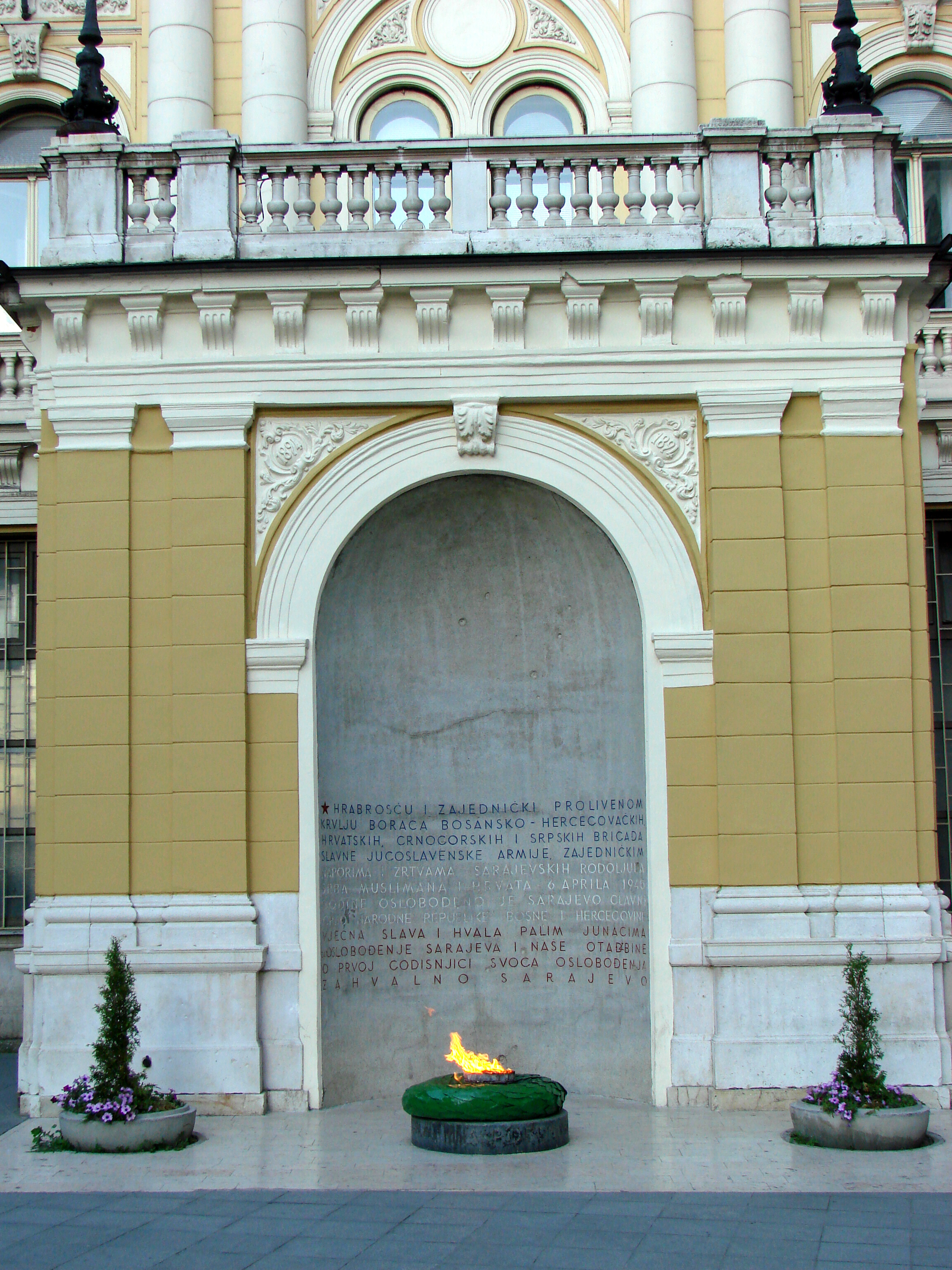
- The Eternal Flame in Sarajevo
- For The military and civilian victims of the Second World War in Sarajevo
- Established: 6 April 1946
- Location: 43.85881151263891°N 18.421871659343516°E

The Eternal Flame (Serbo-Croatian: Vječna vatra, Вјечна ватра) is an eternal flame type of memorial to the military and civilian victims of the Second World War in Sarajevo, Bosnia and Herzegovina. The memorial was dedicated on 6 April 1946, the first anniversary of the liberation of Sarajevo from the four-year-long occupation by Nazi Germany and the fascist Independent State of Croatia.

The memorial was designed by architect Juraj Neidhardt and is located in the former Landesbank building at the center of Sarajevo at the junction of Mula Mustafa Bašeskije, Titova and Ferhadija streets.

The attendees of the memorial come every April 6 to lay flowers and pay their respects in memory of liberators of the city and victims of both World War II and the 1992–1996 Siege of Sarajevo, which began around this date.

== Inscription ==
Bosnian	English
Hrabrošću i zajednički prolivenom krvlju boraca bosansko-hercegovačkih, hrvatskih, crnogorskih i srpskih brigada slavne Jugoslavenske armije, zajedničkim naporima i žrtvama sarajevskih rodoljuba Srba, Muslimana i Hrvata 6 aprila 1945 oslobođeno je Sarajevo glavni grad Narodne Republike Bosne i Hercegovine. Vječna slava i hvala palim junacima za oslobođenje Sarajeva i naše otadžbine. O prvoj godišnjici svoga oslobođenja— zahvalno Sarajevo.	With courage and the jointly spilled blood of the fighters of the Bosnian-Herzegovinian, Croatian, Montenegrin, and Serbian brigades of the glorious Yugoslav Army; with the joint efforts and sacrifices of Sarajevan patriots Serbs, Muslims and Croats on 6 April 1945 Sarajevo, the capital city of the People's Republic of Bosnia and Herzegovina was liberated. Eternal glory and gratitude to the fallen heroes for the liberation of Sarajevo and our homeland. On the first anniversary of its liberation— a grateful Sarajevo.
