= Mustafa Busuladžić =

Bosnian writer

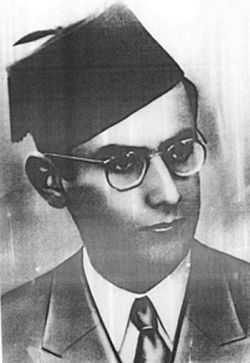
Mustafa Busuladžić

Mustafa Busuladžić (1 April 1914 – 29 June 1945) was a Bosnian Muslim writer, scientist, and one of the prominent Islamic intellectuals in the period between the two world wars. He was a member of the Young Muslims (Mladi muslimani) movement, as well as anti-Communist. In addition to his native Bosnian, he also spoke Arabic, Turkish, German, French and Italian.

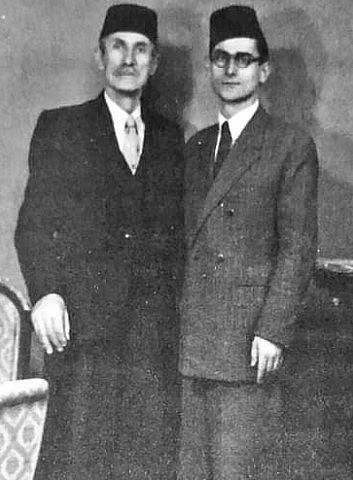
Mustafa Busuladzic with his father Smail Busuladzic.

== Biography ==
Busuladžić was born on 1 April 1914 in the village Gorica near Trebinje, son of Smail Busuladžić, a shopkeeper, and Emina. His siblings were brothers Murat (born 1912), Mahmut (born 1919) and Asim (born 1926, killed during World War II in June 1945), and sisters Dika (born 1916) and Remza (born 1929).

He attended the maktab and elementary school in his hometown, after which he went to Travnik where he enrolled in the Elči Ibrahim Paša Medresa. After one or two years spent in the Travnik madrasa, he moved to further education at Gazi Husrev-beg's Madrasa in Sarajevo where he graduated in 1936. As a student, he published his texts in Islamski glas, Novi Behar, Obzor, Svijest, El-Hidaja, Glasnik VIS-a, Naša domovina and other publications.

He was married to Zehra Šestić from Zenica. They had two children, Lejla (who died in the 2010s) and Muhamed, who was only five months old when his father was executed.

After completing the Madrasa, he enrolled at the Islamic Sharia School in Sarajevo, where he graduated in 1941. After that he spent two years in Rome at a postgraduate study in orientalism. Then he worked as an associate of Italian reviews Mondo Arabo and Oriente Moderno. He worked in Rome as a news translator and a radio station speaker. He was employed in Sarajevo as a professor at the Sharia Gymnasium, and he worked part-time at the Women's Madrasa, Real High School and Technical High School. He has written and translated much besides educational and pedagogical works.

At the time when the Young Muslims acted as a branch of El-Hidaje, an organization of the Islamic clergy of the Independent State of Croatia, Mustafa Busuladžić was their official president in Sarajevo (after Kasim Dobrača and at the proposal of Mehmed Handžić). Mustafa Busuladžić was one of the Muslim writers in Bosnia and Herzegovina, and his opus lists the booklet "Muslims in Soviet Russia" (Muslimani u Sovjetskoj Rusiji) describing the difficult situation of the Muslims in the Russian Empire that got even worse after the Bolsheviks came to power. In his review published in Osvit after the Jews' Persecution in Sarajevo, he wrote:

Kod nas su se ljudi borili protiv Židova i njihovih špekulacija, protiv njihovih prevara i izrabljivanja. Njih je nestalo iz čaršije, ali je u čaršiji ostao židovski duh špekulacije, podvaljivanja, nabijanja cijena i lihvarenja u tolikoj mjeri da pokvarenost stanovitih trgovaca, bez obzira na vjeru, zasjenjuje rad nestalih Židova.

— People among us fought against the Jews and their speculations, against their deception and exploitation. They disappeared from the čaršijas (market places), but in the čaršija remained Jewish spirit of the speculation, defection, price-bribing, and loyalty to the extent that the corruption of certain merchants, regardless of religion, overshadows the work of the missing Jews.

== Trial ==
Since Busuladžić was one opponent of communism, which he confirmed by the publication of works on Muslims in the Soviet Union, after the liberation of Sarajevo and the Communist's arrival, he was arrested in mid-April 1945. He was tried before the Military Court on 22–23 May in the then Osman-Pasha barracks. He was indicted as a collaborator of the occupier because of the cooperation with the Jerusalem Mufti and member of the SS Amin al-Husseini, and because he was a teacher at the school of the SS divisions. As evidence, the prosecutor filed the anti-communist brochure "Muslims in Soviet Russia", a copy of the counter-scripture letter of Mehmed Handžić, which was translated and handed to al-Husseini, a copy of the letter he handed over to the mufti for prisoners imprisoned in Zagreb, the article Our Tolerance published in Osvit indicating that the Jews are the common enemies of the Arabs, Muslims and Christians, and a greeting letter, written on May 11, 1941, at the ceremonial session of el-Hidaje addressed to the head of NDH Ante Pavelić, the Vice-President of the Government of the Independent State of Croatia, Osman-beg Kulenović, the Minister of Defense and the Minister for Counseling and Education Mile Budak and admiral Ademaga Mešić, as well as an anti-Serbian speech read out before the Emperor's Mosque in Sarajevo. The martial court trialled him together with Atif Hadžikadić, the together with the mayor he was sentenced to death by firing squad. The shooting was carried out at night in the Sarajevo settlement of Velešići behind the train station.

== Controversy ==
Today, one street in the settlement of Breka on Koševo is named after him. The street was previously named after the national hero of the SFRY, Fuad Midžić.

In 2017, the Dobroševići elementary school in the municipality of Novi Grad changed its name to the Public Institution "Mustafa Busuladžić" Primary School, which caused disagreement among the representatives of the local municipal assembly. The decision was condemned by the American embassy in Sarajevo, as well as the Israeli Embassy in Tirana.

== Bibliography ==
- Muslimani u Evropi - izabrani spisi, Sejtarija, 1997
- Muslimani u Rusiji, 1997
