= Islamic Declaration =

1970 essay by Alija Izetbegović

The Islamic Declaration (Bosnian: Islamska deklaracija) is an essay written by Alija Izetbegović published in 1970 in Sarajevo, SR Bosnia and Herzegovina, SFR Yugoslavia. It presents his views on Islam and modernization. The treatise attempts to reconcile Western-style progress with Islamic tradition and issues a call for "Islamic renewal". The work was later used against Izetbegović and other pan-Islamists in a 1983 trial in Sarajevo, which resulted in him being sentenced to 14 years' imprisonment. He was released after two years.

The declaration remains a source of controversy. Serb and Croatian leaderships during the breakup of Yugoslavia accused Izetbegović and his Party of Democratic Action (SDA) of Islamic fundamentalism and seeking to establish an Islamic state.

== Overview ==
The essay Islamic Declaration is described by John V. A. Fine as a 'theoretical' work on the question on whether Islam and an Islamic state could exist in a modern world, and by Kjell Magnusson as "in terms of genre ... a religious and moral-political essay ... discusses the predicament of Islam and Muslims in the contemporary world". Banac describes it as trying to conciliate Western-style progress with Islamic tradition.

== Standpoints ==
=== No modernization without roots in the Qur'an ===
The main idea is that the Qur'an allows modernization, but that it sets limits. To this end Izetbegović cited Atatürk's Turkey as a negative example of loss of Islamic roots, ending in economic stagnation, and Japan as a positive example, in which retaining most of its own culture proved compatible with modernization and economic growth.

==== Clerics and modernists ====
The thesis considers the "Islamic renewal" to be blocked by two forces, the "clerics" and the "modernists". Ulama, the class of learned scholars represent a degenerate Islam, which has turned religion into form without content, while modernist intellectuals try to popularise Westernised culture which is foreign to Islam and the intimate feelings of the broad masses. The Muslim masses therefore, lack the leaders and ideas which would awaken them from their lethargy, and there is a tragic distinction between the intelligentsia and ordinary people. It sees the need for a new brand of Muslim intellectuals, reborn in their own tradition.

=== The Islamic order ===
Izetbegović describes his envisioned Islamic order thus:

To the question, "What is a Muslim society?" our answer is a community made up of Muslims, and we consider that this answer says it all, or nearly so. The meaning of this definition is that there is no institutional, social or legal system that can exist separately from people who are its actors, of which we could say, "This is an Islamic system." No system is Islamic or Islamic per se. It is only so based on the people who make it.

He views the Islamic movement as moral rather than political, and defines it is an ideological avant-garde:

Only individuals who have been tested and trained, gathered together in a sound, homogeneous organization, can win the struggle for the Islamic order and the complete reconstruction of Islamic society. This organization bears no resemblance to a political party from the arsenal of a Western democracy; it is a movement founded on Islamic ideology, with clear criteria of moral and ideological belonging.

=== Islamic government ===
Izetbegović wrote that an Islamic government is not possible except in the context of an Islamic society, which can exist only when the absolute majority of the population is constituted by sincere and practicing Muslims. On this basis, it is impossible to theorize an Islamic government in Bosnia where Muslims, even only by name, are a minority.

The Islamic order can be realized only in the nations in which Muslims represent the majority of the population. Without this social premise, the Islamic order fall to be mere power (for the lack of the second element, the Islamic society) and can revert to tyranny.

One of the passages cited by critics J. Millard Burr and Robert O. Collins against Alija is the passage "Islamic movement must and start taking power as soon as it is morally and numerically strong enough to do so". Clinton Bennett however states that they do not the quote the passage on the same page that says "Islamic rebirth is first a revolution in education and only then in politics" or the passage on page 49 "the Islamic order can only be established in countries where Muslims represent the majority of the population" since "history does not relate any true revolution which came from power...all begin in education and meant in essence a moral summons" (page 53).

Bennett says that while Izetbgović did call for taking power, there is nothing resembling a call for taking extra-constitutional action. Izetbegović says on page 53 that one tyranny must not be replaced by another.

Other quotes from the book include:

Muslim nations will never accept anything that is explicitly against Islam, because Islam here is not merely a faith and the law, Islam has become love and compassion. One who rises against Islam will reap nothing but hate and resistance.

In perspective, there is but one way out in sight: creation and gathering of a new intelligence which thinks and feels along Islamic lines. This intelligence would then raise the flag of the Islamic order and together with the Muslim masses embark into action to implement this order.

The upbringing of the nation, and especially the mass media – the press, TV and film – should be in the hands of people whose Islamic moral and intellectual authority is undisputed.

He stated "Islamic society without an Islamic government is incomplete and impotent" and that "history does not know of a single truly Islamic movement which was not simultaneously a political movement".

Other theses of Izetbegović, which are categorized by some as belonging to Islamic fundamentalism and others as simple affirmations of orthodox faith", include the belief that an Islamic state should ban alcohol, pornography and prostitution, the vision of Islam not only as a private belief but as public lifestyle with a social and political dimension, and the transcendence of national borders by the brotherhood of the whole Islamic world, the Ummah.

=== Islamic renewal ===
The work discusses the difficult situation of Muslims in the contemporary world, that of "moral decay and humiliating stagnation", which should be thwarted with the necessary returning to the Qur'an and Islam. Izetbegović argued that there was a necessity for both religious and political revolution. The declaration explicitly states, "religious renewal has a clear priority". The starting point of the religious transformation will be Islam itself.

He cautioned that Islam is one thing and the historical record of Muslims another. Great damage had been done to Muslim people. He stated the renaissance would follow "from the principles and nature of Islam and not the dismal facts characteristics of Muslim world today". As a first step, he called for a moral revolution to bridge the gap between higher principles of Islam and the "disappointing behaviour of contemporary Muslims". After that, a political reform will follow. The heart of the political revolution will be the democratic exercise of power by the post-reform Muslim-majority.

Izetbegović purportedly did not reject Western civilization in itself, although he criticized what he regarded as the rapid coercive secularization of Turkey under Atatürk. Izetbegović raged against the "so-called progressives, Westernizers and modernizers" who want to implement the same policy in other countries.

Since its foundations Islam engaged, without prejudices, in studying and gathering of knowledge inherited by previous civilizations. We don't understand why today's Islam should take a different approach toward the conquests of the Euro-American civilization, with which it has so many contacts.

In his treatise, Islam between East and West, he reportedly praised Renaissance art, Christian morality, and Anglo-Saxon philosophy and social-democratic traditions.

As to his pan-Islamism, he wrote:

Islam has become love and compassion... He who rises against Islam will reap nothing but hate and resistance... In one of the theses for an Islamic order today we have stated that it is a natural function of the Islamic order to gather all Muslims and Muslim communities throughout the world into one. Under present conditions, this desire means a struggle for creating a great Islamic federation from Morocco to Indonesia, from the tropical Africa to the Central Asia.

==== Islam and modern day ====
Izetbegović's approach to Islamic law seems to be open since he thinks that Muslims do not have to be bound by past interpretations.

There are immutable Islamic principles which define the relationship between man and man, and between man and the community, but there are no fixed Islamic economic, social or political structure handed down once and for all. Islamic sources contain no description of such a system. The way in which Muslims will carry on an economy, organize society and rule in the future will therefore differ from the way in which they carried on an economy, organized society and ruled in the past. Every age and each generation has the task of finding new ways and means of implementing the basic messages of Islam, which are unchanging and eternal, in a world which is changing and eternal.

=== Non-Islamic institutions ===
The treatise considers that for the main principle of Islamic order, the unity of faith and politics, leads among others to the following "first and foremost conclusion":

There is no peace or coexistence between the Islamic faith and non-Islamic social and political institutions. The failure of these institutions to function and the instability of these regimes in Muslim countries, manifest in frequent changes and coups d'état, is most often the consequence of their a priori opposition to Islam, as the fundamental and foremost feeling of the people in those countries. Claiming its right to order its own world alone, Islam clearly rules out the right and the possibility of the application of any foreign ideology in its own region. There is, therefore, no lay principle, and the state ought to be a reflection of and to support the moral concepts of the religion.

Noel Malcolm states that it only referred to countries where the majority of population was practising Muslim, stating that the "entire discussion of the nature of an Islamic political system is inapplicable to Bosnia. Vjekoslav Perica meanwhile states that it called on Muslims to demand a state of their own, once they became the majority in a country, organized according to Islamic laws and norms.

The Islamic order envisaged in it endeavours to prohibit "alcoholic intoxication of the people", public and secret prostitution, all forms of pornography, casinos, night and dancing clubs as well as other forms of entertainment incompatible with Islamic moral precepts.

=== Minorities ===
The treatise states:

Islamic order can be realized only in countries in which the Muslims represent the majority of the population. Without this majority, Islamic order is reduced to state power alone (because the other element - Islamic society - is missing) and can turn itself to violence. Non-Muslim minorities within the confines of an Islamic state, provided they are loyal, enjoy religious liberties and all protection. Muslim minorities within the confines of non-Islamic [state] communities, provided their religious liberties, normal life, and development are guaranteed, are loyal to - and obliged to carry out all obligations to - that community, except those that harm Islam and Muslims.

Aleksander Pavkovic states that given the treatise's insistence on introduction of Islamic law, it is not clear whether it envisaged any political participation of non-Muslims in an Islamic state, its application of Islamic legal and moral precepts would obviously restrict non-Muslims' civil rights and liberties.

=== The Republican Principle ===
Although details of Islamic political organisation are left quite vague, three republican principles of political order are deemed to be essential which are: (1) the electability of the head of the state, (2) the accountability of the head of the state to the people, (3) the obligation of solving communally general and social issues.

Apart from affairs of property, Islam does not recognize any principle of inheritance, nor any power with absolute prerogative. To recognize the absolute power of Allah means an absolute denial of any other almighty authority (Qur'an 7/3, 12/40). "Any submission of a creature which includes a lack of submission to the Creator is forbidden" (Muhammad, peace be upon him). In the history of the first, and perhaps so far the only authentic Islamic order - the era of the first four caliphs, we can clearly see three essential aspects of the republican principle of power: (1) an elective head of state, (2) the responsibility of the head of state towards the people and (3) the obligation of both to work on public affairs and social matters. The latter is explicitly supported by the Qur'an (3/159, 42/38). The first four rulers in Islamic history were neither kings or emperors. They were chosen by the people. The inherited caliphate was an abandonment of the electoral principle, a clearly defined Islamic political institution.

== Aftermath and legacy assessment ==
=== Trials ===
Hasan Čengić, Alija Izetbegović and Omer Behmen were arrested in April 1983 and tried before a Sarajevo court for a variety of charges called "offenses as principally hostile activity inspired by Muslim nationalism, association for purposes of hostile activity and hostile propaganda", along with ten other Bosniak activists. Izetbegović was sentenced to 14 years, then five, but was released from prison after serving two years. The charge was "attack against socialism [and] willingness to build an Islamic State in Bosnia". All were pardoned by 1988.

The verdict was strongly criticized by Western human rights organizations, including Amnesty International and Helsinki Watch, which claimed the case was based on "communist propaganda", and the accused were not charged with either using or advocating violence. The following May, the Bosnian Supreme Court conceded the point with an announcement that "some of the actions of the accused did not have the characteristics of criminal acts" and reduced Izetbegović's sentence to twelve years. In 1988, as communist rule faltered, he was pardoned and released after almost five years in prison. His health had suffered serious damage.

=== Legacy ===
The eruption of the war strengthened Bosnian Muslim identity. In 1993 "Bosniak" was adopted as a name for the Bosnian Muslim nationality, at the 1st Congress of Bosniak-Muslim Intellectuals, to replace imposed "Muslims" label. The Dayton Agreement ended the war and brought about a new constitution for Bosnia and Herzegovina, now two entities, with the majority Bosniak and Croat-inhabited Federation of Bosnia and Herzegovina, and the majority Serb-inhabited Republika Srpska.

=== Assessment in scholarship ===
Bosnia and Herzegovina was never mentioned explicitly in the text. Izetbegović himself insisted many times that the statements about the creation of an Islamic state were hypothetical and were not to be the applied to the situation in Bosnia.
Political establishment of Croatia and Serbia, with explicit ideological backing from academia and considerable coverage by media, accused Izetbegović and his political party, the SDA, for seeking to establish an Islamic state or some kind of Muslim republic in Bosnia, often quoting his essay arguing how declaration is indicative of an intent, or as an open statement of Islamic fundamentalism, or as evidence of Islamism. Passages from the declaration were frequently quoted by many prominent political figures as well, such as Franjo Tuđman, Radovan Karadžić, Dobrica Ćosić, Vojislav Šešelj, among others. In the eyes of the Serbs, Izetbegović wanted to transform Bosnia and Herzegovina into an Islamic state.

The Declaration designated Pakistan as a model country to be emulated by Muslim revolutionaries worldwide. One of the passages that was in particular picked out by his opponents was, "There can be no peace or coexistence between the Islamic faith and non-Islamic social and political institutions...the state should be an expression of religion and should support its moral concepts."

== Sources ==
- Baker, Raymond William (2015). One Islam, Many Muslim Worlds: Spirituality, Identity, and Resistance across Islamic Lands. Oxford University Press. pp. 94, 125–130. ISBN 978-0-19-984648-1.
- Banac, Ivo (1996). "Bosnian Muslims: From Religious Community to Socialist Nationhood and Postcommunist Statehood, 1918-1992". In Pinson, Mark; Mottahedeh, Roy (eds.). The Muslims of Bosnia-Herzegovina: Their Historic Development from the Middle Ages to the Dissolution of Yugoslavia. Boston: Harvard CMES. ISBN 0-932885-12-8.
- Bougarel, Xavier (2017). Islam and Nationhood in Bosnia-Herzegovina: Surviving Empires. Bloomsbury Publishing. p. 96. ISBN 978-1-350-00361-3.
- Burg, Steven L.; Shoup, Paul S. (2015). Ethnic Conflict and International Intervention: Crisis in Bosnia-Herzegovina, 1990-93: Crisis in Bosnia-Herzegovina, 1990-93. Taylor & Francis. ISBN 978-1-317-47101-1.
- Fine, John V.A. (2002). "The Various Faiths in the History of Bosnia". In Shatzmiller, Maya (ed.). Islam and Bosnia: Conflict Resolution and Foreign Policy in Multi-ethnic States. McGill-Queen's Press - MQUP. pp. 3–23. ISBN 978-0-7735-2413-2.
- Kostić, Roland (2007). "Nation-building from the Ottomans to Dayton". Ambivalent Peace: External Peacebuilding Threatened Identity and Reconciliation in Bosnia and Herzegovina. Ambivalent Peace. pp. 78–. ISBN 978-91-506-1950-8.
- Malcolm, Noel (1996) [1994]. Bosnia: A Short History (2nd ed.). New York University Press. ISBN 0-8147-5561-5.
- Motyl, Alexander J. (2001). Encyclopedia of Nationalism, Volume II. Academic Press. pp. 56–57. ISBN 0-12-227230-7.
- Magnusson, Kjell (2012). "Bosnia and Herzegovina". In Svanberg, Ingvar; Westerlund, David (eds.). Islam Outside the Arab World. Routledge. pp. 295–314. ISBN 978-1-136-11330-7.
- Velikonja, Mitja (2003). Religious Separation and Political Intolerance in Bosnia-Herzegovina. Texas A&M University Press. pp. 278–. ISBN 978-1-60344-724-9.
- Perica, Vjekoslav (2002). "Balkan Idols: Religion and Nationalism in Yugoslav States". Oxford University Press. p. 77. ISBN 978-0-19-517429-8.
- Fowkes, Ben (6 March 2002). "Ethnicity and Ethnic Conflict in the Post-Communist World". Springer Science+Business Media. ISBN 9781403914309.
- Blitz, Brad K. (12 October 2006). War and Change in the Balkans: Nationalism, Conflict and Cooperation. Cambridge University Press. p. 34. ISBN 9780521677738.
- Schindler, John R. (2007). Unholy Terror: Bosnia, Al-Qaida, and the Rise of Global Jihad. Zenith Imprint.
