= Sarajevo Youth Theatre =

Children's theatre organization in Sarajevo

- Sarajevo Youth Theatre
- Interactive map of Sarajevo Youth Theatre
- Address: Kulovića 8
- Location: Sarajevo, Bosnia and Herzegovina
- Coordinates: 43°51′29″N 18°25′15″E

Construction
- Opened: 1950
- Reopened: 1997
- Rebuilt: 2016

Website
- pozoristemladih.ba

The Sarajevo Youth Theatre (Bosnian: Pozorište mladih Sarajevo; Cyrillic: Позориште младих Сарајево) is a children's and youth theatre in Sarajevo, Bosnia and Herzegovina. It was founded in 1950 under the name Pioneer Theatre. It is the largest theatre of its kind in the country.

== History ==
After the Second World War the new Yugoslav communist authorities started a large programme of cultural and artistic expansion. In 1950 two theatres aimed at children were established in Sarajevo: the Pioneer Theatre and the Puppet Theatre. The former did not have its own professional ensemble, but would book actors from more established Yugoslav theatres for individual productions. The latter, managed by Adolf Pomezni, mostly focused on marionette-based productions. In 1961 the Pioneer Theatre, managed at the time by founder of the MESS International Theatre Festival Jurislav Korenić, formed its first professional ensemble and changed its name to the Sarajevo Youth Theatre.

In 1977 the Puppet Theatre was fused with the Sarajevo Youth Theatre. At this time notable productions included J.Skupa-K.Venig's Srećko među bubama, Josip Vandot's Kekec, Pinocchio by D.Bibanović, Alice in Wonderland by L.Paljetka, Šimić's Palčić Dugonja and Cinderella, D.Todorović's Na Lutkarskoj, Shakespeare's The Tempest and The Comedy of Errors, Aristophanes's The Birds, Homer's Odyssey, Alfred Jarry's Ubu Roi, Držić's Novela od Stanca, Eugène Ionesco's Exit the King, Kurićeva Beauty and the Beast, Lukić's I opet Nusic and Bašeskija, san o Sarajevu and many others.

With the start of the Siege of Sarajevo and the Bosnian war in 1992 the theatre continued to operate and, in cooperation with the MESS International Theatre Festival and a hand full of theatre professionals that included Haris Pašović and Gradimir Gojer, continued to host theatre productions. Numerous renowned directors, including Susan Sontag, directed productions in the theatre during the Siege. It was commercially reopened in 1997 and was rebuilt in 2016.
