= Hasan Čengić =

Bosnian politician (1957–2021)

Deputy of the Federal Minister of Defence
- In office 31 May 1994 – 4 November 1996
- Prime Minister: Haris Silajdžić Izudin Kapetanović
- Minister: Vladimir Šoljić
- Preceded by: Office established
- Succeeded by: Sakib Mahmuljin

Personal details
- Born: 30 August 1957 Foča-Ustikolina, Bosnia and Herzegovina, Yugoslavia
- Died: 7 November 2021 (aged 64) Sarajevo, Bosnia and Herzegovina
- Citizenship: Bosnia and Herzegovina
- Party: Party of Democratic Action
- Spouse: Fahira Čengić
- Relatives: Adil Zulfikarpašić (cousin) Rasim Delić (brother-in-law) Sulejman Ugljanin (brother-in-law)
- Nickname: Bosnian Lion

Hasan Čengić (Bosnian pronunciation: [hǎsan t͡ʃěŋgit͡ɕ]; 30 August 1957 – 7 November 2021) was a Bosniak politician who served as Deputy Prime Minister and Deputy Defence Minister of the Federation of Bosnia and Herzegovina. During the Bosnian War, Čengić was the main fundraiser and weapons buyer for Alija Izetbegović's administration.

Regarded as a Muslim hardliner and one of the most influential people in Sarajevo, Čengić was a proponent of Iran's influence in Bosnia and Herzegovina.

== Early life ==
Čengić was born in Odžak, Foča-Ustikolina, SR Bosnia and Herzegovina, SFR Yugoslavia, present-day Bosnia and Herzegovina to father Halid and mother Merjema née Lutvikadić. He was a distant cousin of the Bosnian Muslim politician Adil Zulfikarpašić.

As a young imam, Čengić led a group called Tabački Masjid, which condemned discotheques and mixed marriages and advocated veiling of women as well as the prohibition of alcohol. For Loftus, Čengić was a sympathiser of the Iranian revolution who "perceived a great deal of potential in a new internationalism" and who advocated a pan-Islamic course for his community.

In 1981, Čengić published an article in the magazine "Glasnik" about the practice of Sharia law. In the article, Čengić investigated the application of Sharia in the Islamic world and wrote about Iran that it shows "a growing tendency to break with Western models and a determination to return to their own laws, culture and civilisation". In the article, along with Jaafar Nimeiry of Sudan and Muhammad Zia-ul-Haq of Pakistan, he relied heavily on Ruhollah Khomeini, quoting him extensively. Loftus writes that in the article, Čengić sees the Iranian revolution as "the most representative moment of the strength of the new Muslim coalition alongside 1973 oil embargo". In the article, Čengić holds the view that "Muslims have the space, population, dynamism, strength, energy and money," concluding that there is no reason why they cannot become "the master of tomorrow's world". Loftus further writes that, although Čengić doesn't mention Yugoslav Muslims in the article, he "implicitly made space for his own community" in "a potential coalition of Islamic "masters of tomorrow".

=== Sarajevo process ===
Čengić was a member of the Young Muslims, an Islamist organisation that was led by Alija Izetbegović. The members of the organisation, including both Izetbegović and Čengić, were trialed in 1983. Hamdija Pozderac, the president of the League of Communists of Bosnia and Herzegovina, said the organisation was working towards pan-Islamism which would lead to "ethnically cleansed Bosnia and Herzegovina" and that they were looking for cooperation with the Muslim world, Iran especially. The prosecutors argued that the accused identified themselves with the Islamic revolution and that some of them secretly went to Teheran to mark the anniversary of the revolution, while the writings of the accused were used to underline these connections, and especially the Islamic Declaration authored by Izetbegović. At the end of the trial, each accused was sentenced to 14 years in prison for various Muslim nationalist activities.

== Bosnian War ==
During the Bosnian War, Alija Izetbegović appointed Čengić a chief fundraiser and weapons buyer, tasked with negotiating clandestine arms deals. Čengić traveled to foreign countries to negotiate the supply of weapons to Bosniak forces, including Iran. For his frequent travels to the Islamic countries he was nicknamed "the flying imam". He was also a member of the advisory board of the Third World Relief Agency (TWRA) which is assumed to have brought $350 million to the government of the Republic of Bosnia and Herzegovina during the war period from 1992 to 1995, at least half of which was used for arms smuggling. Most of the money came from the countries of the Middle East, including Iran, and especially Saudi Arabia. Donations also came from Turkey, Sudan, Brunei, Malaysia and Pakistan.

In the second half of 1991, the Party of Democratic Action (SDA) was very active in preparations for war, which the party leadership knew was inevitable. In June 1991, before Slovenia and Croatia declared independence and ten months before conflicts broke out in Bosnia and Herzegovina, the SDA decided to form its own paramilitary, the Patriotic League with Čengić, then a 43-year-old imam, as its head. Since the Patriotic League was in need of weapons, ammunition, supplies and uniforms, Čengić visited the Islamic countries for support.

Čengić, together with his father, was responsible for the maintenance of the Army of the Republic of Bosnia and Herzegovina (ARBiH), supply, traffic control, transport, and medical and veterinary services. These positions allowed them great influence, which was strongly used. Čengić preferred buttoned uniforms without a collar, modeled after the uniforms of the Iranians, and had a reputation as a tough man.

The Slobodna Bosna newspaper argued that Čengić was the business partner of Russian arms dealer and former KGB officer Viktor Bout, otherwise known as "the Merchant of Death". In May 2006, when 200,000 AK-47 assault rifles went missing in transit from Bosnia and Herzegovina to Iraq, one of Bout's airlines was the carrier.

According to Austrian police, he was on the supervisory board of the Third World Relief Agency (TWRA), a Sudan-based, phony humanitarian organization.

== Post-war ==
=== Ministry of Defence ===
After the signing of the Washington Agreement in March 1994 and the creation of the joint Bosniak-Croat Federation of Bosnia and Herzegovina, Čengić served in the Ministry of Defence of the Federation of Bosnia and Herzegovina as a deputy of Vladimir Šoljić, a Bosnian Croat appointed to the post of a minister of defence.

Čengić was known as a hardliner Muslim, with close ties to a more moderate Izetbegović. Čengić had close ties to Iran and the US Ambassador in Sarajevo James W. Pardew regarded him as an agent of Iran. During the war, the United States ignored Iran's arms supply. However, in the post-war period, the removal of Iranian fighters and influential persons was a non-negotiable condition for the implementation of the Train and Equip Program (T&E).

During the war, there were hundreds of mujahideen from all over the Muslim world on the side of the Bosniaks. Their military value was doubtful, and many of them fought as part of the 4th, 7th and 8th Muslim brigades, considered among the best Bosniak units. At the same time, around 1,500 Iranian Revolutionary Guard fighters and advisers supported the Bosniak side. Iran maintained a large embassy in Sarajevo and provided direct financial support to the government as well as a security assistance program that included arming and military training of Bosniak soldiers in Iran. This is why many media, critical of the T&E, criticized it for the possibility of arming and training Islamic extremists. This was the reason for Pardew and his team to try to eliminate the Iranian influence from Bosnia and Herzegovina and save the credibility of T&E.

On the other hand, Čengić stood firmly by Iran and harshly criticized the United States. T&E progressed with occasional setbacks. Bosniaks who were sympathetic to Iran criticised T&E and considered Iran's support more reliable. The Croatian media reported that Čengić launched an anti-American campaign and complained that the weapons delivered through T&E were outdated. The SDA-controlled Sarajevo newspaper "Ljiljan" published an interview with Iranian diplomat Seyyed Mohsen Rasidouleslami, who revealed that in case the T&E fails, Iran is waiting to train and arm Bosniak forces.

In June 1996, trying to push through the Defense Law in the Federation of Bosnia and Herzegovina, Pardew, seeing Čengić as a major obstacle to T&E and as a representative of Iran, informed Izetbegović that keeping people like Čengić would lead to isolationism and the partition of Bosnia and Herzegovina. He also asked Izetbegović that all Mujahideen-oriented Iranians leave the country. The media increased the political pressure covering Iranian influence in Bosnia and Herzegovina. Already on June 26, Pardew presented the information that Iranian and other foreign fighters had been expelled and that there were less than 70 of them left in Bosnia and Herzegovina who were married to locals. President Clinton did not oppose their stay and informed Congress that the Iranians, except for the embassy staff, had left Bosnia and Herzegovina.

However, removing Čengić was significantly more difficult. The situation escalated by October 1996 when the United States was supposed to deliver over 40 tons of weapons to Bosnia and Herzegovina via the Croatian port of Ploče. Pardew insisted that the Secretary of State Warren Christopher and Defense Secretary William J. Perry sign a letter demanding the removal of Čengić and that the same be delivered to Izetbegović. Pardrew handed this signed letter to Izetbegović on 22 September as an ultimatum. The insistence on Čengić's removal caused great political difficulties in which high-ranking officials of the American, Bosnian-Herzegovinian and Croatian governments were involved. While Izetbegović was considering the ultimatum, the T&E was stopped, and the ship that delivered a large amount of weapons stood still in the Adriatic Sea in front of the port of Ploče from 24 October onwards. Pardrew believed that stopping the supply of weapons was necessary in order for the Americans to maintain leverage over Izetbegović. He also influenced the American officials meeting with Izetbegović to persuade him to cut ties with Čengić.

Izetbegović hesitated to cut ties with Čengić. He tried to convince him to resign as Minister of Defence in order to appoint him to a more influential post. However, Čengić, using his strong influence, resisted the removal and publicly accused the United States of interfering in the appointment and removal of officials of another state. Izetbegović eventually agreed to fire Čengić on the condition that Bosnian Croat Minister Šoljić also leave office. Thus, Izetbegović aimed to portray as if both men failed, instead of singling out the Bosniak minister. Pardew accepted Izetbegović's proposal and passed it on to Krešimir Zubak, the Croatian member of the BiH Presidency. The Croatian side accepted this offer, and Čengić was dismissed from the post on 4 November 1996. He was replaced by Sakib Mahmuljin.

=== Ministry of Displaced Persons and Refugees ===
After being dismissed from the Ministry of Defence, Čengić was appointed Minister of Displaced Persons and Refugees. In this position, Čengić took care of Bosniak refugees and performed his duties keeping in mind their deployment in case of the outbreak of a new war. However, in August 1997, ten T-55 tanks from Egypt were to arrive in Bosnia and Herzegovina, which Čengić bought at the end of the war. This delivery took place without the knowledge of the T&E task force and indicated that Čengić was cooperating with Bosniak officials in the Ministry of Defence. The task force intervened and prevented the tanks from landing. The media expressed fear of the secret arms trade and Iranian influence. The task force used the situation to show that the United States was in control and to point out the danger that Čengić would represent for Bosniaks. Izetbegović's administration, with the aim of mitigating the damage caused by Čengić, began closer cooperation with T&E, and Čengić did not further disrupt the flow of T&E.

He served as a member of parliament from 1998 to 2002.

He served as president of the Parliament of the Islamic Community in Bosnia and Herzegovina from 2015 until 2019, having lost re-election in 2018.

Bosniak political commentator Avdo Avdić wrote that Čengić was the leader of one of the four Bosniak political clans, extracting his influence solely from the Islamic Community of Bosnia and Herzegovina. Avdić wrote that Čengić also controlled the Party of Democratic Activity (A-SDA), an SDA-splinter party once prominent in the Una-Sana Canton and the so-called "Malaysia" sub-clan, which itself controls the People and Justice (NiP) party as well as Al Jazeera Balkans. The "Malaysia" sub-clan, according to Advić, is led by Amer Bukvić, the CEO of BBI Bank.

Čengić died on 7 November 2021, at the age of 64.
