= Young Muslims (Yugoslavia) =

Yugoslav Islamist organization

- Mladi muslimani
- Founded: 1939, reestablished in 1991
- Founder: Esad Karađozović; Tarik Muftić; Emin Granov; Husref Bašagić
- Founded at: Sarajevo, Bosnia, Kingdom of Yugoslavia
- Dissolved: 1949
- Type: Religious movement
- Legal status: Active
- Locations: Bosnia and Herzegovina; Sandžak
- Official language: Bosnian
- Key people: Alija Izetbegović; Mustafa Busuladžić; Omer Behmen
- Website: mladimuslimani.ba

Young Muslims (Serbo-Croatian: Mladi muslimani) was a Bosnian Muslim organisation that was established in 1939 in the Kingdom of Yugoslavia, and was active during World War II in the Independent State of Croatia and after the war in the Socialist Federal Republic of Yugoslavia. The organisation operated as an underground network in the Socialist Republic of Bosnia and Herzegovina. Eventually, it disappeared after its leadership was arrested by the communist Yugoslav authorities in 1949. Although ideologically pan-Islamist, the Young Muslims had a strong nationalistic component, advocating the autonomy of a Muslim-dominated Bosnia and Herzegovina.

== History ==
=== World War II ===
At the end of 1930s, educated Muslim youth established religious organizations Trezvenost (English: "Sobriety") in Sarajevo and Ihvan (English: "Brothers") in Mostar. As the organisations politicised, they came close together to be united into the Young Muslims organisation. They also established a third branch in Zagreb. Young Muslims resembled other Pan-Islamist movements of the time, both sociologically and ideologically. They were characterized by its opposition to reformism.

Given that the Young Muslims were founded just before the collapse of the Kingdom of Yugoslavia and that shortly after Bosnia and Herzegovina became part of the newly established Independent State of Croatia, an Axis puppet state led by the Croatian fascist Ustaše, Young Muslims tried to offer pan-Islamism as a response to an identity crisis of Bosnian Muslims.

Due to shared opposition to reforms, Young Muslims have been closely linked to the El-Hidaje association. To avoid being abolished or merged into a Ustaše organisation, Young Muslims transformed into the youth branch of El-Hidaje. With time, Young Muslims expanded their network and managed to cover most of the towns in Bosnia and Herzegovina.

Young Muslims engaged in two types of activities. On the one hand, within El-Hidaje, they organised religious activities, including meetings, congregational prayers, and celebrations of Muhammad's birthday. On the other hand, they participated in the charitable organization Merhamet (English: "Charity") and took care of Muslim refugees from eastern Bosnia and Herzegovina.

Ustaše led the policy of Croatisation of Bosnian Muslims who were portrayed as the "Croats of the Muslim faith", a policy supported by the leadership of the Yugoslav Muslim Organization led by Džafer Kulenović. At the same time, Bosnian Muslims were victims of the Chetnik massacres, which were also partly a reaction to the repressive Ustaše policies against ethnic Serbs. Therefore, a part of Bosnian Muslims wanted to distance themselves from the Ustaše, so several resolutions were adopted at the initiative of El-Hidaja condemning the Ustaše policies.

Young Muslims got involved in disseminating such resolutions and joined their demands for the autonomy of Bosnia and Herzegovina. With the support of the Grand Mufti of Jerusalem, Amin al-Husseini, their needs were presented to Nazi German authorities in the form of a memorandum where they offered the support of Bosnian Muslims in exchange for autonomy under the direct patronage of the Third Reich. Although this initiative remained without results, it led to the formation of the predominantly Muslim Waffen-SS Handschar Division, to which many Young Muslims joined. At the end of the war, however, the majority of the division joined the communist Yugoslav Partisans led by Josip Broz Tito.

=== Post-war ===
The Yugoslav Partisans won the war, and the Communist Party of Yugoslavia took over the newly established Socialist Federal Republic of Yugoslavia. The communist Yugoslav authorities abolished El-Hidaje altogether, and the Young Muslims afterwards became a clandestine and completely autonomous organisation. They re-established themselves around the three founding groups in Sarajevo, Mostar, and Zagreb. Later, the Young Muslims spread to around thirty small or bigger towns and many other villages in Bosnia and Herzegovina and outside it.

World War II and the official atheism of the new communist government led to further politicisation and radicalisation of Young Muslims. The brochure entitled "How will we fight?" outlined six basic post-war goals of the Young Muslims, among which was “the establishment of Islamic society in the Balkans; the establishment of Islamic order; and liberation and the political and spiritual unification of the Muslim world into an immense Islamic state or union of states”.

After the war, Bosnian Muslims found their interests threatened by the policies of the communist Yugoslav authorities. Namely, the communist Yugoslavs attacked the privileges established by the Statute on Autonomy of 1909, adopted while Bosnia and Herzegovina was part of Austria-Hungary. In 1947, the communists nationalized waqf (religious endowments) and sharia courts were abolished. The system of religious education was gradually abolished from 1947 to 1952. The law enacted on 28 September 1950 prohibited the veiling of Muslim women. Moreover, the Cold War intensified fears of an armed conflict in Bosnia and Herzegovina.

The branch of Young Muslims in Mostar, therefore, issued a proclamation in which they designated communism as the greatest enemy. At the same time, their proclamation calls for a fight against the new Yugoslav authorities. Young Muslims were critical of the Yugoslav Muslim Organization's pre-war strategy, the secular intelligentsia of Bosnia and Herzegovina, and the compromises with the communist Yugoslav authorities. They declared themselves an "organisation of education and struggle" in what they called the "days of jihad". Unlike the group in Mostar, which to some extent managed to spread to the rural population and make preparations for armed struggle, the rest of the Young Muslims were very limited in their activities. Their activity was focused on the education of urban youth and their recruitment, the expansion of informal networks, and cultural activities with the aim of “re-Islamizing” the Bosnian Muslim community.

Although Young Muslims advocated in principle for a hypothetical pan-Islamic state, the work of Young Muslims was concentrated on the overthrow and destruction of the existing state of communist Yugoslavia in Bosnia and Herzegovina and the creation of an autonomous Muslim-dominated Bosnia and Herzegovina. Such action was more nationalist than pan-Islamist. This was also reflected in the attitude of Young Muslims towards the Muslim world. For example, their support for the creation of Pakistan as a state with a national identity that stems from a religious identity under the leadership of the nationalist Muslim League of Muhammad Ali Jinnah, notwithstanding the criticism the Muslim League received from the pan-Islamist Jamaat-e-Islami of Abul A'la Maududi.

The first arrests of Young Muslims occurred in March 1946 in Sarajevo. Among the arrested were Nedžib Šaćirbegović, Alija Izetbegović, and Ešref Čampara. Each received a heavy prison sentence. Another wave of arrests occurred in 1947 and 1948 across Bosnia and Herzegovina. Nevertheless, the organisation continued to develop. However, with Tito–Stalin split, which was a result of the culmination of a conflict between the political leaderships of Yugoslavia and the Soviet Union, Young Muslims suffered greatly. The principal leaders of the organisation in Sarajevo, Mostar, and Zagreb were arrested. Four of them – Hasan Biber, Halid Kajtaz, Omer Stupac, and Nusret Fazlibegović – received death sentences after a trial that was held in August 1949 in Sarajevo. After losing its leadership, Young Muslims soon disappeared.
