= Omer Behmen =

Bosnian politician

- Born: 10 June 1922; Mostar, Kingdom of Yugoslavia
- Died: 23 April 2009 (aged 86); Sarajevo, Bosnia and Herzegovina

Omer Behmen (10 June 1922 – 23 April 2009) was a Bosnian politician. He was one of the closest associates of Alija Izetbegović, the first president of Bosnia and Herzegovina. Behmen was also one of the founders of the Party of Democratic Action political party.

== Imprisonment ==
In April 1983, Behmen and twelve other Bosniak activists (including future president Alija Izetbegović, Melika Salihbegović, Edhem Bičakčić, Mustafa Spahić and Hasan Čengić) were tried before a Sarajevo court for a variety of charges called "offences as principally hostile activity inspired by Muslim nationalism, association for purposes of hostile activity and hostile propaganda". All of those tried were convicted and Behmen was sentenced to twelve years in prison.

The verdict was strongly criticized by Western human rights organisations, including Amnesty International and Helsinki Watch, which claimed that the case was based on "communist propaganda", and the accused were not charged with either using or advocating violence. In 1988, as communist rule faltered, he was pardoned and released after almost five years in prison.
