= Marshal Tito street (Sarajevo) =

Street in Sarajevo, Bosnia and Herzegovina

- Tito's street
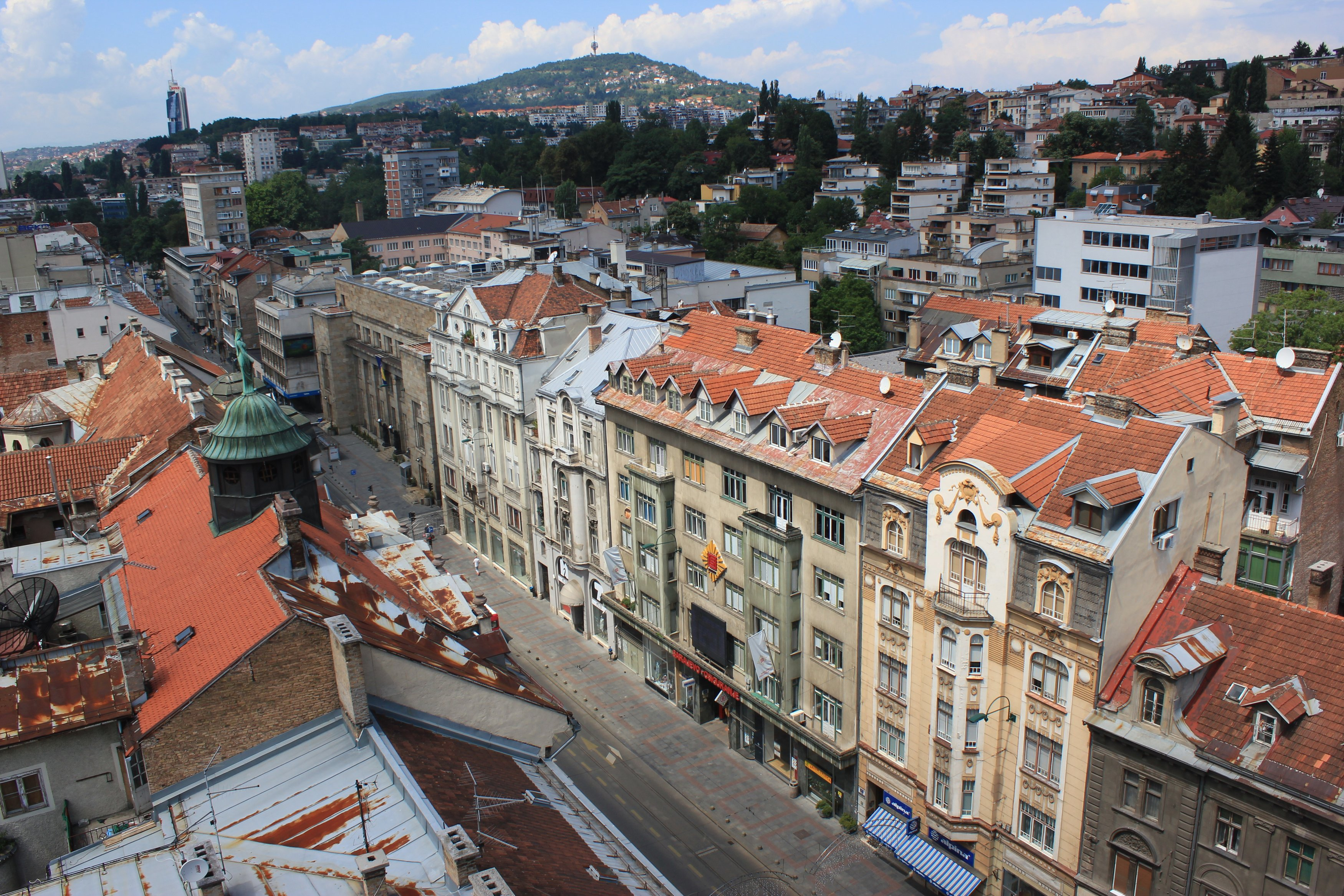
- Marshal Tito street in 2015
- Interactive map of Marshal Tito street
- Native name: Ulica Maršala Tita, Titova ulica (Bosnian)
- Former names: Ćemaluša, Franz Ferdinand street, Alexander Karađorđević street, Alexander I Karađorđević street, Ante Pavelić street
- Length: 1.3 km (0.81 mi)
- Coordinates: 43°51′30.56″N 18°24′48.1″E
- East: Mula Mustafa Bašeskija street and Ferhadija street
- West: Zmaj od Bosne street

Marshal Tito street, or Tito's street, is one of the main streets in Sarajevo, located in the Centar Municipality. The street is named after Josip Broz Tito, the former President of Yugoslavia.

Marshal Tito street connects Mula Mustafa Bašeskija street and Ferhadija street on the east and Zmaj od Bosne street on the west. Through this street lies the main route of Sarajevo trams.

== History of name ==
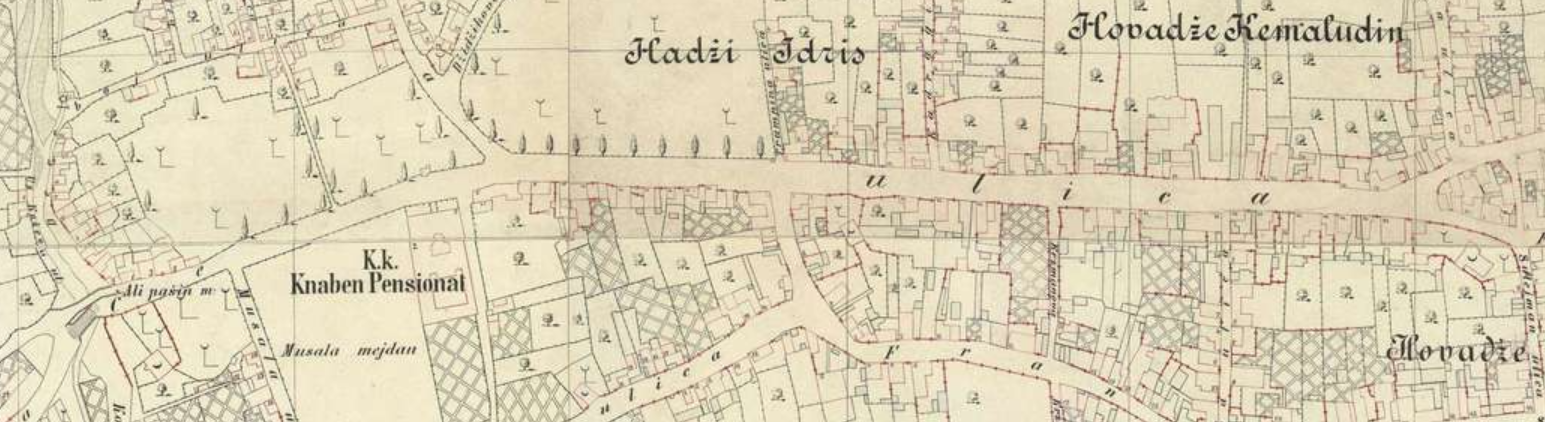
The area of Titova in 1882

After the Austro-Hungarian occupation of Bosnia and Herzegovina, the section from Koševski Potok to Baščaršija was called Ćemaluša, but was renamed after Franz Ferdinand following his assassination.

A new street was laid out in January 1919, between Marijin Dvor and Baščaršija. First it was named after Alexander Karađorđević, and in 1921 after Aleksandar I Karađorđević. From 1941 to 1945, it was named after Ante Pavelić.

Its current name the street has had since 6 April 1945. In 1993, the street was bisected: The part from Marijin Dvor to the Eternal flame remained Marshal Tito street, but the part that continues on to Baščaršija became Mula Mustafe Bašeskije street.

== Significant buildings ==
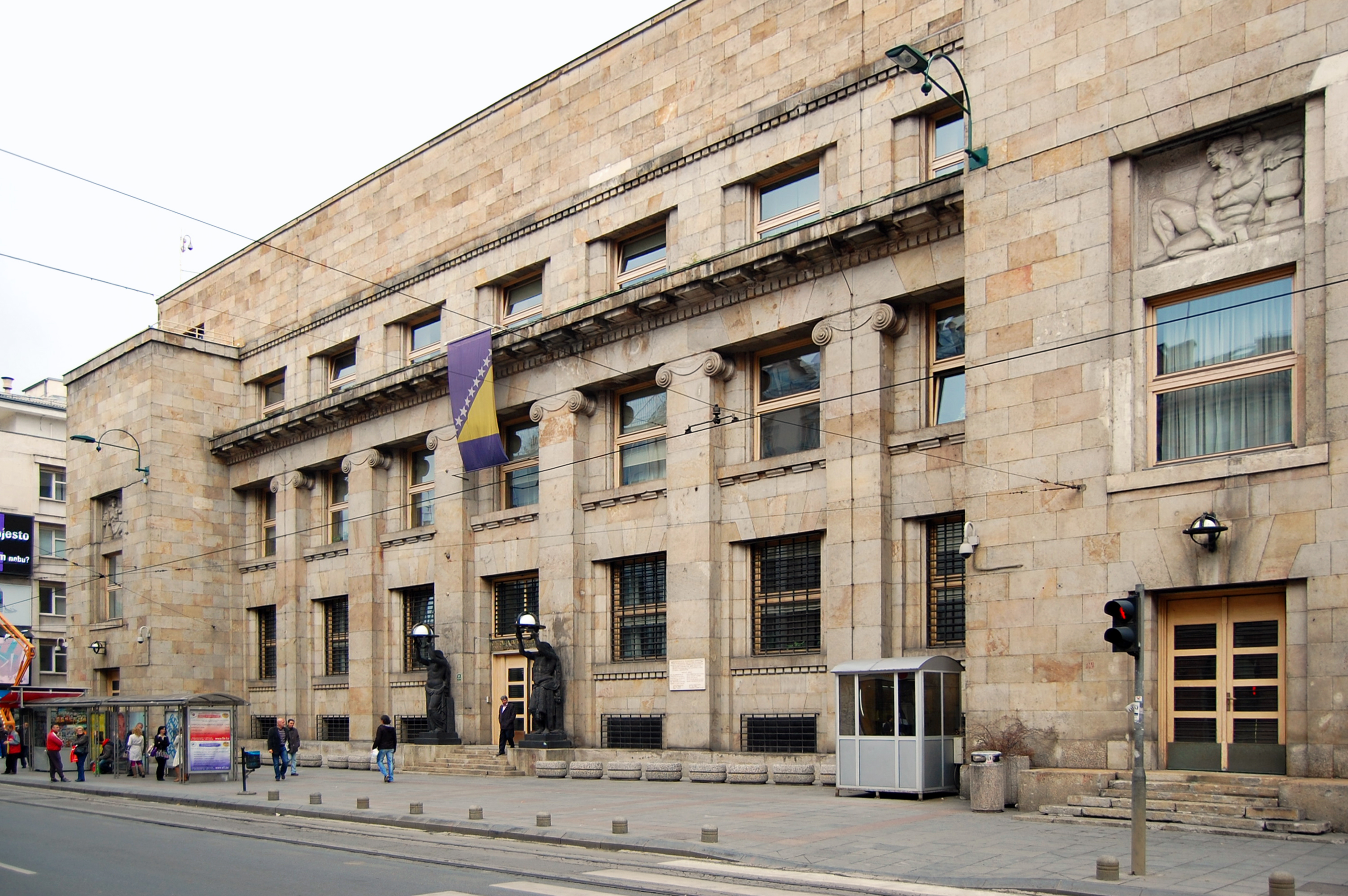
Building of the Central Bank of Bosnia and Herzegovina

Several significant buildings and institutions are located in this street and some of them are:

- Ali Pasha Mosque
- Building of the Presidency of Bosnia and Herzegovina
- Central Bank of Bosnia and Herzegovina
- Landesbank für Bosnien und Herzegowina building and Eternal flame
- Čemaluša Mosque
- Napredak building
- Saint Vincent de Paul church

== Events ==
Marshal Tito street is a popular location to organize open-air concerts and other various celebrations.

On 6 April 2012, this street was the location of the Sarajevo Red Line, a memorial event organized in cooperation between the City of Sarajevo and East West Theatre Company which commemorated the Siege of Sarajevo's 20th anniversary.
