= President of the League of Communists of Bosnia and Herzegovina =

Leader of the League of Communists of Bosnia and Herzegovina

- Serbo-Croatian: Predsjednik Saveza komunista Bosne i Hercegovine
- Emblems of the LCY

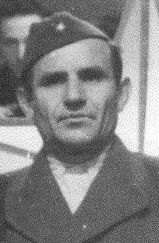
- Longest serving Đuro Pucar; 5 November 1948 – 5 March 1965
- Type: Party leader
- Member of: LCY Presidency and SRBM Presidency
- Appointer: Central Committee
- Term length: Two years, non-renewable (1982–1991)
- Constituting instrument: LCY Charter & LCBM Charter
- Formation: 5 November 1948
- First holder: Đuro Pucar
- Final holder: Nijaz Duraković
- Abolished: 24 February 1991

The president was the leader of the League of Communists of Bosnia and Herzegovina (LCBM), the ruling party of the Socialist Republic of Bosnia and Herzegovina (SRBM) in the Socialist Federal Republic of Yugoslavia. Party rules stipulated that the LCBM Central Committee elected the president. Moreover, the Central Committee was empowered to remove the president. The president served ex officio as a member of the Presidency of the Central Committee of the League of Communists of Yugoslavia (LCY) and of the SRBM Presidency. To be eligible to serve, the president had to be a member of the Presidency of the LCBM Central Committee. The 8th LCBM Congress instituted a two-year term limits for officeholders.

The office traces its lineage back to the office of "Secretary of the Provincial Committee of the Communist Party of Yugoslavia in Bosnia and Herzegovina," established after the founding of the LCY in 1919. This body had no distinct rights and was under the jurisdiction of the Yugoslav Central Committee. On 1 November 1948, the LCY convened the founding congress of the Communist Party of Bosnia and Herzegovina. On 5 November, the Central Committee of the 1st Congress elected Đuro Pucar as "Secretary of the Central Committee of the Communist Party of Bosnia and Herzegovina". The LCY 6th Congress on 2–7 November 1952, renamed the party League of Communists, and the Bosnian republican branch followed suit and changed its name to League of Communists of Bosnia and Herzegovina. On 4 October 1966, the 5th Plenary Session of the Central Committee of the LCY 8th Congress abolished the office of General Secretary at the national level and replaced with the office of President. The LCBM Central Committee convened a meeting later on 14 November 1966 that abolished the office of secretary and established the "President of the Central Committee of the League of Communists of Bosnia and Herzegovina". The reforms passed by the LCY Central Committee plenum strengthened the powers of the republican branches and gave more powers to the Bosnian party leader. The 8th LCBM Congress introduced another set of reforms on 20 May 1982, which abolished the existing office and replaced it with the "President of the Presidency of the Central Committee of the League of Communists of Bosnia and Herzegovina". This office was retained until 24 February 1991, when the party changed its name to the Social Democratic Party.

== Office history ==
Title	Established	Abolished	Established by
Secretary of the Provincial Committee of the Communist Party of Yugoslavia in Bosnia and Herzegovina; Serbo-Croatian: Sekretar Pokrajinskog komiteta Komunističke partije Jugoslavije za Bosne i Hercegovine	23 April 1919	5 November 1948	1st Congress of the Socialist Labour Party of Yugoslavia (Communists)
Secretary of the Central Committee of the League of Communists of Bosnia and Herzegovina; Serbo-Croatian: Sekretar Centralnog komiteta Saveza komunista Bosne i Hercegovine	5 November 1948	14 November 1966	1st Congress of the Communist Party of Bosnia and Herzegovina
President of the Central Committee of the League of Communists of Bosnia and Herzegovina; Serbo-Croatian: Predsjednik Centralnog komiteta Saveza komunista Bosne i Hercegovine	14 November 1966	29 May 1982	? Plenary Session of the Central Committee of the 4th Congress
President of the Presidency of the Central Committee of the League of Communists of Bosnia and Herzegovina; Serbo-Croatian: Predsjednik Predsjedništva Centralnog komiteta Saveza komunista Bosne i Hercegovine	29 May 1982	9 December 1989	9th Congress of the League of Communists of Bosnia and Herzegovina
President of the Central Committee of the League of Communists of Bosnia and Herzegovina; Serbo-Croatian: Predsjednik Centralnog komiteta Saveza komunista Bosne i Hercegovine	9 December 1989	24 February 1991	? Plenary Session of the Central Committee of the 4th Congress

== Officeholders ==
=== Provincial ===
Leaders of the Provincial Committee of the Communist Party of Yugoslavia for Bosnia and Herzegovina
No.	Portrait	Name	Took office	Left office	Tenure	Birth	PM	Death	Ref.
1		Isa Jovanović	1939	8 July 1943	3 years, 188 days	1906	1928	1983	
2		Đuro Pucar	8 July 1943	5 November 1948	5 years, 120 days	1899	1922	1979	

=== Republican ===
Leaders of the League of Communists of Bosnia and Herzegovina
No.	Portrait	Name	Took office	Left office	Tenure	Term of office	Birth	PM	Death	Ref.
1		Đuro Pucar	5 November 1948	5 March 1965	16 years, 120 days	1st–3rd (1948–1965)	1899	1922	1979	
2		Cvijetin Mijatović	5 March 1965	9 April 1969	3 years, 35 days	4th–5th (1965–1974)	1913	1934	1993	
3		Branko Mikulić	9 April 1969	11 May 1978	9 years, 32 days	5th–6th (1969–1978)	1928	1945	1994	
4		Nikola Stojanović	11 May 1978	20 May 1982	4 years, 9 days	7th (1982–1986)	1933	1952	2020	
5		Hamdija Pozderac	20 May 1982	28 May 1984	2 years, 8 days	8th (1982–1986)	1924	1943	1988	
6		Mato Andrić	28 May 1984	21 May 1986	1 year, 358 days	8th (1982–1986)	1928	1945	2015	
7		Milan Uzelac	21 May 1986	8 July 1988	2 years, 48 days	9th (1986–1989)	1932	1949	2005	
8		Abdulah Mutapčić	8 July 1988	29 June 1989	356 days	9th (1986–1989)	1932	1960	2013	
9		Nijaz Duraković	29 June 1989	24 February 1991	1 year, 240 days	9th–10th (1986–1991)	1949	1967	2012	

== Bibliography ==
=== Books ===
- Lewytzkyj, Borys; Stroynowski, Juliusz, eds. (1978). Who's Who in the Socialist Countries. K. G. Saur Verlag. ISBN 3-7940-3017-6.
- Rajović, Radošin, ed. (1970). Jugoslovenski savremenici: Ko je ko u Jugoslaviji [Yugoslav Contemporaries: Who's Who in Yugoslavia] (in Serbo-Croatian). Hronometar.
- Stanković, Slobodan (1981). The End of the Tito Era: Yugoslavia's Dilemmas. Hoover International Studies. ISBN 9780817973629.
- Stroynowski, Juliusz, ed. (1989a). Who's Who in the Socialist Countries of Europe: A–H. K. G. Saur Verlag. ISBN 3-598-10719-6.
- Stroynowski, Juliusz, ed. (1989b). Who's Who in the Socialist Countries of Europe: I–O. K. G. Saur Verlag. ISBN 3-598-10719-6.
- Stroynowski, Juliusz, ed. (1989c). Who's Who in the Socialist Countries of Europe: P–Z. K. G. Saur Verlag. ISBN 3-598-10719-6.
- Tadić, Aleksandar (1968). Pali za lepša svitanja: Majke heroja pričaju [Lights For More Beautiful dawns: Mothers of Heroes Talk] (in Serbo-Croatian). Međunarodna štampa-Interpress.
- Tito, Josip Broz (1984). Damjanović, Pero; Vujošević, Ubavka (eds.). Sabrana djela [Selected Works] (in Serbo-Croatian). Vol. 16. Komunist.
- Zalar, Charles, ed. (1961). Yugoslav Communism: A Critical Study. United States Government Printing Office. Archived from the original on 11 June 2023.

=== Newspapers ===
- Staff writer (17 May 1982). "Чланови Савезног извршног већа" [Members of the Federal Executive Council]. Borba (in Serbo-Croatian). Socialist Alliance of Working People: 4.
