= Central Committee of the 2nd Congress of the League of Communists of Bosnia and Herzegovina =

2nd Central Committee
- Party emblem

27 November 1954 – 26 March 1959 (4 years, 119 days) Overview
- Type: Highest organ
- Election: 2nd Congress

Members
- Total: 57 members
- Newcomers: 19 members
- Old: 38 members (1st)
- Reelected: 46 members (3rd)

This electoral term of the Central Committee was elected by the 2nd Congress of the League of Communists of Bosnia and Herzegovina in 1954, and was in session until the gathering of the 3rd Congress in 1959.

== Members ==
Members of the Central Committee of the 2nd Congress of the League of Communists of Bosnia and Herzegovina
Name	1st	3rd	Birth	PM	Death	Nationality	Gender	Ref.
Nisim Albahari	Old	Elected	1916	1935	1991	Jew	Male	
Nikola Andrić	New	Elected	1920	1941	1992	Serb	Male	
Ljubo Babić	Old	Not	1916	1940	2014	Serb	Male	
Jozo Bakrač	Old	Elected	1910	1939	1990	Croat	Male	
Muhidin Begić	Old	Elected	1918	1941	2000	Serb	Male	
Vlajko Begović	Old	Not	1905	1930	1989	Serb	Male	
Stojan Bjelajac	New	Not	1923	1941	2004	Serb	Male	
Džemal Bijedić	Old	Elected	1917	1939	1977	Muslim	Male	
Danilo Bilanović	New	Elected	1925	1943	1994	Serb	Male	
Hasan Brkić	Old	Not	1913	1933	1965	Muslim	Male	
Salim Ćerić	New	Elected	1918	1941	1987	Muslim	Male	
Rodoljub Čolaković	Old	Not	1900	1919	1983	Serb	Male	
Jovanka Čović	New	Elected	1924	1940	?	Serb	Female	
Nikola Cvijetić	Old	Elected	1913	1940	1991	Serb	Male	
Uglješa Danilović	Old	Elected	1913	1935	2003	Serb	Male	
Nijaz Dizdarević	New	Elected	1920	1942	1989	Muslim	Male	
Ilija Došen	Old	Not	1914	1936	1991	Serb	Male	
Ratomir Dugonjić	New	Not	1916	1937	1987	Serb	Male	
Milutin Đurašković	Old	Elected	1917	1939	1972	Serb	Male	
Blažo Đuričić	Old	Elected	1914	1941	1991	Serb	Male	
Safet Filipović	New	Elected	1908	1929	1967	Muslim	Male	
Dušan Grk	Old	Elected	1906	1941	1994	Serb	Male	
Adem Hercegovac	New	Not	1914	1941	1992	Muslim	Male	
Rade Jakšić	New	Elected	1911	1941	1996	Serb	Male	
Niko Jurinčić	Old	Elected	1914	1935	1983	Serb	Male	
Hajrudin Kapetanović	Old	Elected	1914	1935	1983	Serb	Male	
Čedo Kapor	Old	Elected	1914	1936	2004	Serb	Male	
Osman Karabegović	Old	Elected	1911	1932	1996	Muslim	Male	
Nikola Kotle	Old	Elected	1915	1939	1990	Serb	Male	
Dušanka Kovačević	Old	Elected	1917	1940	1985	Serb	Female	
Todo Kurtović	New	Elected	1919	1941	1997	Serb	Male	
Šefket Maglajlić	Old	Elected	1912	1932	1983	Muslim	Male	
Pašaga Mandžić	Old	Elected	1907	1929	1975	Serb	Male	
Olga Marasović	New	Elected	1914	1938	1996	Serb	Female	
Joco Marjanović	Old	Elected	1925	?	1991	Serb	Male	
Slobodan Marjanovic	Old	Elected	1914	1940	1997	Serb	Male	
Ilija Materić	Old	Elected	1911	1941	2004	Serb	Male	
Savo Medan	Old	Elected	1903	1924	1971	Serb	Male	
Cvijetin Mijatović	Old	Elected	1913	1934	1993	Serb	Male	
Asim Mujkić	Old	Elected	1919	1936	2000	Serb	Male	
Grujo Novaković	Old	Elected	1913	1936	1975	Serb	Male	
Franc Novak	New	Elected	1915	1940	1990	Serb	Male	
Dane Olbina	New	Elected	1919	1941	2011	Serb	Male	
Milan Pantić	New	Elected	1915	1941	1977	Serb	Male	
Radovan Papić	Old	Not	1910	1940	1983	Serb	Male	
Lepa Perović	Old	Elected	1911	1934	2000	Serb	Female	
Miloš Polić	New	Elected	1914	1941	1994	Serb	Male	
Đuro Pucar	Old	Elected	1899	1922	1979	Serb	Male	
Mićo Rakić	Old	Elected	1922	1941	2007	Serb	Male	
Ibrahim Šator	New	Elected	1915	1941	2010	Serb	Male	
Vlado Šegrt	Old	Elected	1907	1931	1991	Serb	Male	
Radovan Stijačić	New	Elected	1918	1941	1988	Serb	Male	
Velimir Stojnić	Old	Not	1916	1936	1990	Serb	Male	
Vaso Trikić	Old	Elected	1907	1940	1989	Serb	Male	
Milan Trninić	New	Elected	1922	1941	1994	Serb	Male	
Zagorka Umićević	New	Elected	1918	1940	2011	Serb	Female	
Todor Vujasinović	Old	Not	1904	1930	1988	Serb	Male	

== Bibliography ==
- Drachkovitch, Milorad (1973). Biographical Dictionary of the Comintern. Hoover Institution Press. ISBN 9780817984038.
- Gažević, Nikola (1973). Vojna enciklopedija [Military Encyclopedia] (in Serbo-Croatian). Redakcija Vojne enciklopedije.
- Gažević, Nikola (1970). Vojna enciklopedija [Military Encyclopedia] (in Serbo-Croatian). Redakcija Vojne enciklopedije.
- Gažević, Nikola; Todorović, Vojo M. (1966). Vojna enciklopedija [Military Encyclopedia] (in Serbo-Croatian). Redakcija Vojne enciklopedije.
- Janković, Slavko, ed. (1957). Ko je ko u Jugoslaviji: biografski podaci o jugoslovenskim savremenicima [Who's Who in Yugoslavia: Biographical Information About Yugoslav Contemporaries] (in Serbo-Croatian). Vol. 3. Izd. "Sedme sile".
- Lewytzkyj, Borys; Stroynowski, Juliusz, eds. (1978). Who's Who in the Socialist Countries. K. G. Saur Verlag. ISBN 3-7940-3017-6.
- Lukač, Dušan (1968). Banja Luka i okolica u ratu i revoluciji, 1941–1945 [Banja Luka and the Surrounding Area During the War and Revolution, 1941–1945] (in Serbo-Croatian). De Gruyter.
- Marković, Dragan; Kržavac, Savo (1985). Zašto su smenjivani [Why Were They Replaced?] (in Serbo-Croatian). Partizanska knj.
- Martinović, Savo (1970). Deveti kongres Saveza komunista Jugoslavije, Beograd, 11-13. III.1969 [Ninth Congress of the League of Communists of Yugoslavia, Belgrade, 11-13. III.1969] (in Serbo-Croatian). League of Communists of Yugoslavia.
- Nešović, Slobodan (1977). Diplomatska igra oko Jugoslavije 1944–1945. Stvarnost. ISBN 978-3-030-54951-0.
- Nešović, Slobodan (1981). Stvaranje nove Jugoslavije: 1941–1945 [Creation of the New Yugoslavia: 1941–1945] (in Serbo-Croatian). Sarajevo: Mladost. OCLC 444838775.
- Opačić, Nine (1968). Društveno-političke zajednice: Socijalističke republike i autonomme pokrajine [Socio-Political Communities: Socialist Republics and Autonomous Provinces] (in Serbo-Croatian). Međunarodna štampa-Interpress.
- Petković, Aleksandar (1988). Političke borbe za novu Jugoslaviju od Drugog AVNOJ-a do prvog Ustava [Political Struggles for a New Yugoslavia From the Second AVNOJ to the first Constitution] (in Serbo-Croatian). Jugoslovenska revija.
- Rajović, Radošin, ed. (1970). Jugoslovenski savremenici: Ko je ko u Jugoslaviji [Yugoslav Contemporaries: Who's Who in Yugoslavia] (in Serbo-Croatian). Hronometar.
- S̆iljegović, Bos̆ko (1958). Vojna enciklopedija [Military Encyclopedia] (in Serbo-Croatian). Redakcija Vojne enciklopedije.
- Staff writer, ed. (1966). Svjetski almanah [World Almanac] (in Serbo-Croatian). Vol. 4. Novinsko izdavačko poduzeće.
- Staff writer, ed. (1965). VIII Kongres Saveza Komunista Jugoslavije Beograd, 7–13. decembra 1964.: stenog̈rafske beleške [VIII Congress of the Union of Communists of Yugoslavia Belgrade, 7–13 December 1964: shorthand notes] (in Serbo-Croatian). Vol. 3. Kultura.
- Staff writer, ed. (1953). VI kongres Komunističke partije Jugoslavije: 2-7 novembra 1952: stenografske beleške [VI Congress of the Communist Party of Yugoslavia] (in Serbo-Croatian). Kultura.
- Staff writer, ed. (1948). Odluke V. kongresa Komunističke Partije Jugoslavije [Decisions of the Fifth Congress of the Communist Party of Yugoslavia] (in Serbo-Croatian). Kultura.
- Tito, Josip Broz (1982). Damjanović, Pero; Vujošević, Ubavka (eds.). Sabrana djela: Oktobar 1940-April 1941 [Selected Works: 1940 – April 1941] (in Serbo-Croatian). Institut za savremenu istoriju.
- Stroynowski, Juliusz, ed. (1989a). Who's Who in the Socialist Countries of Europe: A–H. K. G. Saur Verlag. ISBN 3-598-10719-6.
- Stroynowski, Juliusz, ed. (1989b). Who's Who in the Socialist Countries of Europe: I–O. K. G. Saur Verlag. ISBN 3-598-10719-6.
- Stroynowski, Juliusz, ed. (1989c). Who's Who in the Socialist Countries of Europe: P–Z. K. G. Saur Verlag. ISBN 3-598-10719-6.
- Zalar, Charles, ed. (1961). Yugoslav Communism: A Critical Study. United States Government Printing Office. Archived from the original on 11 June 2023.
