= Secretary of the Presidency of the League of Communists of Bosnia and Herzegovina =

Administrative leader of the League of Communists of Bosnia and Herzegovina

- Bosnian: Sekretar Predsjedništva Saveza komunista Bosne i Hercegovine
- Emblems of the LCY

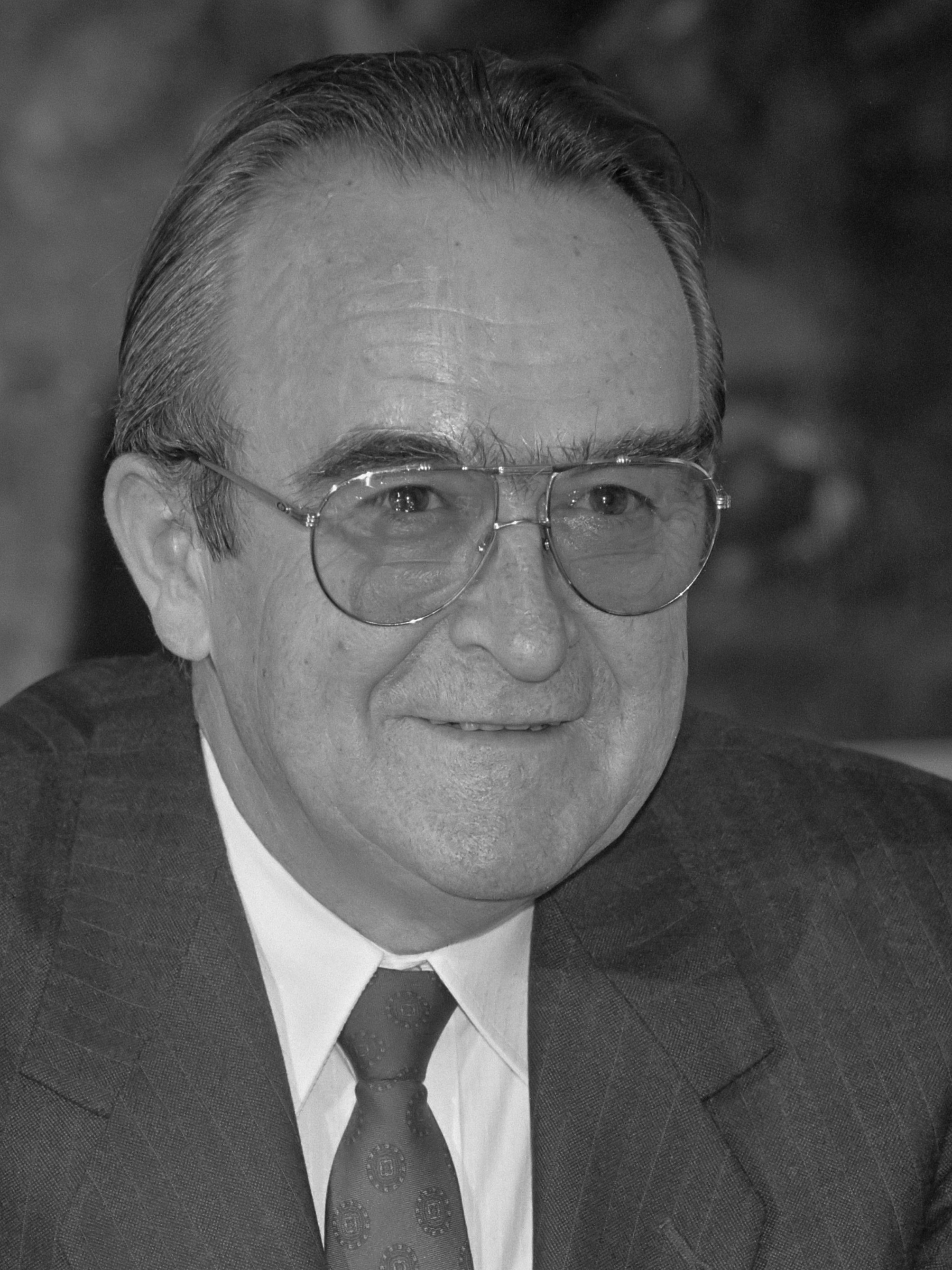
- First officeholder Branko Mikulić; 14 November 1966 – 9 April 1969
- Type: Chief of staff
- Member of: SK BiH Presidency
- Appointer: SK BiH Presidency
- Term length: Two to four years, renewable (1966–1990)
- Constituting instrument: LCY Charter & SK BiH Charter
- Formation: 14 November 1966
- First holder: Branko Mikulić
- Final holder: Dragan Kragulj
- Abolished: 24 February 1991

The secretary was the highest administrative leader of the Presidency of the Central Committee of the League of Communists of Bosnia and Herzegovina (SK BiH), the ruling party of the Socialist Republic of Bosnia and Herzegovina (SR Bosnia and Herzegovina) in the Socialist Federal Republic of Yugoslavia and a branch of the League of Communists of Yugoslavia (LCY). The officeholder was elected by and answerable to the SK BiH Presidency.

== Office history ==
| Title | Established | Abolished | Established by |
|---|---|---|---|
| Secretary of the Executive Bureau of the Central Committee of the League of Communists of Bosnia and Herzegovina; Bosnian: Sekretar Izvršnog biroa Centralnog komiteta Saveza komunista Bosne i Hercegovine | 14 November 1966 | 28 March 1974 | ? Plenary Session of the Central Committee of the SK BiH 4th Congress |
| Secretary of the Executive Committee of the Central Committee of the League of Communists of Bosnia and Herzegovina; Bosnian: Sekretar Izvršnog komiteta Centralnog komiteta Saveza komunista Bosne i Hercegovine | 28 March 1974 | 20 May 1982 | 6th Congress of the League of Communists of Bosnia and Herzegovina |
| Secretary of the Presidency of the Central Committee of the League of Communists of Bosnia and Herzegovina; Bosnian: Sekretar Predsjedništva Centralnog komiteta Saveza komunista Bosne i Hercegovine | 16 May 1982 | 24 February 1991 | 8th Congress of the League of Communists of Bosnia and Herzegovina |

== Officeholders ==
Secretaries of the Presidency of the Central Committee of the League of Communists of Bosnia and Herzegovina
| No. | Name | Took office | Left office | Tenure | Term of office | Birth | PM | Death | Nation | Ref. |
|---|---|---|---|---|---|---|---|---|---|---|
| 1 | Branko Mikulić | 14 November 1966 | 11 January 1969 | 2 years, 58 days | 4th (1965–1969) | 1928 | 1945 | 1994 | Croat | |
| 2 | Nijaz Dizdarević | 11 January 1969 | 9 April 1969 | 88 days | 5th (1969–1974) | 1920 | 1942 | 1989 | Muslim | |
| 3 | Hamdija Pozderac | 9 April 1969 | 31 July 1971 | 4 years, 361 days | 5th (1969–1974) | 1924 | 1943 | 1988 | Muslim | |
| 4 | Hasan Grabčanović | 31 July 1971 | 28 March 1974 | 2 years, 240 days | 5th (1969–1974) | 1918 | 1940 | 1996 | Muslim | |
| 5 | Nikola Stojanović | 28 March 1974 | 11 May 1978 | 4 years, 44 days | 6th (1974–1978) | 1933 | 1952 | 2020 | Serb | |
| 6 | Hrvoje Ištuk | 11 May 1978 | 20 May 1982 | 8 years, 10 days | 7th (1978–1982) | 1935 | 1954 | 2002 | Croat | |
| 7 | Ivan Brigić | 20 May 1982 | 28 May 1984 | 2 years, 8 days | 8th (1982–1986) | 1936 | 1957 | 2015 | Croat | |
| 8 | Živko Grubor | 28 May 1984 | 21 May 1986 | 1 year, 358 days | 8th (1982–1986) | ? | ? | ? | Serb | |
| 9 | Šaban Kevrić | 21 May 1986 | 8 July 1988 | 2 years, 48 days | 9th (1986–1989) | 1949 | 1967 | ? | Muslim | |
| 10 | Ivan Cvitković | 8 July 1988 | 9 December 1989 | 1 year, 154 days | 9th (1986–1989) | 1945 | 1962 | Alive | Croat | |
| 11 | Dragan Kragulj | 8 January 1990 | 24 February 1991 | 1 year, 47 days | 10th (1989–1991) | 1949 | ? | Alive | Muslim | |

== Bibliography ==
=== Books ===
- Lewytzkyj, Borys; Stroynowski, Juliusz, eds. (1978). Who's Who in the Socialist Countries. K. G. Saur Verlag. ISBN 3-7940-3017-6.
- Rajović, Radošin, ed. (1970). Jugoslovenski savremenici: Ko je ko u Jugoslaviji [Yugoslav Contemporaries: Who's Who in Yugoslavia] (in Serbo-Croatian). Hronometar.
- Stanković, Slobodan (1981). The End of the Tito Era: Yugoslavia's Dilemmas. Hoover International Studies. ISBN 9780817973629.
- Stroynowski, Juliusz, ed. (1989a). Who's Who in the Socialist Countries of Europe: A–H. K. G. Saur Verlag. ISBN 3-598-10719-6.
- Stroynowski, Juliusz, ed. (1989b). Who's Who in the Socialist Countries of Europe: I–O. K. G. Saur Verlag. ISBN 3-598-10719-6.
- Stroynowski, Juliusz, ed. (1989c). Who's Who in the Socialist Countries of Europe: P–Z. K. G. Saur Verlag. ISBN 3-598-10719-6.

=== Newspapers ===
- Staff writer (30 June 1982). "Централни комитет Савеза комуниста Југославије" [Central Committee of the League of Communists of Yugoslavia]. Borba (in Serbo-Croatian). Socialist Alliance of Working People: 6–7.
- Staff writer (5 January 1970). "Омладина и религија" [Youth and Religion]. Borba (in Serbo-Croatian). Socialist Alliance of Working People: 4.
