= Central Committee of the 4th Congress of the League of Communists of Bosnia and Herzegovina =

4th Central Committee
- Party emblem

2 March 1965 – 9 January 1969 (3 years, 313 days) Overview
- Type: Highest organ
- Election: 4th Congress

Members
- Total: 103 members
- Newcomers: 63 members
- Old: 40 members (3rd)
- Reelected: 17 members (5th)

This electoral term of the Central Committee was elected by the 4th Congress of the League of Communists of Bosnia and Herzegovina in 1965, and was in session until the gathering of the 5th Congress in 1969.

== Members ==
Members of the Central Committee of the 4th Congress of the League of Communists of Bosnia and Herzegovina
Name	3rd	5th	Birth	PM	Death	Nationality	Gender	Ref.
Ahmed Ajanović	New	Not	?	?	?	Serb	Male	
Nisim Albahari	Old	Not	1916	1935	1991	Jew	Male	
Novak Anđelić	Old	Not	1922	1941	2010	Serb	Male	
Mato Andrić	New	Elected	1928	1945	2015	Croat	Male	
Ivica Atlija	New	Not	1931	?	?	Serb	Male	
Sead Babović	New	Not	1935	1954	2022	Muslim	Male	
Jozo Bakrač	Old	Not	1910	1939	1990	Croat	Male	
Ratko Bajić	Old	Not	1921	1941	2006	Serb	Male	
Boško Baškot	New	Not	1922	1941	2013	Serb	Male	
Muhidin Begić	Old	Not	1918	1941	2000	Serb	Male	
Božo Bevanda	New	Not	1931	1947	2008	Serb	Male	
Džemal Bijedić	Old	Not	1917	1939	1977	Muslim	Male	
Stipo Bilan	Old	Not	1922	1941	?	Croat	Male	
Danilo Bilanović	Old	Not	1925	1943	1994	Serb	Male	
Grozdana Bilanović	New	Not	1926	?	?	Serb	Female	
Pavle Bošnjak	New	Not	1935	?	?	Serb	Male	
Hasan Brkić	Return	Not	1913	1933	1965	Muslim	Male	
Edhem Ćamo	Old	Not	1909	1941	1996	Muslim	Male	
Ahmed Čatić	New	Elected	1921	1944	2003	Muslim	Male	
Esad Cerić	New	Not	1922	1942	2010	Muslim	Male	
Jelena Čišić	New	Not	1926	?	2000	Serb	Female	
Vojislav Čolović	New	Not	1920	1941	2010	Serb	Male	
Jovanka Čović	Old	Not	1924	1940	?	Serb	Female	
Nikola Cvijetić	Old	Not	1913	1940	1991	Serb	Male	
Uglješa Danilović	Old	Not	1913	1935	2003	Serb	Male	
Petar Dodik	New	Elected	1925	?	2015	Serb	Male	
Karlo Dombaj	New	Not	1916	1941	1989	Serb	Male	
Ratomir Dugonjić	Return	Elected	1916	1937	1987	Serb	Male	
Hajrudin Đulbić	New	Elected	1931	?	2014	Muslim	Male	
Milutin Đurašković	Old	Not	1917	1939	1972	Serb	Male	
Blažo Đuričić	Old	Not	1914	1941	1991	Serb	Male	
Danica Erak	New	Not	1922	?	?	Serb	Female	
Slobodan Erceg	Old	Not	1922	1941	1976	Serb	Male	
Vaso Gačić	New	Not	1923	1941	2006	Serb	Male	
Rajko Gagović	Old	Not	1921	1942	?	Serb	Male	
Ale Galić	New	Not	1923	1942	1980	Serb	Male	
Marica Grabež	New	Not	1934	?	?	Serb	Female	
Džavid Gunić	New	Not	1933	?	?	Serb	Male	
Kemal Halilović	New	Not	1922	?	2013	Muslim	Male	
Adem Hercegovac	Old	Not	1914	1941	1992	Muslim	Male	
Esad Horozić	New	Elected	1929	?	2019	Muslim	Male	
Refik Hukić	New	Not	1927	?	1982	Serb	Male	
Ivica Jakić	New	Not	1934	1948	?	Serb	Male	
Rade Jakšić	Old	Not	1911	1941	1996	Serb	Male	
Pero Jelčić	Old	Not	1915	1939	1993	Serb	New	
Ivo Jerkić	Old	Not	1917	1941	1997	Serb	Male	
Niko Jurinčić	Old	Not	1914	1935	1983	Serb	Male	
Čedo Kapor	Old	Not	1914	1936	2004	Serb	Male	
Momir Kapor	Old	Not	1918	1941	2003	Serb	Male	
Hatidža Karabeg	New	Elected	1922	1942	1999	Muslim	Female	
Jovanka Karapetrović	New	Not	1926	1941	?	Serb	Female	
Duško Knežević	New	Not	?	?	?	Serb	Male	
Milan Knežević	Old	Not	1921	1942	1976	Serb	Male	
Ljubo Kovačević	New	Not	1924	?	?	Serb	Male	
Anto Krešić	New	Not	1933	?	?	Serb	Male	
Šefket Kunosić	Old	Not	1927	1943	2009	Serb	Male	
Dubravka Latifić	New	Not	1923	1943	2018	Serb	Female	
Jovica Lazarević	New	Not	1923	1943	?	Serb	Male	
Sreten Lopandić	New	Elected	1920	?	1998	Serb	Male	
Šefket Maglajlić	Old	Not	1912	1932	1983	Muslim	Male	
Pašaga Mandžić	Old	Not	1907	1929	1975	Serb	Male	
Joco Marjanović	Old	Not	1925	?	1991	Serb	Male	
Slobodan Marjanović	Old	Not	1914	1940	1997	Serb	Male	
Ilija Materić	Old	Not	1911	1941	2004	Serb	Male	
Lazo Materić	New	Not	1920	1941	1999	Serb	Male	
Radmila Matić	New	Not	1925	?	?	Serb	Female	
Drago Mažar	Old	Not	1918	1941	?	Serb	Male	
Munir Mesihović	New	Elected	1928	1946	2016	Muslim	Male	
Niko Mihaljević	Old	Elected	1920	1941	2005	Croat	Male	
Cvijetin Mijatović	Return	Elected	1913	1934	1993	Serb	Male	
Branko Mikulić	New	Elected	1928	1945	1994	Croat	Male	
Miloš Milaković	Old	Not	1921	1941	?	Serb	Male	
Ivica Momčilović	New	Not	1919	?	?	Serb	Male	
Hajrudin Mujičić	New	Not	1933	?	?	Muslim	Male	
Stojan Mutić	New	Not	1931	?	?	Serb	Male	
Panto Nikolić	New	Not	1922	1942	1991	Serb	Male	
Franc Novak	Old	Not	1915	1940	1990	Serb	Male	
Nevenka Novaković	New	Not	1926	1941	?	Serb	Female	
Milenko Ostojić	New	Not	1927	?	?	Serb	Male	
Ferdo Palac	New	Elected	1932	?	1980	Croat	Male	
Milan Pantić	Old	Not	1915	1941	1977	Serb	Male	
Nenad Petrović	New	Not	1911	1934	?	Serb	Male	
Hamdija Pozderac	New	Elected	1924	1943	1988	Muslim	Male	
Boro Princip	New	Not	1924	1941	1982	Serb	Male	
Đuro Pucar	Old	Not	1899	1922	1979	Serb	Male	
Vaso Radić	Old	Not	1923	1941	2011	Serb	Male	
Sana Salahović	New	Not	1926	1941	1986	Serb	Female	
Nedim Šarac	New	Not	1926	?	2008	Serb	Male	
Ibrahim Šator	Old	Not	1915	1941	2010	Serb	Male	
Vojo Savić	New	Not	1922	1941	?	Serb	Male	
Vlado Šegrt	Old	Not	1907	1931	1991	Serb	Male	
Bojan Selić	New	Not	?	?	?	Serb	Male	
Vehid Smajlović	New	Elected	1928	1943	2002	Muslim	Male	
Zora Solomon	New	Not	1936	?	?	Serb	Female	
Mira Stankovšinik	New	Not	?	?	?	Serb	Female	
Radovan Stijačić	Old	Not	1918	1941	1988	Serb	Male	
Redžo Terzić	New	Not	1924	1941	1998	Serb	Male	
Stanko Tomić	New	Elected	1926	1943	?	Serb	Male	
Dedo Trampić	New	Not	1922	1941	2017	Muslim	Male	
Mile Trkulja	New	Not	1921	1941	2012	Serb	Male	
Rifat Tvrtković	New	Not	1921	?	1995	Serb	Male	
Jusuf Zjakić	New	Not	1937	?	2024	Serb	Male	
Bekto Zonjić	New	Elected	1928	?	?	Muslim	Male	

== Bibliography ==
- Drachkovitch, Milorad (1973). Biographical Dictionary of the Comintern. Hoover Institution Press. ISBN 9780817984038.
- Gažević, Nikola (1973). Vojna enciklopedija [Military Encyclopedia] (in Serbo-Croatian). Redakcija Vojne enciklopedije.
- Gažević, Nikola (1970). Vojna enciklopedija [Military Encyclopedia] (in Serbo-Croatian). Redakcija Vojne enciklopedije.
- Gažević, Nikola; Todorović, Vojo M. (1966). Vojna enciklopedija [Military Encyclopedia] (in Serbo-Croatian). Redakcija Vojne enciklopedije.
- Janković, Slavko, ed. (1957). Ko je ko u Jugoslaviji: biografski podaci o jugoslovenskim savremenicima [Who's Who in Yugoslavia: Biographical Information About Yugoslav Contemporaries] (in Serbo-Croatian). Vol. 3. Izd. "Sedme sile".
- Konjikušić, Davor (2021). Red Glow: Yugoslav Partisan Photography and Social Movement, 1941–1945. De Gruyter. ISBN 978-3-422-98640-4.
- Lewytzkyj, Borys; Stroynowski, Juliusz, eds. (1978). Who's Who in the Socialist Countries. K. G. Saur Verlag. ISBN 3-7940-3017-6.
- Lukač, Dušan (1968). Banja Luka i okolica u ratu i revoluciji, 1941–1945 [Banja Luka and the Surrounding Area During the War and Revolution, 1941–1945] (in Serbo-Croatian). De Gruyter.
- Marković, Dragan; Kržavac, Savo (1985). Zašto su smenjivani [Why Were They Replaced?] (in Serbo-Croatian). Partizanska knj.
- Martinović, Savo (1970). Deveti kongres Saveza komunista Jugoslavije, Beograd, 11-13. III.1969 [Ninth Congress of the League of Communists of Yugoslavia, Belgrade, 11-13. III.1969] (in Serbo-Croatian). League of Communists of Yugoslavia.
- Nešović, Slobodan (1981). Stvaranje nove Jugoslavije: 1941–1945 [Creation of the New Yugoslavia: 1941–1945] (in Serbo-Croatian). Sarajevo: Mladost. OCLC 444838775.
- Opačić, Nine (1968). Društveno-političke zajednice: Socijalističke republike i autonomme pokrajine [Socio-Political Communities: Socialist Republics and Autonomous Provinces] (in Serbo-Croatian). Međunarodna štampa-Interpress.
- Petković, Aleksandar (1988). Političke borbe za novu Jugoslaviju od Drugog AVNOJ-a do prvog Ustava [Political Struggles for a New Yugoslavia From the Second AVNOJ to the first Constitution] (in Serbo-Croatian). Jugoslovenska revija.
- Rajović, Radošin, ed. (1970). Jugoslovenski savremenici: Ko je ko u Jugoslaviji [Yugoslav Contemporaries: Who's Who in Yugoslavia] (in Serbo-Croatian). Hronometar.
- S̆iljegović, Bos̆ko (1958). Vojna enciklopedija [Military Encyclopedia] (in Serbo-Croatian). Redakcija Vojne enciklopedije.
- Staff writer, ed. (1966). Svjetski almanah [World Almanac] (in Serbo-Croatian). Vol. 4. Novinsko izdavačko poduzeće.
- Staff writer, ed. (1965). VIII Kongres Saveza Komunista Jugoslavije Beograd, 7–13. decembra 1964.: stenog̈rafske beleške [VIII Congress of the Union of Communists of Yugoslavia Belgrade, 7–13 December 1964: shorthand notes] (in Serbo-Croatian). Vol. 3. Kultura.
- Staff writer, ed. (1953). VI kongres Komunističke partije Jugoslavije: 2-7 novembra 1952: stenografske beleške [VI Congress of the Communist Party of Yugoslavia] (in Serbo-Croatian). Kultura.
- Staff writer, ed. (1948). Odluke V. kongresa Komunističke Partije Jugoslavije [Decisions of the Fifth Congress of the Communist Party of Yugoslavia] (in Serbo-Croatian). Kultura.
- Tito, Josip Broz (1982). Damjanović, Pero; Vujošević, Ubavka (eds.). Sabrana djela: Oktobar 1940-April 1941 [Selected Works: 1940 – April 1941] (in Serbo-Croatian). Institut za savremenu istoriju.
- Stroynowski, Juliusz, ed. (1989a). Who's Who in the Socialist Countries of Europe: A–H. K. G. Saur Verlag. ISBN 3-598-10719-6.
- Stroynowski, Juliusz, ed. (1989b). Who's Who in the Socialist Countries of Europe: I–O. K. G. Saur Verlag. ISBN 3-598-10719-6.
- Stroynowski, Juliusz, ed. (1989c). Who's Who in the Socialist Countries of Europe: P–Z. K. G. Saur Verlag. ISBN 3-598-10719-6.
- Zalar, Charles, ed. (1961). Yugoslav Communism: A Critical Study. United States Government Printing Office. Archived from the original on 11 June 2023.
