= Central Committee of the 1st Congress of the Communist Party of Bosnia and Herzegovina =

1st Central Committee
- Party emblem

5 November 1948 – 25 November 1954 (6 years, 20 days) Overview
- Type: Highest organ
- Election: 1st Congress

Members
- Total: 48 members
- Newcomers: 48 members
- Reelected: 37 members (2nd)

This electoral term of the Central Committee was elected by the 1st Congress of the Communist Party of Bosnia and Herzegovina in 1948, and was in session until the gathering of the 2nd Congress in 1954.

== Members ==
Members of the Central Committee of the 1st Congress of the Communist Party of Bosnia and Herzegovina
Name	2nd	Birth	PM	Death	Nationality	Gender	Ref.
Nisim Albahari	Elected	1916	1935	1991	Jew	Male	
Ljubo Babić	Elected	1916	1940	2014	Serb	Male	
Jozo Bakrač	Elected	1910	1939	1990	Croat	Male	
Muhidin Begić	Elected	1918	1941	2000	Serb	Male	
Vlajko Begović	Elected	1905	1930	1989	Serb	Male	
Džemal Bijedić	Elected	1917	1939	1977	Muslim	Male	
Hasan Brkić	Elected	1913	1933	1965	Muslim	Male	
Vaso Butozan	Not	1902	1941	1974	Serb	Male	
Rodoljub Čolaković	Elected	1900	1919	1983	Serb	Male	
Nikola Cvijetić	Elected	1913	1940	1991	Serb	Male	
Uglješa Danilović	Elected	1913	1935	2003	Serb	Male	
Ilija Došen	Elected	1914	1936	1991	Serb	Male	
Milutin Đurašković	Elected	1917	1939	1972	Serb	Male	
Blažo Đuričić	Elected	1914	1941	1991	Serb	Male	
Slobodan Erceg	Not	1922	1941	1976	Serb	Male	
Svetolik Gospić	Not	1913	1937	1998	Serb	Male	
Dušan Grk	Elected	1906	1941	1994	Serb	Male	
Rade Hamović	Not	1916	1941	2009	Serb	Male	
Avdo Humo	Elected	1914	1941	1983	Muslim	Male	
Niko Jurinčić	Elected	1914	1935	1983	Serb	Male	
Hajrudin Kapetanović	Elected	1917	1940	1988	Muslim	Male	
Čedo Kapor	Elected	1914	1936	2004	Serb	Male	
Osman Karabegović	Elected	1911	1932	1996	Muslim	Male	
Rudi Kolak	Not	1918	1941	2004	Croat	Male	
Nikola Kotle	Elected	1915	1939	1990	Serb	Male	
Dušanka Kovačević	Elected	1917	1940	1985	Serb	Female	
Šefket Maglajlić	Elected	1912	1932	1983	Muslim	Male	
Pašaga Mandžić	Elected	1907	1929	1975	Serb	Male	
Slobodan Marjanovic	Elected	1914	1940	1997	Serb	Male	
Šaćir Maslić	Not	1904	?	1968	Muslim	Male	
Ilija Materić	Elected	1911	1941	2004	Serb	Male	
Savo Medan	Elected	1903	1924	1971	Serb	Male	
Cvijetin Mijatović	Elected	1913	1934	1993	Serb	Male	
Milutin Morača	Not	1914	1936	2003	Serb	Male	
Asim Mujkić	Elected	1919	1936	2000	Serb	Male	
Grujo Novaković	Elected	1913	1936	1975	Serb	Male	
Radovan Papić	Elected	1910	1940	1983	Serb	Male	
Lepa Perović	Elected	1911	1934	2000	Serb	Female	
Đuro Pucar	Elected	1899	1922	1979	Serb	Male	
Mićo Rakić	Elected	1922	1941	2007	Serb	Male	
Slavko Rodić	Died	1918	1939	1949	Serb	Male	
Vlado Šegrt	Elected	1907	1931	1991	Serb	Male	
Boško Šiljegović	Not	1915	1940	1990	Serb	Male	
Duško Šobot	Not	1920	1940	?	Serb	Male	
Velimir Stojnić	Elected	1916	1936	1990	Serb	Male	
Vaso Trikić	Elected	1907	1940	1989	Serb	Male	
Nemanja Vlatković	Not	1914	1940	1961	Serb	Male	
Todor Vujasinović	Elected	1904	1930	1988	Serb	Male	

== Bibliography ==
- Drachkovitch, Milorad (1973). Biographical Dictionary of the Comintern. Hoover Institution Press. ISBN 9780817984038.
- Gažević, Nikola (1973). Vojna enciklopedija [Military Encyclopedia] (in Serbo-Croatian). Redakcija Vojne enciklopedije.
- Gažević, Nikola (1970). Vojna enciklopedija [Military Encyclopedia] (in Serbo-Croatian). Redakcija Vojne enciklopedije.
- Gažević, Nikola; Todorović, Vojo M. (1966). Vojna enciklopedija [Military Encyclopedia] (in Serbo-Croatian). Redakcija Vojne enciklopedije.
- Janković, Slavko, ed. (1957). Ko je ko u Jugoslaviji: biografski podaci o jugoslovenskim savremenicima [Who's Who in Yugoslavia: Biographical Information About Yugoslav Contemporaries] (in Serbo-Croatian). Vol. 3. Izd. "Sedme sile".
- Lewytzkyj, Borys; Stroynowski, Juliusz, eds. (1978). Who's Who in the Socialist Countries. K. G. Saur Verlag. ISBN 3-7940-3017-6.
- Marković, Dragan; Kržavac, Savo (1985). Zašto su smenjivani [Why Were They Replaced?] (in Serbo-Croatian). Partizanska knj.
- Martinović, Savo (1970). Deveti kongres Saveza komunista Jugoslavije, Beograd, 11-13. III.1969 [Ninth Congress of the League of Communists of Yugoslavia, Belgrade, 11-13. III.1969] (in Serbo-Croatian). League of Communists of Yugoslavia.
- Nešović, Slobodan (1977). Diplomatska igra oko Jugoslavije 1944–1945. Stvarnost. ISBN 978-3-030-54951-0.
- Nešović, Slobodan (1981). Stvaranje nove Jugoslavije: 1941–1945 [Creation of the New Yugoslavia: 1941–1945] (in Serbo-Croatian). Sarajevo: Mladost. OCLC 444838775.
- Opačić, Nine (1968). Društveno-političke zajednice: Socijalističke republike i autonomme pokrajine [Socio-Political Communities: Socialist Republics and Autonomous Provinces] (in Serbo-Croatian). Međunarodna štampa-Interpress.
- Petković, Aleksandar (1988). Političke borbe za novu Jugoslaviju od Drugog AVNOJ-a do prvog Ustava [Political Struggles for a New Yugoslavia From the Second AVNOJ to the first Constitution] (in Serbo-Croatian). Jugoslovenska revija.
- Rajović, Radošin, ed. (1970). Jugoslovenski savremenici: Ko je ko u Jugoslaviji [Yugoslav Contemporaries: Who's Who in Yugoslavia] (in Serbo-Croatian). Hronometar.
- S̆iljegović, Bos̆ko (1958). Vojna enciklopedija [Military Encyclopedia] (in Serbo-Croatian). Redakcija Vojne enciklopedije.
- Staff writer, ed. (1966). Svjetski almanah [World Almanac] (in Serbo-Croatian). Vol. 4. Novinsko izdavačko poduzeće.
- Staff writer, ed. (1965). VIII Kongres Saveza Komunista Jugoslavije Beograd, 7–13. decembra 1964.: stenog̈rafske beleške [VIII Congress of the Union of Communists of Yugoslavia Belgrade, 7–13 December 1964: shorthand notes] (in Serbo-Croatian). Vol. 3. Kultura.
- Staff writer, ed. (1953). VI kongres Komunističke partije Jugoslavije: 2-7 novembra 1952: stenografske beleške [VI Congress of the Communist Party of Yugoslavia] (in Serbo-Croatian). Kultura.
- Staff writer, ed. (1948). Odluke V. kongresa Komunističke Partije Jugoslavije [Decisions of the Fifth Congress of the Communist Party of Yugoslavia] (in Serbo-Croatian). Kultura.
- Tito, Josip Broz (1982). Damjanović, Pero; Vujošević, Ubavka (eds.). Sabrana djela: Oktobar 1940-April 1941 [Selected Works: 1940 – April 1941] (in Serbo-Croatian). Institut za savremenu istoriju.
- Stroynowski, Juliusz, ed. (1989a). Who's Who in the Socialist Countries of Europe: A–H. K. G. Saur Verlag. ISBN 3-598-10719-6.
- Stroynowski, Juliusz, ed. (1989b). Who's Who in the Socialist Countries of Europe: I–O. K. G. Saur Verlag. ISBN 3-598-10719-6.
- Stroynowski, Juliusz, ed. (1989c). Who's Who in the Socialist Countries of Europe: P–Z. K. G. Saur Verlag. ISBN 3-598-10719-6.
- Zalar, Charles, ed. (1961). Yugoslav Communism: A Critical Study. United States Government Printing Office. Archived from the original on 11 June 2023.
