= Milan Vukša =

Highly decorated Yugoslav WW2 hero

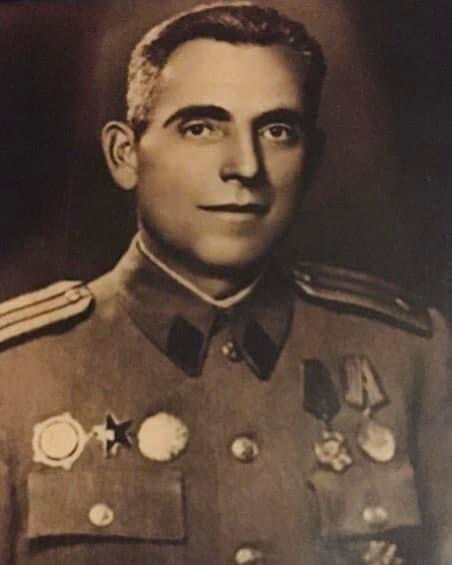
- Milan Vukša official portrait
- Born: 23 July 1903; Vrtoče (part of Petrovac), Bosnia and Herzegovina under Austro-Hungarian rule
- Died: 3 April 1980 (aged 76); Sarajevo, Socialist Federal Republic of Yugoslavia
- Burial place: Bare Cemetery, Sarajevo, Bosnia and Herzegovina
- Children: 5
- Military career
- Allegiance: Kingdom of Yugoslavia; (Socialist Federal Republic of Yugoslavia) SFR Yugoslavia
- Branch: Yugoslav Army (1929–41); National Liberation Army and Partisan Detachments of Yugoslavia (1941–45); Yugoslav People's Army (1945–1975)
- Service years: 1941–1945; 1945–1975
- Rank: Battalion commander (NLA); Lieutenant Colonel (JNA)
- Commands: Third Krajina Brigade
- War Battles: World War II; Kozara Offensive; Operation Weiss; Operation Schwarz
- Awards: Order of the Partisan Star (Yugoslavia); Order of the Republic; Order of Merits for the People; Order of Brotherhood and Unity; Commemorative Medal of the Partisans of 1941; Order of Bravery (Yugoslavia)

Milan Vukša (1903—1980) was a prominent figure in the National Liberation Army and Partisan Detachments of Yugoslavia resistance during World War II and a highly decorated sub-colonel (Lieutenant colonel) of the Yugoslav People's Army.

== Personal life ==
Milan Vukša was born in 1903 (or possibly 1906, according to some sources) in the village of Vrtoče, near Petrovac. He was the son of Miloš Vukša and Ruža Janjić. Raised in a rural family, he worked as a miner before the war, spending time in the Trepča Mines and in Belgian mines. He also served in the gendarmerie of the Royal Yugoslav Army of the Kingdom of Yugoslavia.

Vukša married twice. His first wife, Ruža, died in a traffic accident in 1966. They had four children: Vaso Vukša, Dušan Vukša, Mirjana Grandov (née Vukša) and Dušanka Birg (née Vukša). His second wife, Radojka (née Dodik) from Sanski Most, was 22 years younger. They had one daughter, Olga, who has a son named Željko Vukša-Fejzić.

== World War II ==
Following the Axis invasion of Yugoslavia in 1941, Milan Vukša actively participated in the preparations for the armed uprising. From the outset, he engaged in insurgent and guerrilla warfare. Throughout the war, Vukša served as a member of the Third Krajina Brigade, demonstrating exceptional leadership qualities. This led to his election as the first political commissar of the company, even before joining the League of Communists of Yugoslavia in 1942.

During his time in the Partisan movement, Vukša participated in significant battles, including the Kozara Offensive, Battle of the Neretva, Battle of Sutjeska and the liberation of Glamoč and Livno. He held various positions within the brigade, progressing from a regular soldier to the rank of battalion commander.

== Post-War Career and Legacy ==
After the war, Milan Vukša continued his military career in the Yugoslav People's Army (JNA). He retired as a Lieutenant Colonel (Serbo-Croatian: potpukovnik), having served with distinction. Vukša receiving numerous awards for his contributions to the Partisan resistance, including the Order of the Partisan Star, Order of the Republic, the Order of Merits for the People, and the Order of Brotherhood and Unity.

He documented his experiences during the war in the memoir collection "Petrovac in the People's Liberation War" through which his legacy as a courageous fighter and dedicated leader lives on, inspiring future generations.

He died in Sarajevo on April 3rd 1980 and was entombed in the Bare Cemetery.
