= Zadar Basketball Tournament =

Basketball tournament in Croatia

Zadar basketball tournament
- Sport: Basketball
- Founded: 2014; 12 years ago
- First season: 2014
- Folded: 2019; 7 years ago
- No. of teams: 4–6
- Country: Croatia
- Venue: Krešimir Ćosić Hall
- Most titles: 4 (Turkey) Fenerbahçe

The Zadar Basketball Tournament (Croatian: Zadarski košarkaški turnir) was an invitational basketball competition played in the summer between Croatian and international clubs in Zadar, Croatia. The tournament was held annually from 2014 to 2019.

Fenerbahçe Beko won the most of tournament titles. Only Fenerbahçe Beko Basketball, Darüşşafaka, and Anadolu Efes Pilsen won any of the tournament titles since the inaugural season.

== History ==
The Tournament was held annually every September. The first season was inaugurated in 2014. It is played in the Krešimir Ćosić Hall.

== List of winners ==
Year	Teams	Champion	Runner-up	Score
2014	6	(Turkey) Fenerbahçe Beko	(Croatia) Cedevita	75–67
2015	6	(Turkey) Fenerbahçe Beko	(Germany) Bayern Munich	76–55
2016	6	(Turkey) Darüşşafaka	(Turkey) Fenerbahçe Beko	75–65
2017	6	(Turkey) Fenerbahçe Beko	(Russia) CSKA Moscow	76–72
2018	6	(Turkey) Fenerbahçe Beko	(Russia) CSKA Moscow	86–76
2019	4	(Turkey) Anadolu Efes Pilsen	(Germany) Alba Berlin	92–74

== Performance by club ==
Club	Wins	Runners-up	Win years	Runners-up years
(Turkey) Fenerbahçe	4	1	2014, 2015, 2017, 2018	2016
(Turkey) Darüşşafaka	1	0	2016	
(Turkey) Anadolu Efes Pilsen	1	0	2019	
(Russia) CSKA Moscow	0	2		2017, 2018
(Croatia) Cedevita	0	1		2014
(Germany) Bayern Munich	0	1		2015
(Germany) Alba Berlin	0	1		2019

== See also ==
- Mirza Delibašić Memorial
