= 1st Central Committee =

1st Central Committee may refer to:

- Central Committee of the 1st Congress of the Russian Social Democratic Labour Party, 1898–1903
- Central Committee of the 1st Congress of the Communist Party of Bosnia and Herzegovina, 1948–1954
- 1st Central Committee of the Communist Party of Cuba, 1975–1980
- 1st Central Committee of the Lao People's Revolutionary Party, 1955–1972
- 1st Central Committee of the Indochinese Communist Party, 1935–1951
- Central Committee of the 1st Congress of the Socialist Labor Party of Yugoslavia (Communists), 1919–1920
- 1st Central Committee of the Workers' Party of North Korea, 1946–1948
- 1st Central Committee of the Workers' Party of South Korea, 1946–1949
