= Mirza Delibašić =

Bosnian basketball player and coach (1954–2001)

- Delibašić with Real Madrid in the early 1980's

Personal information
- Born: 9 January 1954 Tuzla, PR Bosnia and Herzegovina, FPR Yugoslavia
- Died: 8 December 2001 (aged 47) Sarajevo, Bosnia and Herzegovina
- Listed height: 1.97 m (6 ft 6 in)
- Listed weight: 87 kg (192 lb)

Career information
- NBA draft: 1976: undrafted
- Playing career: 1968–1983
- Position: Shooting guard
- Number: 12
- Coaching career: 1993–1994

Career history

Playing
- 1968–1972: Sloboda Tuzla
- 1972–1980: Bosna
- 1980–1983: Real Madrid
- 1983: Juve Caserta

Coaching
- 1987: Bosna
- 1989: Bosna
- 1992: Bosna
- 1993–1994: Bosnia and Herzegovina

Career highlights
- EuroLeague champion (1979); 3× FIBA European Selection (1978, 1981 2×); FIBA's 50 Greatest Players (1991); Bosnia and Herzegovina Sportsman of the 20th century (2000); 50 Greatest EuroLeague Contributors (2008)
- FIBA Hall of Fame
Medals
Men's basketball
Representing Yugoslavia
World Cup
Bronze medal – third place	1982 Colombia
Gold medal – first place	1978 Philippines
EuroBasket
Silver medal – second place	1981 Czechoslovakia
Bronze medal – third place	1979 Italy
Gold medal – first place	1977 Belgium
Gold medal – first place	1975 Yugoslavia
Summer Olympic Games
Gold medal – first place	1980 Moscow
Silver medal – second place	1976 Montreal
European Championship for Juniors
Gold medal – first place	1972 Yugoslavia	Under-18
European Championship for Cadets
Gold medal – first place	1971 Italy	Under-16

Mirza Delibašić (9 January 1954 – 8 December 2001) was a Bosnian professional basketball player and coach. He is widely considered one of the greatest players in the history of European basketball.

Delibašić was named one of FIBA's 50 Greatest Players in 1991. He was enshrined into the FIBA Hall of Fame in 2007. In 2008, he was named one of the 50 Greatest EuroLeague Contributors.

== Early life ==
Mirza Delibašić was born on 9 January 1954 in Tuzla, PR Bosnia and Herzegovina, FPR Yugoslavia to Izet Delibašić, a native of Kakanj, and Zajkana (née Mehičević) from Ljubuški. Young Mirza took up tennis, excelling at it. By the age of fourteen, he switched to basketball.

== Club career ==
Delibašić, nicknamed Kinđe, led his club Bosna to the EuroLeague Championship in 1979. He played his first games aged 15 for KK Sloboda Dita, Tuzla's basketball club. Three years later, in 1971, he signed a contract with KK Bosna.

After leaving Bosna, Delibašić went to the Spanish Primera División, where he ended up being considered one of the best players ever to play for Real Madrid, along with the likes of Juan Corbalán, Wayne Brabender, Fernando Martín Espina, Fernando Romay, Dražen Petrović, and Arvydas Sabonis.

In his club career, he won numerous titles in European club competitions. In addition to having played together for their Yugoslav national team, Delibašić and Dražen Dalipagić, also played together at Real Madrid. Their performance in a 1983 European Champions Cup game against Cibona in Zagreb, is only one of the many highlights of their careers. In that game, Delibašić scored 26 points and Dalipagić 33. The game appropriately finished with a two-on-one fast-break, with Delibašić making a behind-the-back fake pass to Dalipagić, and passing by a defender for a two-handed dunk at the buzzer. Cibona's fans put aside their team's loss in the game, and showed their appreciation for their performances, with a standing ovation at the end of the game.

=== Career ending ===
In early summer 1983, twenty-nine-year-old Delibašić left Real Madrid and signed with the Italian League club JuveCaserta coached by his former Bosna mentor Bogdan Tanjević.

In August 1983, the team went for preseason training and conditioning to the town of Bormio in the Italian Alps. Following the gruelling altitude training, after coming back south to Caserta, Delibašić suffered a near-fatal brain hemorrhage that would turn out to be career-ending. With Delibašić in critical condition, a private plane was immediately organized to airlift him to the Military Medical Academy (VMA) in Belgrade where he was hospitalized for months. He survived and recovered, but not enough to return to playing professional basketball thus being forced into retirement effective immediately at only the age of twenty nine.

== National team career ==
En route to a place among the greatest European players, Delibašić won every major FIBA tournament with the senior Yugoslavia national team, including: the gold medal at the 1980 Summer Olympics, EuroBasket gold two times (1975 and 1977), and the FIBA World Cup gold at the 1978 FIBA World Championship.

== Coaching career ==
Delibašić briefly managed Bosna on a few occasions following his retirement during the late 1980s and early 1990s. Delibašić lived in Sarajevo throughout the 1992–1996 siege of the city during the Bosnian War. Simultaneously, he coached the newly established Bosnian national basketball team at EuroBasket 1993 in Germany, where they finished in 8th place.

== Personal life ==
=== Marriages ===
In the late 1970s, Delibašić married his girlfriend Branka. The couple had a son Dario born in late December 1979, before divorcing shortly thereafter in 1980 upon Delibašić's move abroad to play with Real Madrid.

By 1984, Delibašić began dating professional basketball player Slavica Šuka, playing with ŽKK Bosna. In summer 1986, with Šuka six months pregnant, the couple married in a civic ceremony in Trebinje with former professional basketball player Zdravko Čečur as the groom's best man. Several months later, in October, the couple had a son named Danko.

=== Children ===
Delibašić's son with Branka, Dario Delibašić, would follow in his father's footsteps by becoming a professional basketball player, spending time with KK Crvena zvezda, KK Zadar, and KK Bosna. In 2015, Dario, by then residing in Sarajevo and pursuing hospitality entrepreneurship via running a restaurant in the city, was tried in absentia in Udine on a drug trafficking charge, allegedly as part of a Balkans-based organized crime group whose members were on trial simultaneously; Dario received a 6-year prison sentence, which he never served due to Bosnia and Herzegovina and Italy not having an extradition treaty. In May 2019, Dario was apprehended by the Sarajevo Canton police on suspicion of being an accomplice in the 20 April 2019 kidnapping of Tamer Kilerdži, a Sarajevo-based nargila bar owner; Dario ended up spending 2 months in prison detention before being released.

=== Death ===
Due to his heavy drinking and smoking, Delibašić final years were marked by persistent health problems that led to his death in 2001 in Sarajevo, aged 47. At a funeral attended by thousands, he was interred next to his close friend—singer Davorin Popović who had died earlier that year—at Bare Cemetery's Alley of Greats.

== Legacy ==
A statue of Delibašić in front of the Mirza Delibašić Hall in Sarajevo, unveiled in 2022

Following Delibašić's death, Skenderija Hall was renamed to the Mirza Delibašić Hall in his honor. The Mirza Delibašić Memorial, an international basketball tournament between clubs, has been held annually since 2005 in Sarajevo.

In December 2018, the Basketball Federation of Bosnia and Herzegovina changed the name of the national cup championship to the Mirza Delibašić Cup.

== Awards and accomplishments ==
=== Professional career ===
- 2× Yugoslav League Champion: (1978, 1980)
- Yugoslav Cup Winner: (1978)
- EuroLeague Champion: (1979)
- FIBA Club World Cup Champion: (1981)
- Spanish League Champion: (1982)
- FIBA's 50 Greatest Players: (1991)
- Bosnia and Herzegovina Sportsman of the 20th century: (2000)
- FIBA Hall of Fame: (2007)
- 50 Greatest EuroLeague Contributors: (2008)

== See also ==
- Yugoslav First Federal Basketball League career stats leaders
- Mirza Delibašić Memorial
