= Central Committee of the 5th Congress of the League of Communists of Bosnia and Herzegovina =

5th Central Committee
- Party emblem

11 January 1969 – 26 March 1974 (5 years, 74 days) Overview
- Type: Highest organ
- Election: 5th Congress

Members
- Total: 49 members
- Newcomers: 32 members
- Old: 17 members (4th)
- Reelected: 19 members (6th)

This electoral term of the Central Committee was elected by the 5th Congress of the League of Communists of Bosnia and Herzegovina in 1969, and was in session until the gathering of the 6th Congress in 1974.

== Members ==
Members of the Central Committee of the 5th Congress of the League of Communists of Bosnia and Herzegovina
Name	4th	6th	Birth	PM	Death	Nationality	Gender	Ref.
Mato Andrić	Old	Elected	1928	1945	2015	Croat	Male	
Živko Babić	New	Elected	1929	1947	2000	Serb	Male	
Vinko Bakula	New	Not	1942	1965	?	Croat	Male	
Jelica Blagojević	New	Not	1946	1965	?	Serb	Female	
Ivica Blažević	New	Elected	1929	1950	?	Croat	Male	
Brano Bosnić	New	Not	1926	1944	?	Serb	Male	
Ahmed Čatić	Old	Not	1921	1944	2003	Muslim	Male	
Savo Čečur	New	Elected	1929	1947	2005	Serb	Male	
Hiba Čehajić	New	Not	1925	1945	1999	Muslim	Female	
Abaz Deronja	New	Elected	1920	1938	2003	Muslim	Male	
Nijaz Dizdarević	New	Not	1920	1942	1989	Muslim	Male	
Petar Dodik	Old	Not	1925	1943	2015	Serb	Male	
Miroslav Đogo	New	Not	1934	1953	?	Serb	Male	
Ratomir Dugonjić	Old	Not	1916	1937	1987	Serb	Male	
Hajrudin Đulbić	Old	Not	1931	1949	2014	Muslim	Male	
Rade Galeb	New	Not	1927	1943	?	Serb	Male	
Hasan Grabčanović	New	Elected	1918	1940	1996	Muslim	Male	
Jovica Grković	New	Not	1919	1942	?	Serb	Male	
Tahir Hadžić	New	Not	1928	1945	?	Muslim	Male	
Franjo Herljević	New	Elected	1915	1940	1998	Croat	Male	
Esad Horozić	Old	Not	1929	1948	2019	Muslim	Male	
Hrvoje Ištuk	New	Elected	1935	1954	2002	Croat	Male	
Hatidža Karabeg	Old	Not	1922	1945	1999	Muslim	Female	
Alija Latić	New	Elected	1934	1951	?	Muslim	Male	
Sreten Lopandić	Old	Not	1920	1942	1998	Serb	Male	
Milan Lovrić	New	Not	1938	1958	2011	Croat	Male	
Seid Maglajlija	New	Not	1940	1958	2019	Muslim	Male	
Nedeljko Mandić	New	Elected	1936	1958	2018	Serb	Male	
Munir Mesihović	Old	Elected	1928	1946	2016	Muslim	Male	
Niko Mihaljević	Old	Elected	1919	1941	2005	Croat	Male	
Cvijetin Mijatović	Old	Not	1913	1934	1993	Serb	Male	
Branko Mikulić	Old	Elected	1928	1943	1994	Croat	Male	
Marko Musić	New	Not	1936	1958	?	Croat	Male	
Mehmed Mutevlić	New	Not	1926	1945	?	Muslim	Male	
Petar Oreč	New	Not	1925	1945	2010	Croat	Male	
Ferdo Palac	Old	Not	1932	1954	1980	Croat	Male	
Hamdija Pozderac	Old	Elected	1924	1943	1988	Muslim	Male	
Radmila Praštalo	New	Not	1938	1959	?	Serb	Female	
Danica Raković	New	Not	1928	1945	?	Serb	Female	
Luka Reljić	New	Not	1937	1957	2019	Serb	Male	
Milanko Renovica	New	Elected	1928	1947	2013	Serb	Male	
Lazar Savičić	New	Not	1931	1958	1987	Serb	Male	
Milan Škoro	New	Elected	1928	1951	1991	Serb	Male	
Vehid Smajlović	Old	Not	1928	1945	2002	Muslim	Male	
Uglješa Stević	New	Elected	1928	1959	?	Serb	Male	
Arif Tanović	New	Elected	1925	1943	2010	Muslim	Male	
Kemal Tarabar	New	Not	1922	1949	?	Muslim	Male	
Stanko Tomić	Old	Elected	1926	1943	?	Serb	Male	
Bekto Zonjić	Old	Not	1928	1951	?	Muslim	Male	

== Bibliography ==
=== Books ===
- Janković, Slavko, ed. (1957). Ko je ko u Jugoslaviji: biografski podaci o jugoslovenskim savremenicima [Who's Who in Yugoslavia: Biographical Information About Yugoslav Contemporaries] (in Serbo-Croatian). Vol. 3. Izd. "Sedme sile".
- Lewytzkyj, Borys; Stroynowski, Juliusz, eds. (1978). Who's Who in the Socialist Countries. K. G. Saur Verlag. ISBN 3-7940-3017-6.
- Opačić, Nine (1968). Društveno-političke zajednice: Socijalističke republike i autonomme pokrajine [Socio-Political Communities: Socialist Republics and Autonomous Provinces] (in Serbo-Croatian). Međunarodna štampa-Interpress.
- Rajović, Radošin, ed. (1970). Jugoslovenski savremenici: Ko je ko u Jugoslaviji [Yugoslav Contemporaries: Who's Who in Yugoslavia] (in Serbo-Croatian). Hronometar.
- Staff writer, ed. (1969). Peti kongres Saveza komunista Bosne i Hercegovine Sarajevo, 9–11. januara 1969 [Fifth Congress of the League of Communists of Bosnia and Herzegovina Sarajevo, January 9–11, 1969] (in Serbo-Croatian). League of Communists of Bosnia and Herzegovina.
- Stroynowski, Juliusz, ed. (1989a). Who's Who in the Socialist Countries of Europe: A–H. K. G. Saur Verlag. ISBN 3-598-10719-6.
- Stroynowski, Juliusz, ed. (1989b). Who's Who in the Socialist Countries of Europe: I–O. K. G. Saur Verlag. ISBN 3-598-10719-6.
- Stroynowski, Juliusz, ed. (1989c). Who's Who in the Socialist Countries of Europe: P–Z. K. G. Saur Verlag. ISBN 3-598-10719-6.
- Zalar, Charles, ed. (1961). Yugoslav Communism: A Critical Study. United States Government Printing Office. Archived from the original on 11 June 2023.

=== Newspapers ===
- Staff writer (12 January 1969). "Руководство СК Босне и Херцеговине" [The Leadership of the LC of Bosnia and Herzegovina]. Borba (in Serbo-Croatian). Socialist Alliance of Working People: 4–5.
