= Bare Cemetery =

Cemetery in Sarajevo

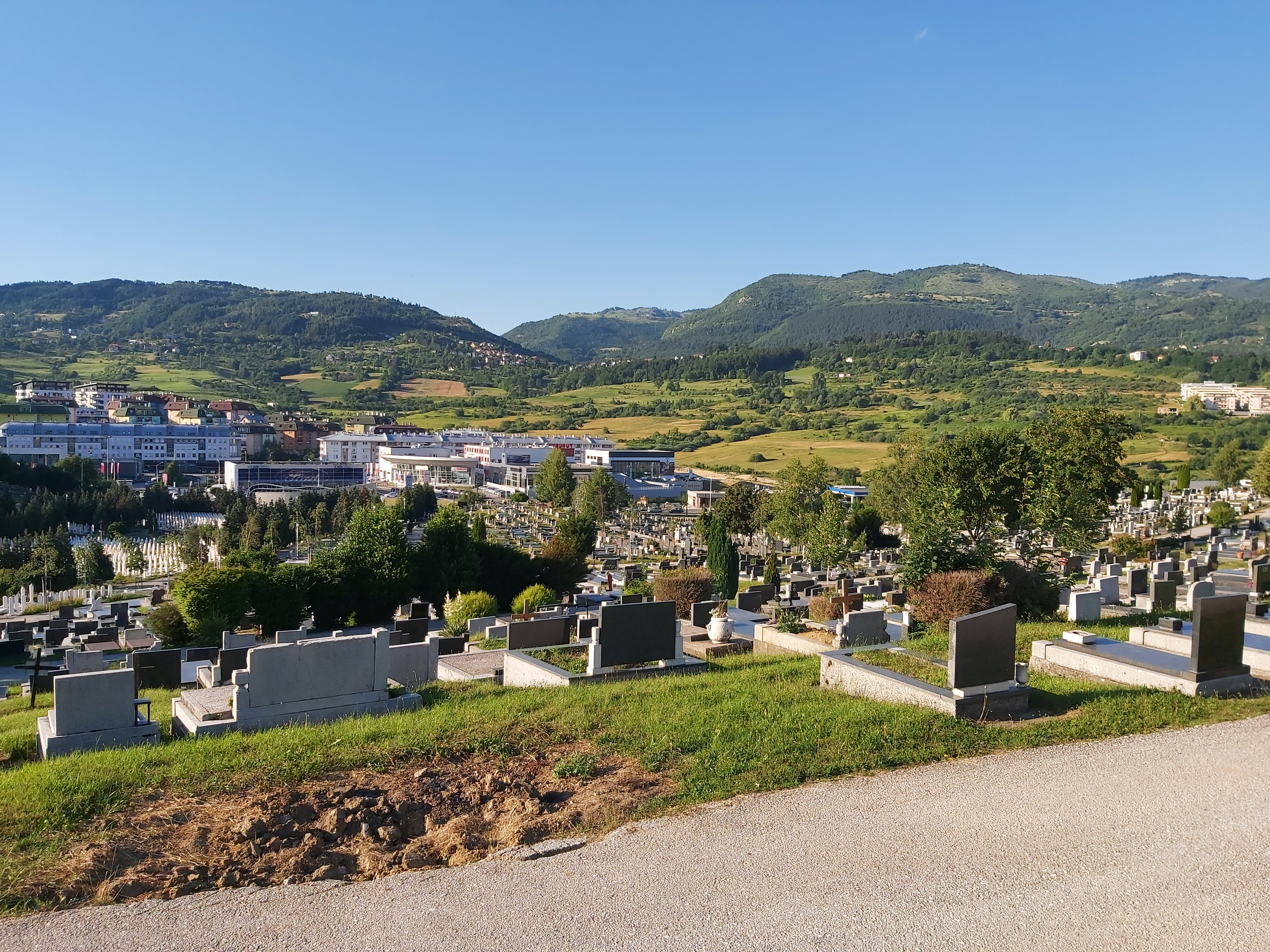
- Bare Cemetery pictured in 2020
- Interactive map of Bare Cemetery

Details
- Established: 1965
- Location: Sarajevo
- Country: Bosnia and Herzegovina
- Coordinates: 43.523°N 18.235°E
- Type: Public
- Owned by: City of Sarajevo
- Website: www.pokop.ba

The Bare Cemetery is a cemetery complex in Sarajevo, Bosnia and Herzegovina opened in 1965, with the first funeral and interment occurring on 3 January 1966.

The central part of the cemetery is a spacious plateau with a staircase and a porch that connects the Catholic, Orthodox, Muslim, Jewish and atheist chapels, designed by Smiljan Klaić, and the frescoes in the porch were painted by Rizah Štetić.

== Burials ==
- Hasan Brkić (1913–1965), politician and partisan
- Josip Bulat (1905–1970), footballer and football manager
- Jurislav Korenić (1915–1974), theater and television director, classical musician, theorist, art critic and playwright.
- Milan Vukša (1903–1980), prominent figure in the Yugoslav Partisans resistance and a highly decorated officer of the Yugoslav People's Army
- Nerćes Novo (1928–1983), footballer
- Dražen Ričl (1962–1986), rock musician
- Goran Čengić (1946–1992), handball player
- Milan Ribar (1930–1996), footballer and football manager
- Davorin Popović (1946–2001), singer-songwriter
- Mirza Delibašić (1954–2001), basketball player
- Slobodan Kovačević (1946–2004), rock guitarist
- Žan Marolt (1964–2009), actor
- Ines Fančović (1925–2011), actress
- Vaso Radić (1923–2011), politician and former mayor of Sarajevo
- Kemal Monteno (1948–2015), singer-songwriter
- Srđan Dizdarević (1952–2016), journalist, diplomat, and activist
- Božidar Matić (1937–2016), politician and former chairman of the Council of Ministers
- Dubravko Lovrenović (1956–2017), historian and writer
- Anur Hadžiomerspahić (1971–2017), artist and graphic designer
- Alija Behmen (1940–2018), politician and former mayor of Sarajevo
- Muhamed Filipović (1929–2020), writer, essayist, theorist and philosopher
- Beba Selimović (1936–2020), folk and sevdalinka singer
- Emina Zečaj (1929–2020), sevdalinka singer
- Jovan Divjak (1937–2021), Bosnian army general
- Ivica Osim (1941–2022), footballer and football manager
- Mirsad Tuka (1965–2023), actor
- Josip Pejaković (1948–2025), actor and writer
- Halid Bešlić (1953–2025), folk singer
