= Slobodan Kovačević =

Yugoslav musician, guitarist and composer (1946–2004)

Slobodan "Bodo" Kovačević (29 December 1946 – 22 March 2004) was a rock guitarists in former Yugoslavia. He began his musical career in the early sixties with the Sarajevo band "Wanderers" and few years later in the mid sixties joined Indexi, where Davorin Popović was already a singer.

== Biography ==
In 1978, together with other members of Indexi, he received the April 6 Award from the city of Sarajevo. That same year, he won the JRT (Yugoslav Radio and Television) award for his thematic masterpiece concept album "Dark-Blue River", which was declared album of the year in Yugoslavia. In 2004, he received the Davorin Award for best instrumentalist in Bosnia and Herzegovina.

== Music career ==
He founded the group Lutalice ("The Wanderers") in 1963, which also included rhythmic guitarist Slobodan M. Kovačević (who later founded the group More), bassist Duško Čorlija, drummer Vojo Šimšić and vocalist Zoran Vidović - Cojo. Additional members were singers Selma Koluder and Gordana Magaš, who later became a Sarajevo ballerina and choreographer. The second lineup consisted of bassist Fadil Redžić and drummer Miroslav Šaranović, both of whom later joined Indexi. A recording from this period is Slobodan Kovačević's first instrumental composition "Snježni kristali" (Snow Crystals), which was recorded in the studios of Radio Sarajevo on 16 April 1965.

Kovačević joined Indexi in the summer of 1965, and Fadil Redžić, his Lutalice bandmate, joined soon after. Both of them, along with the singer Davorin Popović, stayed in the band as core members until Popović's death 2001.

The first major composition Bodo Kovačević made for Indexi was titled "Pružam ruke" (I Reach Out), with lyrics by Nikola Borota. It was written in late 1966 and was recorded at Radio Sarajevo on 13 February 1967. With this composition, Indexi took part in the Yugoslav selection for the Eurovision Song Contest, which was organized in Ljubljana (the winner was Slovenian singer Lado Leskovar with Vse rože sveta).

Slobodan Kovačević had worked for other artists and participated in various projects outside of pop and rock music. Among other things, he played guitar and participated in the arrangement of Josipa Lisac's first album, "Dnevnik jedne ljubavi" (Diary of a Love) in 1973. He composed the theme music for the ceremony of the 1984 Winter Olympics in Sarajevo, collaborated with Esad Arnautalić on his project "Muzika razpoloženja" (Mood Music), wrote the music for the play "Mandragola" for "Chamber Theatre 55" in Sarajevo and "Posljednja potraga za zlatom" (Last Quest for Gold) for the National Theatre in Sarajevo. In the last two years of his life, he was the music producer of BH Eurosong.

At the beginning of the war in Bosnia and Herzegovina, he moved to Prague and returned to Sarajevo after the Dayton Agreement in 1995. In late March 1998, Indexi performed in Podgorica and Belgrade.

After the death of Davorin Popović in 2001, he devoted himself to jazz music and joined the Sinan Alimanović Quintet. He also played in the Dance Orchestra of Bosnia and Herzegovina.

Slobodan Kovačević died on 22 March 2004 in Sarajevo and was buried in the Bare Cemetery in the "Alley of Greats", close to his bandmate and singer Davorin Popović. From 2006, in his honor, the Bodo Kovačević Award was founded for the best guitarist.

== Slobodan Kovačević's songs ==
- Pružam ruke (I Reach Out)
- Prazne noći, a beskrajni dani (Empty Nights and Endless Days)
- Plima (Tide)
- Negdje na kraju u zatišju (Somewhere at the End of the Lull)
- Balada (Ballad, with Fadil Redžić)
- Ana (Hannah)
- Budi kao more (Be Like the Sea)
- Brod (The Ship)
- Ja odlazim sutra (I'm Leaving Tomorrow)
- Crno bijela pjesma (Black and White Song)
- Da l' smo ljudi (Are We the People)
- Dvojnik (Doppelganger)
- I bit ću lud (I Will Be Mad)
- I još deset (And Ten More)
- I tvoje će proći (And Yours Will Be Gone)
- Kameni cvjetovi (Stone Flowers)
- Leptiru moj (My Butterfly)
- Zašto je prazan čitav svijet (Why Is the Whole World Empty)
- Mjesto pod suncem (My Place Under the Sun)
- Modra rijeka (Dark-Blue River)
- More (Sea)
- Najljepše stvari (Most Beautiful Things)
- Noćni susreti (Night Encounters)
- Oko malih stvari svađamo se mi (The Small Things We Argue About)
- Pogrešan broj (Wrong Number)
- Poslije tebe (After You)
- Prošli dani (Last days)
- Pustinja (Desert)
- Ruže i suze (Roses and Tears)
- Samo jednom (Only One)
- Samoćo, ljubavi moja (Loneliness, My Love)
- U inat godinama (In Spite of the Years)
- Zamak (Castle, instrumental)

Awards and achievements
Preceded by None	Pjesma Mediterana winner 1992	Succeeded by Mićo Vujović
