= Abdulah Mutapčić =

Yugoslav Bosnian politician

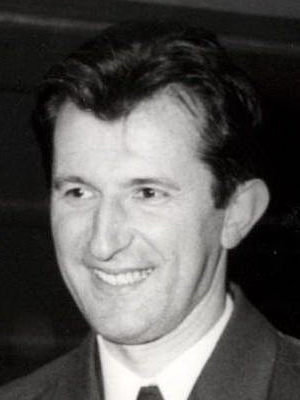

8th President of the League of Communists of Bosnia and Herzegovina
- In office May 1988 – 29 June 1989
- Preceded by: Milan Uzelac
- Succeeded by: Nijaz Duraković

Mayor of Zenica
- In office 1970–1974

Personal details
- Born: 1 January 1932 Zenica, Kingdom of Yugoslavia
- Died: 29 October 2013 (aged 81) Sarajevo, Bosnia and Herzegovina
- Party: SKJ (until 1990)
- Occupation: Politician

Abdulah Mutapčić (Serbo-Croatian Cyrillic: Абдулах Мутапчић; born 1 January 1932 – 29 October 2013) was a Bosnian politician who was the President of the League of Communists of Bosnia and Herzegovina from 1988 to 1989. He also served as mayor of Zenica from 1970 to 1974.

== Biography ==
Mutapčić was born on 1 January 1932 in Zenica, Kingdom of Yugoslavia. From 1970 to 1974, he was the Mayor of Zenica. Later on in his life, Mutapčić served as the President of the Presidency of the Central Committee of the League of the League of Communists of Bosnia and Herzegovina from May 1988 until 29 June 1989.

It was during his tenure as President of the Central Committee that tensions between the republics of SFR Yugoslavia came to a head, in which he attempted to navigate SR Bosnia and Herzegovina around the growing tensions between SR Croatia and SR Serbia.

He died on 29 October 2013.

Political offices
Preceded by Milan Uzelac	Post; President of the League of Communists of Bosnia and Herzegovina; 1988–1989	Succeeded by Nijaz Duraković
