= Davorin Popović =

Bosnian singer and songwriter (1946–2001)

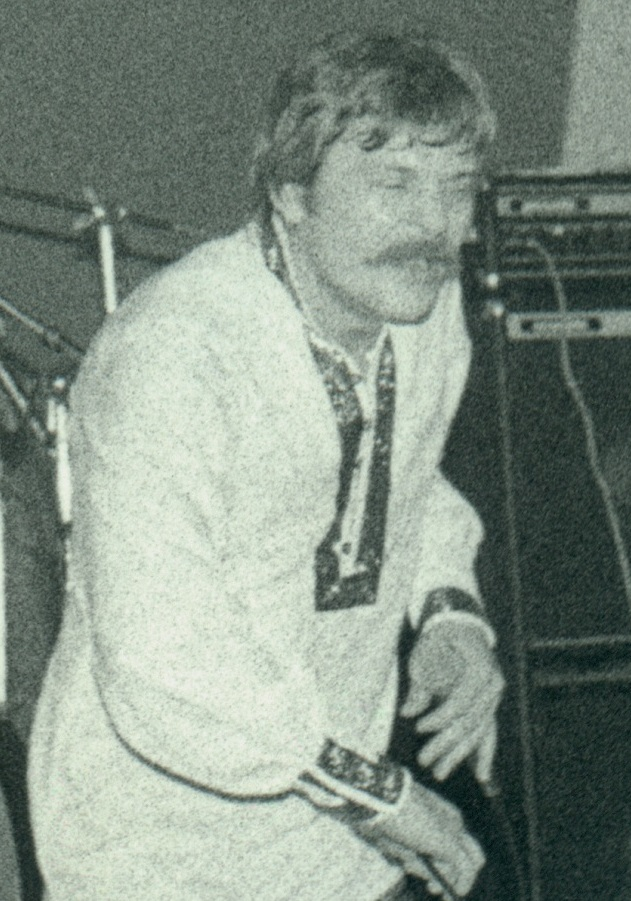
- Popović performing in 1979

Background information
- Born: 23 September 1946; Sarajevo, PR Bosnia-Herzegovina, FPR Yugoslavia
- Died: 18 June 2001 (aged 54) Sarajevo, Bosnia and Herzegovina
- Genres: Rock; progressive rock; psychedelic rock; pop
- Occupations: Singer; songwriter
- Instrument: Vocals
- Years active: 1962–2001
- Labels: Jugoton; Diskoton
- Formerly of: Indexi
- Website: Official website

Davorin Popović (23 September 1946 – 18 June 2001) was a Bosnian singer and songwriter. Born in Sarajevo and well known throughout the former Yugoslavia, he is considered to be one of the greatest rock singers of the region.

Popović was the lead singer and frontman of the progressive and pop rock band Indexi throughout most of their career. The band would become founders of a specific music style in the former Yugoslavia, known as "Sarajevo pop-rock school", which later influenced other bands and singers in Sarajevo and other parts of Yugoslavia.

== Biography ==
Popović was born on 23 September 1946 in Sarajevo, FPR Yugoslavia, present-day Bosnia and Herzegovina to Croatian parents. His close lifelong friendship with renowned basketball player Mirza Delibašić led to the duo becoming inextricably linked to the bohemian lifestyle of Sarajevo. In his youth, Popović was a successful basketball player himself. During his career, he earned nicknames including "Pimpek", "Davor", "Dačo" or simply "Pjevač" (literally the Singer) due to his unique voice.

In parallel with his work in Indexi, Popović pursued a solo career between 1975 and 1996, albeit in a non-continuous manner. On most of his solo works one or another line-up of Indexi played as backing studio musicians, so his solo career is closely related with that of the band itself. This was also stressed in the album titles when they are usually credited to "Davorin and Indexi" or similar. During the siege of Sarajevo in 1995, he represented Bosnia and Herzegovina at the Eurovision Song Contest in Dublin with the song "Dvadeset prvi vijek" ("21st Century"), finishing in 19th place of the 23 entries.

Some of the most popular songs commonly associated with Indexi were actually issued as Popović's solo works, such as "I pad je let" ("Even a fall is a flight") or "U tebi se žena rađa" ("You're Becoming a Woman") from his debut LP Svaka je ljubav ista (osim one prave) (Every Love Is the Same (Except The True One)) from 1976, which was oddly the first studio album with entirely new songs that was recorded by Indexi as a group, having previously issuing singles and compilations rather than studio albums. It was however released as his solo effort because the band was working on their progressive masterpiece "Modra Rijeka" ("Dark-Blue River") at that time.

Music on Popović's solo albums is generally closer to mainstream pop rock and easy listening schlager songs, although some retained the trademark Indexi rock formula.

== Death and legacy ==
Popović died at the age 54 on 18 June 2001 in Sarajevo, due to complications caused by pancreatic cancer. As a sign of the highest appreciation of the city for his artistic work, he was interred in the Alley of Greats at Bare Cemetery, a prestigious place reserved for exceptional Sarajevo citizens. He is interred next to his friend and bandmate, the lead guitarist of Indexi Slobodan "Bodo" Kovačević and Mirza Delibašić.

The Bosnian music award Indexi, initially named Davorin, was named in his honor, as well as a Sarajevo basketball tournament named Dačo.

== Solo discography ==
=== Singles ===
- "Ja sam uvijek htio ljudima da dam" / "Crveno svjetlo" (PGP RTB, 1976)

=== Albums ===
- Svaka je ljubav ista osim one prave (Diskoton, 1976)
- S tobom dijelim sve (Diskoton, 1984)

Preceded by Alma & Dejan with Ostani kraj mene	Bosnia and Herzegovina in the Eurovision Song Contest; 1995	Succeeded by Amila Glamočak with Za našu ljubav
