= Slavica Šuka =

Yugoslav and Bosnian basketball player

Slavica Šuka - Delibašić
Personal information
- Born: 6 August 1959 (age 67) Zenica, SFR Yugoslavia
- Listed height: 1.75 m (5 ft 9 in)
- Listed weight: 63 kg (139 lb)
- Position: Shooting guard

Slavica Šuka, married Delibašić (born 6 August 1959 in Zenica) is a former Yugoslav and Bosnian basketball player.

== Personal life ==
Slavica is a wife of former Yugoslav and Bosnian basketball player Mirza Delibašić.
