= Mirza Delibašić Memorial =

Basketball tournament in Bosnia and Herzegovina

- Sport: Basketball
- Founded: 2005; 21 years ago
- First season: 2005
- Owner: Bosna
- Claim to fame: Honor to Mirza Delibašić
- No. of teams: 4
- Country: Bosnia and Herzegovina
- Most recent champion: (Slovenia) Cedevita Olimpija
- Most titles: 2 (Turkey) Efes Pilsen (Bosnia and Herzegovina) Bosna

Mirza Delibašić Memorial (Bosnian: Memorijal Mirza Delibašić) is an international basketball tournament between clubs, which has been held annually since 2005 by Bosna and takes place in Sarajevo, Bosnia and Herzegovina each summer. It was named in honor of basketball player Mirza Delibašić.

== Winners ==
Season	Nat.	Team	Ref.
2005	(Turkey)	Efes Pilsen	
2006	(Serbia)	Partizan	
2007	(Bosnia and Herzegovina)	Bosna ASA BH Telecom	
2008	(Bosnia and Herzegovina)	Bosna ASA BH Telecom	
2009	(Turkey)	Fenerbahçe	
2010	(Turkey)	Efes Pilsen	
2011	(Montenegro)	Budućnost	
2012	(North Macedonia)	MZT Skopje	
2013	(Bosnia and Herzegovina)	Igokea	
2014	(Turkey)	Türk Telekom	
2015	(Turkey)	Trabzonspor Medical Park	
2016	(Croatia)	Cedevita	
2017	(Montenegro)	Budućnost VOLI	
2018	(Bosnia and Herzegovina)	Kakanj	
2019	(Slovenia)	Cedevita Olimpija	
2020	Canceled due to COVID-19 pandemic		
2021	Not held		
2022	Not held		
2023	(Croatia)	Cibona	
2024	(Italy)	Dinamo Sassari	
