= Nijaz Duraković =

Member of the Presidency of RBiH from 1993 to 1996

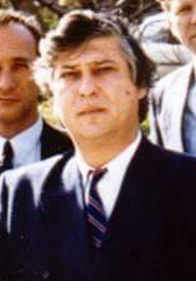

Bosniak member of the Presidency of the Republic of Bosnia and Herzegovina
- In office 20 October 1993 – 5 October 1996 Serving with Alija Izetbegović
- Preceded by: Fikret Abdić
- Succeeded by: Alija Izetbegović

9th President of the League of Communists of Bosnia and Herzegovina
- In office 29 June 1989 – 24 February 1991
- Preceded by: Abdulah Mutapčić
- Succeeded by: Office abolished
Parliamentary offices
Member of the House of Representatives
In office 9 December 2002 – 20 November 2006
Constituency	3rd Electoral Unit FBiH
Additional positions
President of the Social Democratic Party
In office 27 December 1992 – 6 April 1997
Preceded by	Office established
Succeeded by	Zlatko Lagumdžija

Personal details
- Born: 1 January 1949 Stolac, PR Bosnia and Herzegovina, FPR Yugoslavia
- Died: 29 January 2012 (aged 63) Sarajevo, Bosnia and Herzegovina
- Party: Social Democratic Union (2006–2012)
- Other political affiliations: SKJ (1967–1991); Social Democratic Party (1992–2002)
- Education: University of Sarajevo (BA, MA, PhD)

Nijaz Duraković (1 January 1949 – 29 January 2012) was a Bosnian author, intellectual, professor and politician who served as the last president of the League of Communists of Bosnia and Herzegovina from 1989 to 1991. He is widely considered to have been one of the most influential modern authors on sociopolitical issues in the region of his generation.

Duraković served as the Bosniak member of the Presidency of the Republic of Bosnia and Herzegovina alongside Alija Izetbegović from 1993 to 1996, most of it during the Bosnian War. He was the founder of the Social Democratic Party, and served as its first president from 1992 until 1997. He also served as member of the national House of Representatives from 2002 to 2006. Duraković died in January 2012 at the age of 63.

== Political career ==
Duraković was born in Stolac on 1 January 1949 to Hakija and Ćamila. He completed his primary and secondary education there, and then his BA, MA, and PhD degrees in sociology at the University of Sarajevo. He served as the last president of the League of Communists of Bosnia and Herzegovina from 29 June 1989 until 24 February 1991, and as the first president of the Social Democratic Party from 27 December 1992 to 6 April 1997.

On 20 October 1993, Duraković became a member of the Presidency of the Republic of Bosnia and Herzegovina during the Bosnian War, serving alongside Alija Izetbegović until 5 October 1996. In the 2002 general election, he was elected to the national House of Representatives, serving as its member until 20 November 2006.

== Publications ==
Beyond politics, Duraković was widely recognized as one of the country's most prolific authors. His body of work includes 16 books and more than 200 scientific journals and articles which he wrote during his tenure as Senior Professor at the Faculty of Political Science in Sarajevo. Duraković's most prominent book is The Curse of Muslims (Prokletstvo Muslimana).

== Death ==
Duraković died on 29 January 2012 in Sarajevo following a heart attack, at the age of 63.

His death was met with statements of sympathy and tribute from many individuals and organizations. Bosnian Presidency chairman Željko Komšić released a statement upon Duraković's death, describing him as a "great man" and a "successful politician and fighter for Bosnia and Herzegovina." Federal prime minister Nermin Nikšić stated "There will be a gap behind Duraković that will be difficult to fill. Generations that follow his example can learn how to love Bosnia and Herzegovina."

== See also ==
- Nijaz Duraković Park

Political offices
Preceded by Abdulah Mutapčić	President of the League of Communists of Bosnia and Herzegovina; 1989–1991	Office abolished
Preceded by Fikret Abdić	Bosniak member of the Presidency of the Republic of Bosnia and Herzegovina; 1993–1996; Serving with Alija Izetbegović	Succeeded by Alija Izetbegović
Party political offices
Office established	President of the Social Democratic Party; 1992–1997	Succeeded by Zlatko Lagumdžija
