= Vaso Radić =

Politician

Vaso Radić Васо Радић
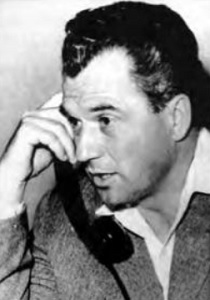

21st Mayor of Sarajevo
- In office 1963–1965
- Preceded by: Lazo Materić
- Succeeded by: Salko Lagumdžija

Personal details
- Born: Vasilije Radić; 14 October 1923 Breza, Kingdom of Serbs, Croats and Slovenes
- Died: 18 December 2011 (aged 88) Sarajevo, Bosnia and Herzegovina
- Resting place: Bare Cemetery, Sarajevo
- Party: SKJ
- Education: University of Belgrade
- Occupation: Politician, football administrator
- Awards: Partisan 1941 Commemorative Medal

Vasilije "Vaso" Radić (Serbo-Croatian Cyrillic: Васо Радић; 14 October 1923 – 18 December 2011) was a Bosnian and Yugoslav politician and former Partisan who served as the 21st mayor of Sarajevo from 1963 to 1965 and Yugoslav general consul in West Germany from 1967 to 1969. After retiring he worked as an author and publicist.

Radić was a holder of the Commemorative Medal of the Partisans of 1941 and was one of the founders of FK Sarajevo, being named president of the club assembly in 1957, holding on to that position until 1959. He was Sarajevo's assembly president once again from 1972 until 1973. As an ethnic Serb living in Sarajevo for most of his life, Radić also lived through the Siege of Sarajevo from 1992 to 1996.

He died on 18 December 2011, aged 88. He had 5 siblings; Gojko, Manojlo, Kristina, Ljubica and Miroslav. Radić was buried on 21 December at the Bare Cemetery in Sarajevo.

== Awards ==
- Commemorative Medal of the Partisans of 1941: 1941

Political offices
Preceded by Lazo Materić	Mayor of Sarajevo; 1963–1965	Succeeded by Salko Lagumdžija
