= Milan Uzelac =

Bosnian politician

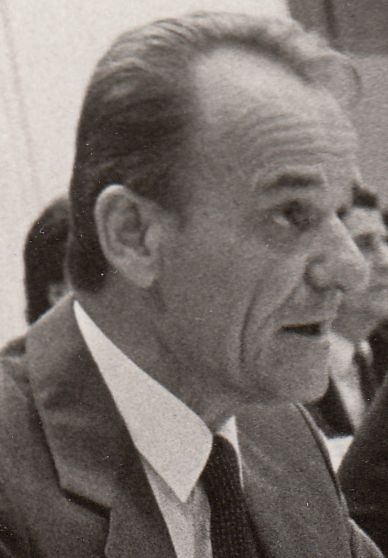

7th President of the League of Communists of Bosnia and Herzegovina
- In office 21 May 1986 – May 1988
- Preceded by: Mato Andrić
- Succeeded by: Abdulah Mutapčić

Personal details
- Born: 28 August 1932 Bihać, Kingdom of Yugoslavia
- Died: 6 June 2005 (aged 72) London, England
- Party: League of Communists (until 1990)
- Education: University of Sarajevo

Milan Uzelac (Serbo-Croatian Cyrillic: Милан Узелац; 28 August 1932 – 6 June 2005) was a Bosnian communist politician who served as the 7th President of the League of Communists of Bosnia and Herzegovina from 1986 to 1988.

== Biography ==
Uzelac was born on 28 August 1932 in Bihać, Kingdom of Yugoslavia. He graduated from the Faculty of Philosophy in Sarajevo.

Uzelac was the president of the Central Committee of the People's Committee of Bosnia and Herzegovina from 1956 until 1963, Secretary for education and culture of Bosnia and Herzegovina from 1963 to 1967, president of the Republic of Education Union of SR Bosnia and Herzegovina, deputy of the Council of Peoples of the Federal Assembly of Yugoslavia from 1969. Later on in his life, he served as President of the Presidency of the Central Committee of the League of Communists of Bosnia and Herzegovina from 21 May 1986 until May 1988.

Uzelac died on 6 July 2005 in London, aged 72.

Political offices
Preceded by Mato Andrić	President of the League of Communists of Bosnia and Herzegovina; 1986–1988	Succeeded by Abdulah Mutapčić
