= Nisim Albahari =

Yugoslav communist

Nisim Albahari (1916 — 1991), was a Yugoslav Partisan, People's Hero of Yugoslavia and political leader in the Socialist Republic of Bosnia and Herzegovina.

== Biography ==
Nisim Albahari was born on January 28, 1916, in the town of Tešanj to a Jewish family. He attended school in Sarajevo, where he was first introduced to revolutionary socialism thought and participated in cultural, sports and political activities.

After finishing school, he continued his revolutionary activities, becoming active in the trade union movement and joining the Communist Party of Yugoslavia in 1935. The following year he was imprisoned for a year by authorities, a sentence he served in Sarajevo, Belgrade's infamous "Glavnjača" prison, and on Adi Ciganliji.

Upon his release in 1937, Albahari returned to his political work, and by the time he returned to Sarajevo following military service, he was a well-known figure within the local communist party. Due to his status, he was arrested in December 1940 and imprisoned in Ivanjica until March 29, 1941.

After the Invasion and Occupation of Yugoslavia Nisim worked actively to organize resistance against the occupying forces. He collected weapons and medical supplies, and later formed one of the first Partisan detachment around Sarajevo.

While organizing Partisan resistance in and around Vareš-Breza, Albahari was captured by the Ustashe and imprisoned in Sarajevo. After facing extreme torture in prison, he escaped with Iso Jovanovic (Communist Party Secretary for BiH), Milutin Djuraskovic and Vas Miskin to liberated territory in the mountainous Bosnian region of Romanija.

While in Romanija, he was named secretary of the communist party for the "Zvezda" squad, where he became well known as a soldier. He participated in several battles during the Liberation of Yugoslavia and fought with several divisions, including the Sixth East Bosnian Brigade. Albahari served in a variety of political roles as well. He was head of the OZNA for the 3rd Corps, as well as the political commisar for Eastern Bosnia.

After the liberation of Yugoslavia, Albahari studied political science in Belgrade. Upon his return to Bosnia, he took on a variety of political roles. He served as President of the Union of Sarajevo Trade Unions, and was a member of both the Communist Party of Yugoslavia's Bosnia and Herzegovina division as well as the Central Committee for the Communist Party of Bosnia and Herzegovina, the latter of which he was a founding member in 1948.

For more than ten years Albahari served on the Central Committee of the Communist Party in a variety of different roles. Additionally, he served as Minister of Labor for the Socialist Republic of Bosnia and Herzegovina and as a member of the Federal Assembly of Yugoslavia.

== Decorations ==
Albahari was the recipient of the Partisan's Commemorative Medal 1941 among other national decorations and awards. He received the Order of the People's Hero on November 27, 1953.

- Order of the People's Hero (1953)
- Order of the People's Liberation (1976)
- Order of the Republic with Golden Wreath (1961)
- Order of Brotherhood and Unity with Golden Wreath
- Order of the Partisan Star with Silver Wreath
- Order of Merits for the People, 2nd class (1946)
- Order of Bravery
- Commemorative Medal of the Partisans of 1941
- Poland:
  - Partisan Cross

== Bibliography ==
- Romano, Jaša (1980). Jevreji Jugoslavije 1941-1945: žrtve genocida i učesnici narodnooslobodilačkog rata, Beograd: Jevrejski Istorijski Muzej, Saveza jevrejskih opština Jugoslavije.
- "Narodni heroji Jugoslavije". Beograd: Mladost. 1975.
- Brka, Amir (2018). Nisim Albahari, tragični revolucionar. Tešanj. ISBN 9789958088254.
