= Commemorative Medal of the Partisans of 1941 =

Yugoslav medal

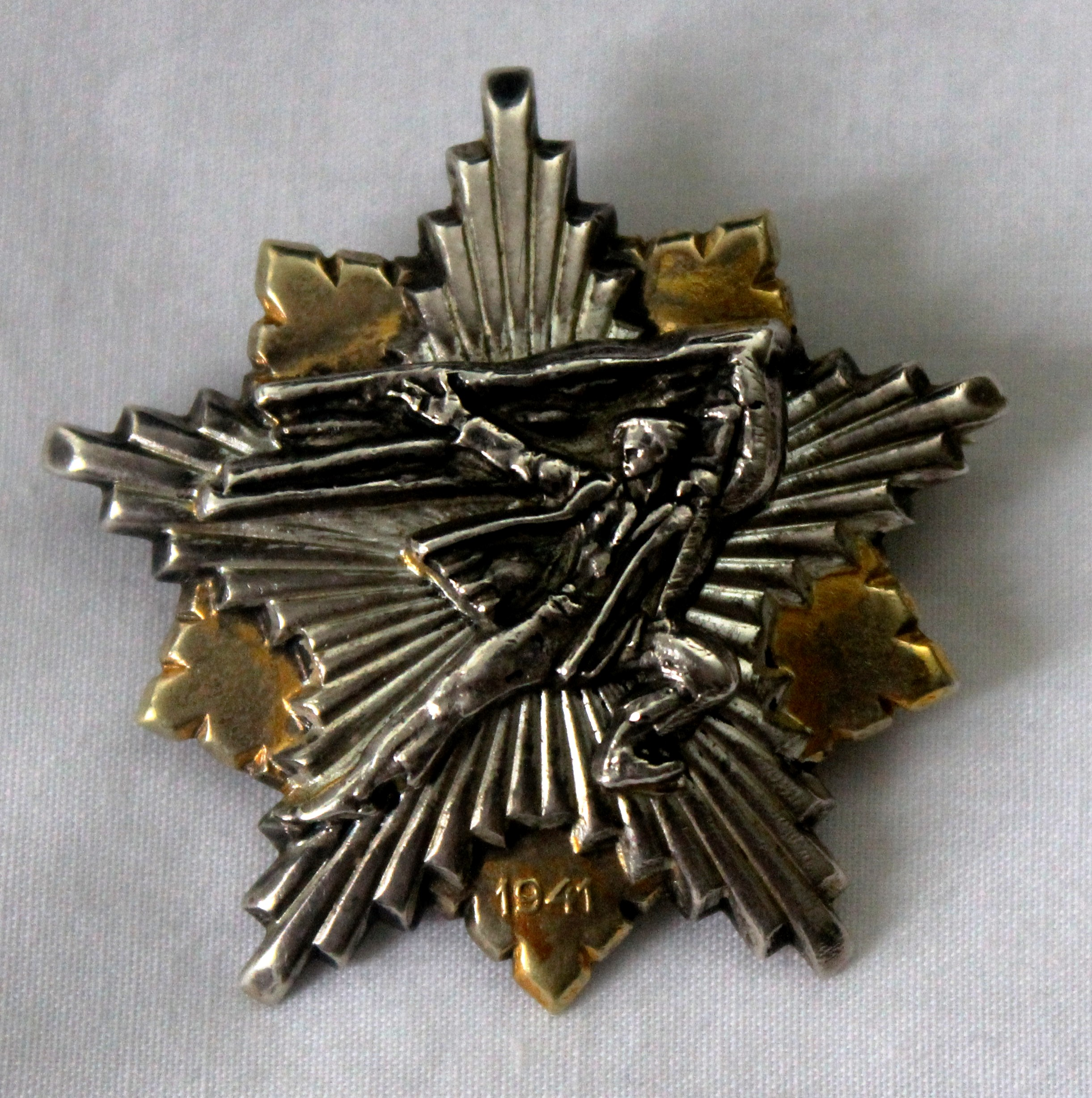
The Commemorative Medal of the Partisans of 1941

The Commemorative Medal of the Partisans of 1941 (Macedonian, Slovene and Serbo-Croatian: Partizanska spomenica 1941. / Партизанска споменица 1941.) is a commemorative Yugoslav medal instituted on 14 September 1944, awarded to those actively involved in leading the Partisan National Liberation Army or political units between 1941 and the end of World War II. Between 1941 and 1945, the numbers of recorded active soldiers of the Partisan National Liberation Army fighting rose from 81,000 to over 800,000 across Yugoslavia. These figures do not include other members of the partisan resistance who were simultaneously active at the time in other capacities including political personnel, civilian duties, undercover operatives, amongst whom some of these medals were also justly distributed. In total 27,629 of these medals were awarded by the end of its awarding period in 1963. It was given only to surviving soldiers, whereas families of those killed in action were awarded the Commemorative Medal of Martyrs of 1941.

== History ==
The first set of medals awarded between 1944 and 1946 were produced in the Soviet Union and made of bronze and red enamel. After the Partisan Monuments Act of 1941, these were replaced by a new design for the medal designed by Antun Augustinčić and Đorđe Andrejević Kun. This later model is made out of silver with gold-plated parts, and is worn on the left side of the blouse or coat pocket.

According to the "Law on Fundamental Rights of holders of the Commemorative Partisan Medal 1941" dated 21 December 1972, holders were entitled to health care and other rights to health insurance, pension supplement, fixed monthly allowance, annual allowance recovery, free and privileged access to public transportation means and holidays. The medals were presented with a special personalised booklet as a type of passport for these privileges.

Applications for the medal initially closed in 1951 but because of high demand a new window for applications was opened in 1957. The main distribution of medals ceased in 1963, by which 27,629 had been awarded, including 1,812 within the Socialist Republic of Slovenia.

After the breakup of Yugoslavia, recipients of the medal were still able to receive some of the benefits of their award in the former Yugoslav countries.

Although originally ranked alongside the other recorded Yugoslav medals, this was later changed. Since then it has historically been considered to be of its own category separate to other traditional Yugoslav decorations.

Documents were given out by the Ministry of Defence between 1945 and 1950.From 1950 to 1980 the State Secretary, by Army General. From 31 December 1980 to 1990, the Presidential Committee (Presidency) gave out the awards.From 31 December 1990 the State Secretary of Labour, Healthcare, Military and Socio-Politics gave out until the end of SFRY, the last ever give out during SFRY was on 31 December 1990(Number 24,000-27,000).Later on the last ever give out was on 1 January 2001, with 1,000 last give outs by the State Minister (Prim. Dr. Milodrag Kovač), number 27,000-27,629.

It was last awarded on 1 January 2001, to Mladenovič Krste Aranbel.
