= League of Communists of Bosnia and Herzegovina =

League of Communists of Bosnia and Herzegovina Savez komunista Bosne i Hercegovine, Савез комуниста Босне и Херцеговине
- Leader: President of the League of Communists of Bosnia and Herzegovina
- Founded: 1–5 November 1948
- Dissolved: 24 February 1991
- Succeeded by: SDP BiH
- Headquarters: Sarajevo, SR Bosnia and Herzegovina, SFR Yugoslavia
- Ideology: Communism; Marxism–Leninism; Titoism
- Political position: Left-wing to far-left
- National affiliation: League of Communists of Yugoslavia
- Colours: Red
- Slogan: Proleteri svih zemalja, ujedinite se! (Proletarians of all countries, unite!)

Party flag
- Politics of Bosnia and Herzegovina; Political parties; Elections; Bosnian and Herzegovinian branch of the League of Communists of Yugoslavia

The League of Communists of Bosnia and Herzegovina (Serbo-Croatian: Savez komunista Bosne i Hercegovine, SK BiH, Савез комуниста Босне и Херцеговине, СК БиХ) was the Bosnian branch of the League of Communists of Yugoslavia.

== Party leaders ==
1. Đuro Pucar (5 November 1948 – 5 March 1965) (1899–1979)
2. Cvijetin Mijatović (5 March 1965 – 9 April 1969) (1913–1993)
3. Branko Mikulić (9 April 1969 – 11 May 1978) (1928–1994)
4. Nikola Stojanović (11 May 1978 – 20 May 1982) (1933–2020)
5. Hamdija Pozderac (20 May 1982 – 28 May 1984) (1923–1988)
6. Mato Andrić (28 May 1984 – 21 May 1986) (1928–2015)
7. Milan Uzelac (21 May 1986 – May 1988) (1932–2005)
8. Abdulah Mutapčić (May 1988 – 29 June 1989) (1932–2013)
9. Nijaz Duraković (29 June 1989 – 24 February 1991) (1949–2012)

== See also ==
- History of Bosnia and Herzegovina
- League of Communists of Yugoslavia
  - League of Communists of Croatia
  - League of Communists of Macedonia
  - League of Communists of Montenegro
  - League of Communists of Serbia
    - League of Communists of Vojvodina
    - League of Communists of Kosovo
  - League of Communists of Slovenia
- List of leaders of communist Yugoslavia
- Socialist Federal Republic of Yugoslavia
