= Cvijetin Mijatović =

Former President of the Presidency of Yugoslavia

- Цвијетин Мијатовић
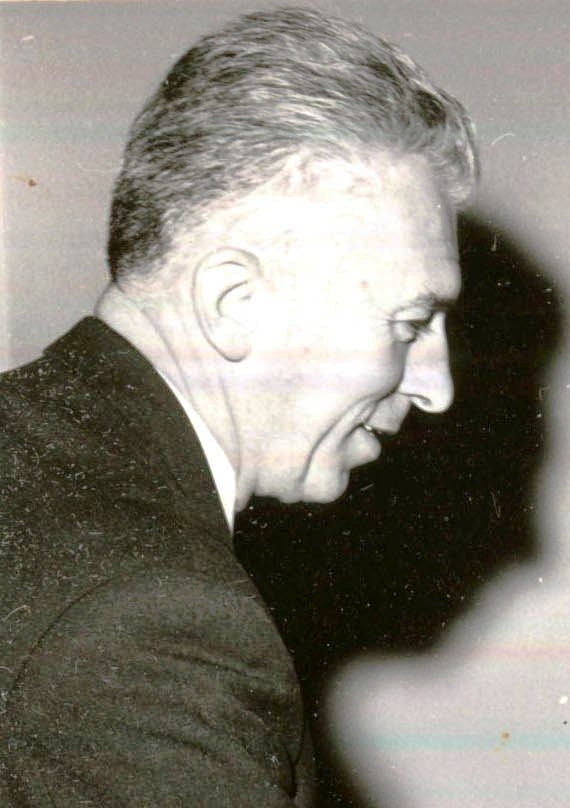
- Mijatović in 1967

2nd President of the Presidency of Yugoslavia
- In office 15 May 1980 – 15 May 1981
- Prime Minister: Veselin Đuranović
- Preceded by: Lazar Koliševski
- Succeeded by: Sergej Kraigher

2nd President of the League of Communists of Bosnia and Herzegovina
- In office 5 March 1965 – 9 April 1969
- Preceded by: Đuro Pucar
- Succeeded by: Branko Mikulić

Personal details
- Born: 8 January 1913 Lopare, Bosnia and Herzegovina, Austria-Hungary
- Died: 15 November 1993 (aged 80) Belgrade, FR Yugoslavia
- Party: SKJ

Cvijetin "Majo" Mijatović (Serbian Cyrillic: Цвијетин “Мајо” Мијатовић; 8 January 1913 – 15 November 1993) was a Yugoslav communist politician who served as President of the Presidency of Yugoslavia from 1980 to 1981. He also served as President of the League of Communists of Bosnia and Herzegovina from 1965 to 1969.

== Early life and career ==
Mijatović was born in Lopare, Austria-Hungary (now Lopare, Bosnia and Herzegovina). In 1934, he became a member of the Communist Party of Yugoslavia (KPJ). Between 1934 and 1941 (except in 1938–1939 when he fulfilled Party duties in Bosnia and Herzegovina) he was a member of the University Committee of KPJ, instructor of the Regional Committee of KPJ for Serbia, and member of the city committee of KPJ for Belgrade.

After Yugoslavia was invaded in 1941, he participated in organizing armed battles in east Bosnia. He was a member of ZAVNOBiH since founding and AVNOJ since the second council.

After the liberation, he was Organisational Secretary of Communist League of Bosnia and Herzegovina, director of the High political school in Belgrade, chief editor of the newspaper "Komunist", ambassador of Yugoslavia to the USSR, member of the Central Committee of Communist League of Yugoslavia Bosnia and Herzegovina, secretary and the president of the Central Committee of Communist League of Bosnia and Herzegovina, member of the Presidency of Communist League of Yugoslavia and Chairman of the Presidency of Yugoslavia.

== Personal life ==
Mijatović's wife, actress Sibina Bogunović, died in a traffic collision on 22 June 1970.

In 1973, he remarried, this time to actress Mira Stupica.

From his first marriage, Mijatović had two daughters: Mirjana "Mira" (1961–1991) and Maja (1966–1991). Mira was a singer and member of the new wave band VIA Talas. Maja was an actress and television presenter, best known for hosting Nedjeljno popodne on TV Sarajevo.

Political offices
Preceded by Lazar Koliševski	President of the Presidency of Yugoslavia; 1980–1981	Succeeded by Sergej Kraigher
Party political offices
Preceded by Đuro Pucar	President of the League of Communists of Bosnia and Herzegovina; 1965–1969	Succeeded by Branko Mikulić
