= Architecture of Bosnia and Herzegovina =

The architecture of Bosnia and Herzegovina is largely influenced by four major periods, when political and social changes determined the creation of distinct cultural and architectural habits of the region.

== Medieval period ==
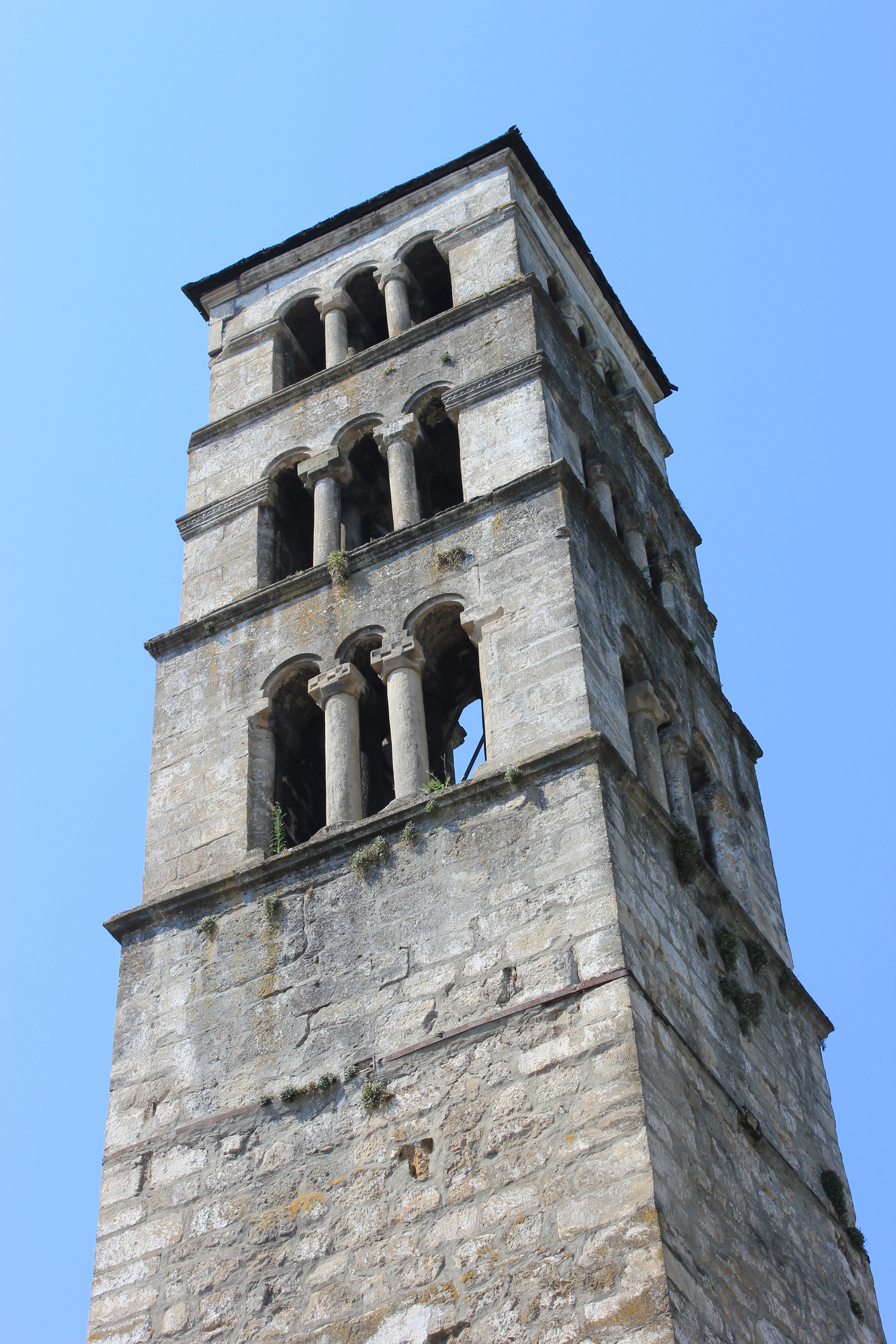
St. Luke's belltower in Jajce

The medieval period in Bosnia lasted until the invasion of Ottoman Empire. The social organization of Bosnia of that time developed into a system known as Zadruga. In Zadruga, the community was organized such that a few families with common interests would live closely together in housing clusters. The leaders of the community were selected according to their age and high ethical standards. The Zadruga system was primarily found a rural agrarian communities that is greatly dependent on natural resources. As the community grew, segments of families would collectively move to another area forming a new cluster or a village. The continuing links between these related clusters stimulated both trade and economy. Individual families lived together in houses known as Dinaric houses. These were simple structures build of natural materials (usually timber and wickerwork). Interior space was organized around the hearth in a central room with separate private quarters for men and women.

Even though military fortresses in Bosnia and Herzegovina date from the era of Roman rule, most of them were built between the 12th and 15th century. The structures were built out of rough cut stone on hills overlooking a river, route or town. Today there are around 300 of them but most of them are in ruins. The most beautiful and well preserved are: Sarajevo, Srebrenik, Blagaj, Jajce, Travnik, Tešanj, Počitelj, Doboj, Vranduk, Bobovac, Stolac, Maglaj, Gradačac, Ljubuški, Sokol, Ključ, Bihać, Bosanska Krupa, Oštrovica, Velika Kladuša, Višegrad, and Zvornik. The court in Kraljeva Sutjeska was even richly engraved in Gothic style. An example of medieval Gothic and Romanesque tower is the Tower of St. Luke located in Jajce, created in the 15th century.

Medieval architecture
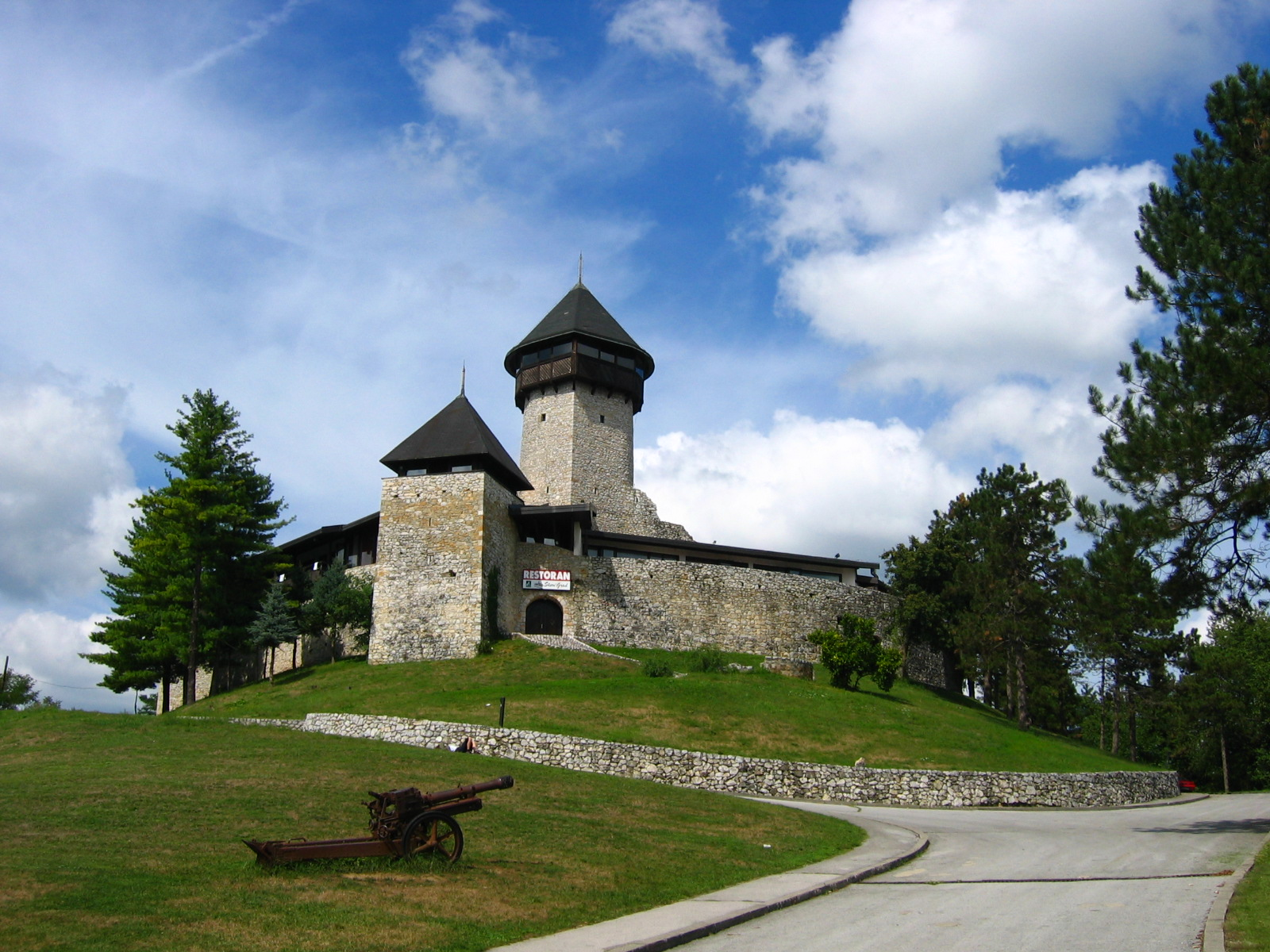
Castle in Velika Kladuša

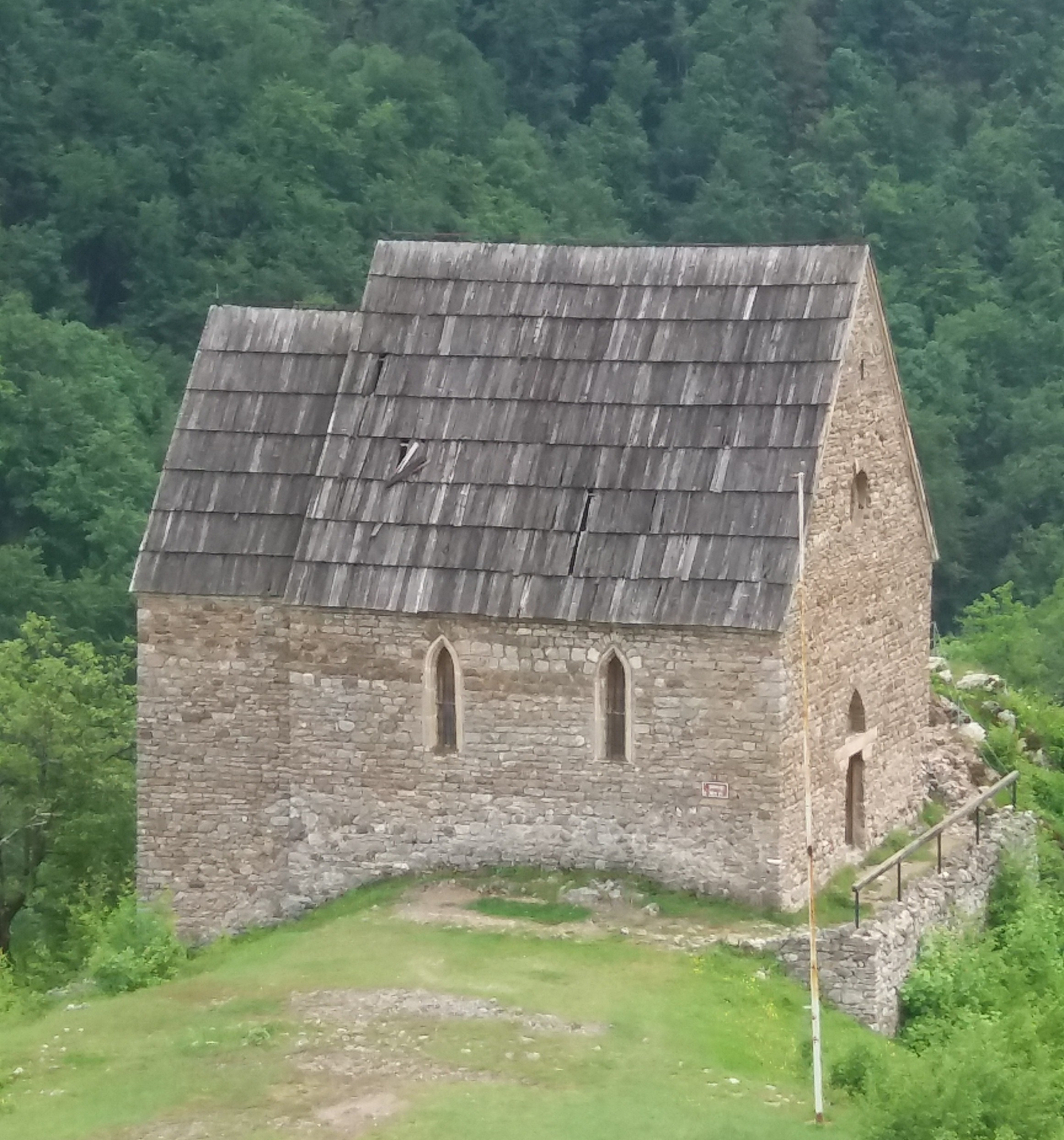
Bobovac, seat of the rulers of Bosnia.

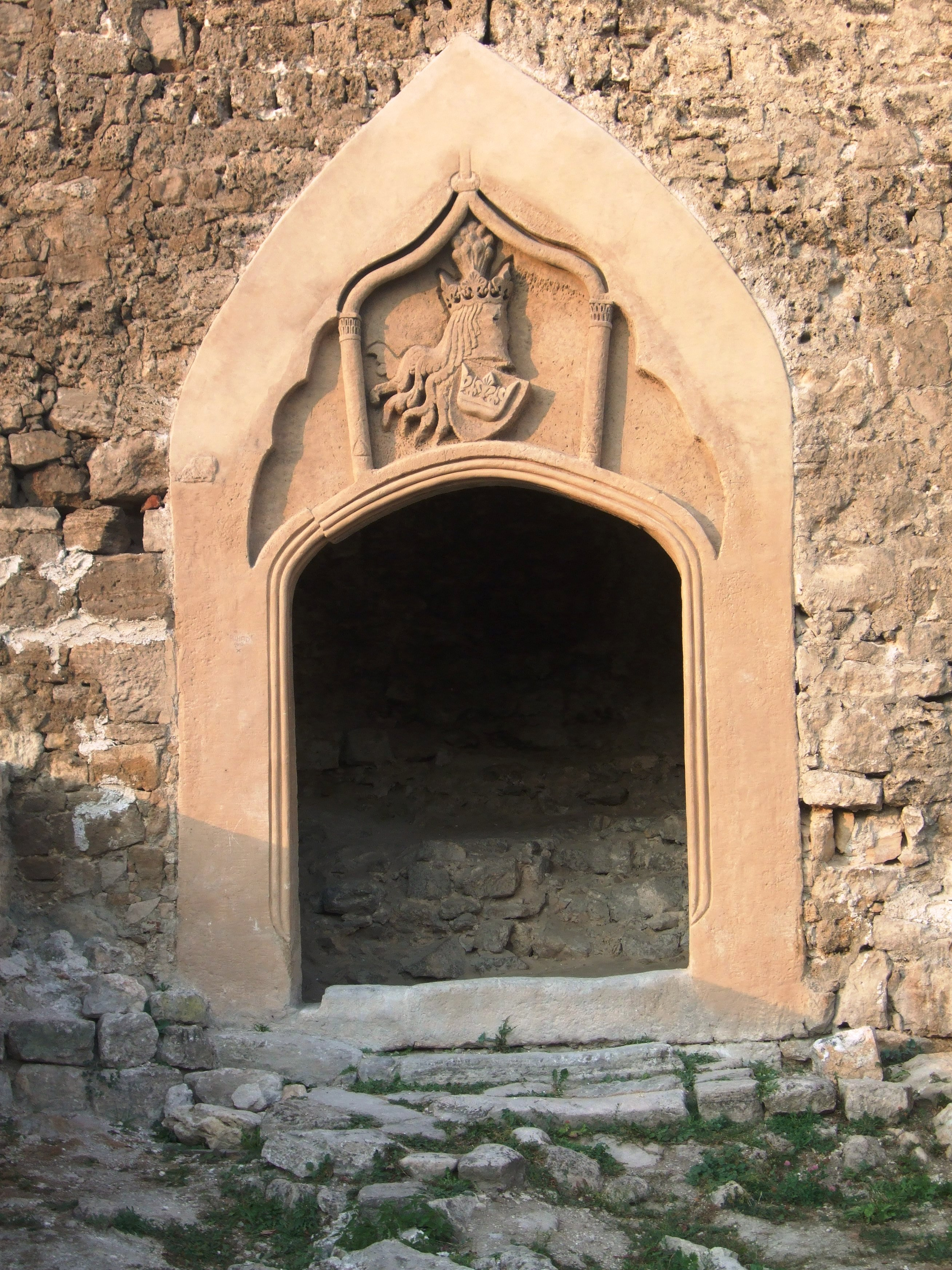
Gate of the Fortress of Jajce

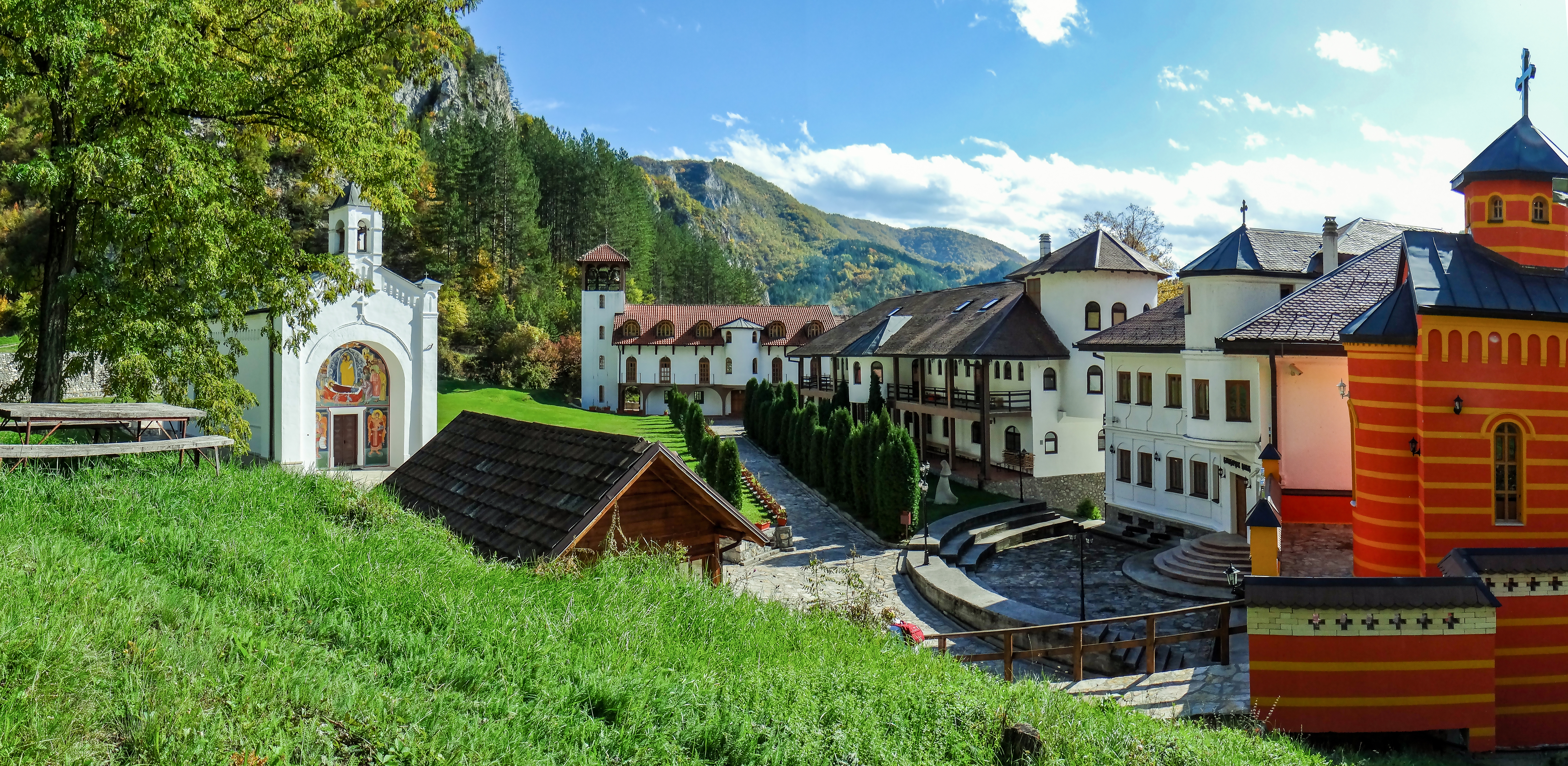
Serbian orthodox monastery Dobrun

== Ottoman period ==
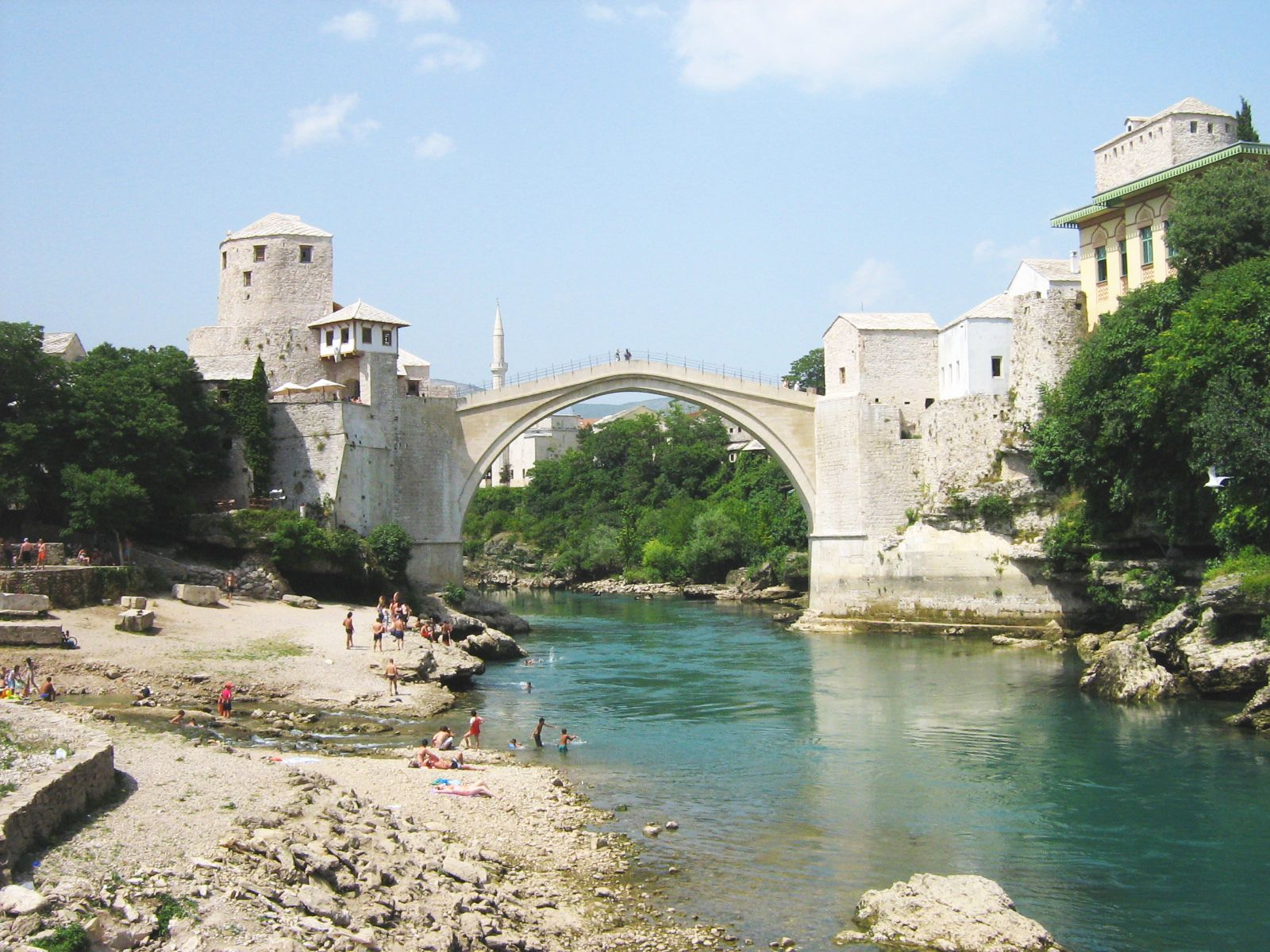
Stari Most in Mostar

In the late 15th century, the Ottoman Empire came to the Balkans. They addressed the need to develop urban areas and cities, bringing imperial Islamic architecture to the region, partly mixed with local customs (one of them being the use of squinches instead of triangular pendentives found in Turkey). From this emerged the basic form and organization of urban areas which are still distinctive today. Dušan Grabrijan, an architectural theoretician, defined the primary organization of typical Bosnian cities. He recognized that cities had five authentic components defined by a set of "unwritten laws": surrounding hills defined the form of the city, the main road is the spine, "Čarsija" is the heart, vegetation are lungs, river is the spirit. Juraj Neidhardt, another theoretician, described a typical Bosnian city in one of his books as follows:

What is the charm of the Orient that starts in Sarajevo and that Westerners can't resist? Here there are no planned actions that would come from rational thinking, it is all a matter of improvisation, the result of ad hoc ideas and temporary needs. Here you cannot find a clear axis and absolute symmetry. Here you can't even find construction systems being built properly. Here everything displays the need to please humans. Composition, in the West, thought and built according to logic and plan, here becomes an agglomeration of parts, every time a result of different needs and every time improvised differently; but always in relation to the senses.

The fact that people used river as a main element of urban life led to construction of Stari Most in 1566 in Mostar in Herzegovina. At the time it was built it was the longest single span arch stone bridge in the world. Its meaning had however rather more profound power. It symbolized the connection between eastern and western civilization. In addition to urban planning, architecture of Bosnia has emerged with a bit clearer architectural vocabulary. Architecture however was organized around a set of unwritten architectural laws including: human scale, unobstructed views, geometry, open and flexible spaces, simple furniture, spatial links to nature and use of local materials and traditional building techniques. In addition design philosophy favored heterogeneity of materials. In other words, each material had a particular intrinsic function given to it by social perception of the people involved in the architectural process. Juraj Neidhardt described this perception as follows:

The point is that Bosnian man has his style. He makes his pottery, space, city, according to himself, in human scale, he is not a mystic, but a realist and that is the source of all this realistic architecture, which is at the same time comfortable, humble and democratic. All roofs and doors of these houses are almost the same, we could call them homes for anyone, all of them [houses] in the human scale, all almost grown out of the land, all the decoration brought from their construction and structure - architecture built of the natural and the local.

Hence foundations were built out of stone, ground floor out of clay, unburnt brick and wooden ties, first floor out of wooden frame and roof almost always out of wood. Organizationally, a typical Bosnian residence from the 17th century consisted of five main elements: a fence that faced and defined the street and clearly differentiated private from public, a courtyard usually built of pebble or flat stone pattern for easier maintenance, an outdoor fountain (Šadrvan) for hygienic purposes, a lower level "semi-public" private space called the Hajat where the family would gather, and the Divanhan, an upper-level semi-private/private space used for relaxation and enjoyment.

Ottoman architecture
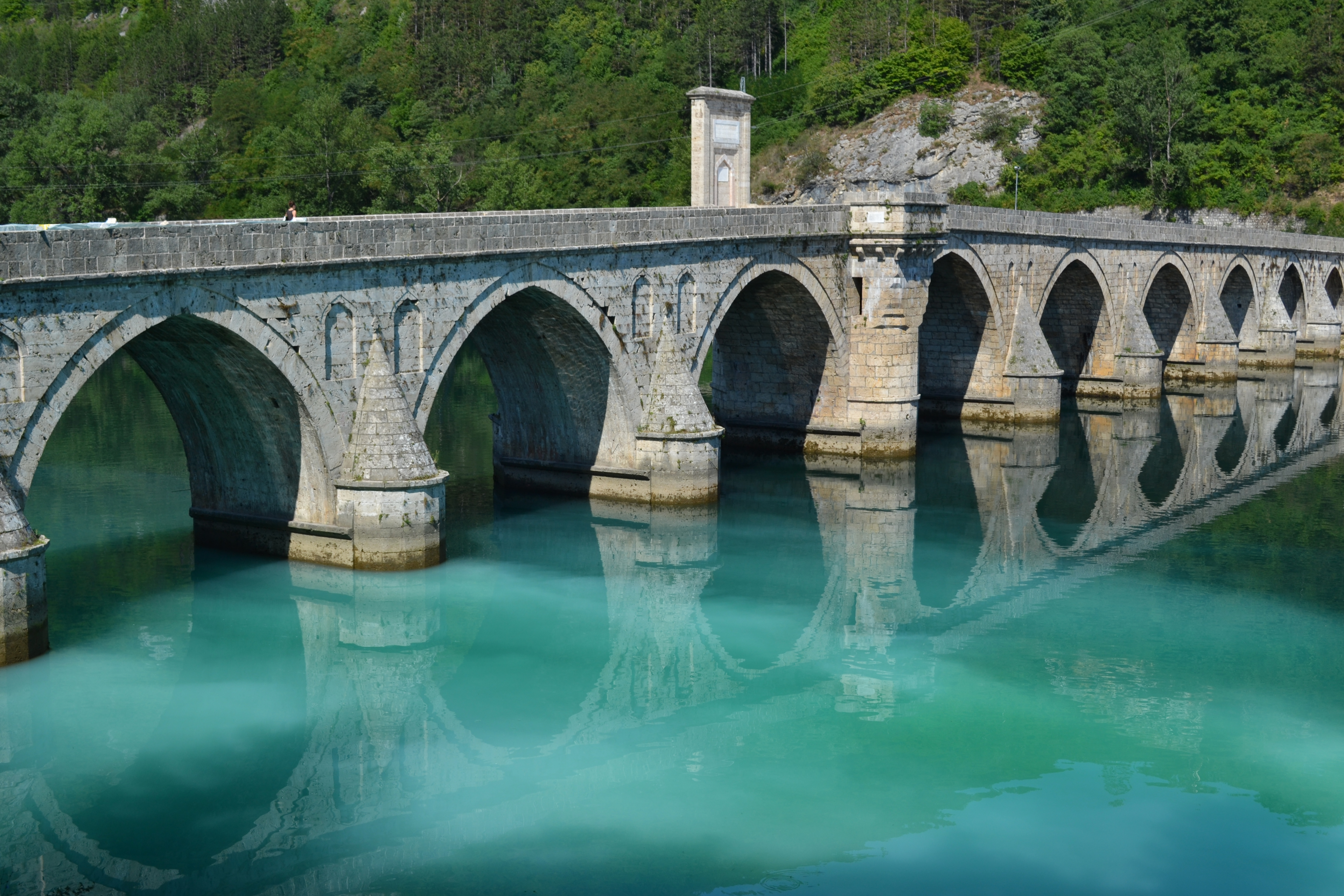
Mehmed Paša Sokolović Bridge on the Drina river in Višegrad

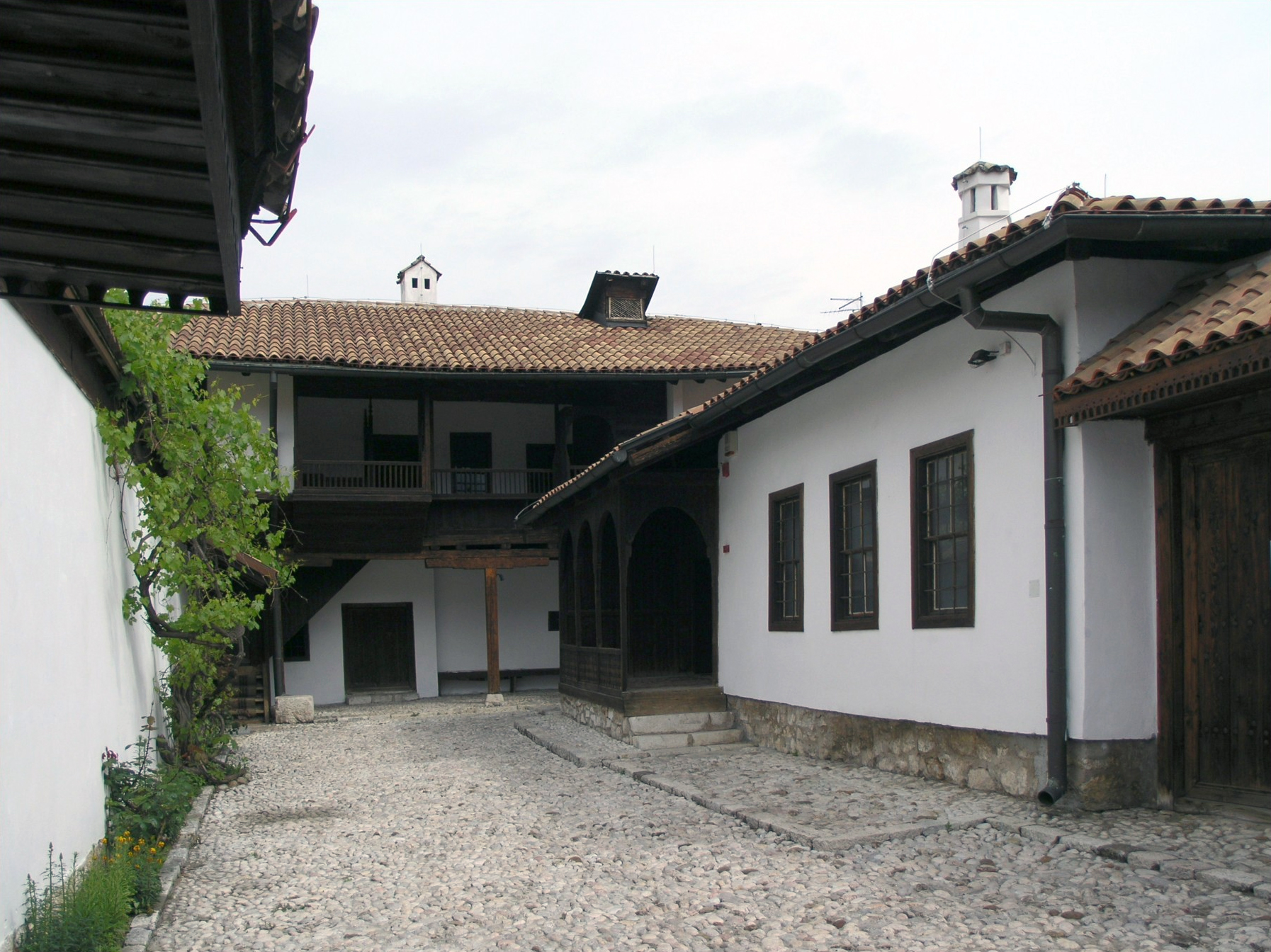
Svrzo's House in Sarajevo

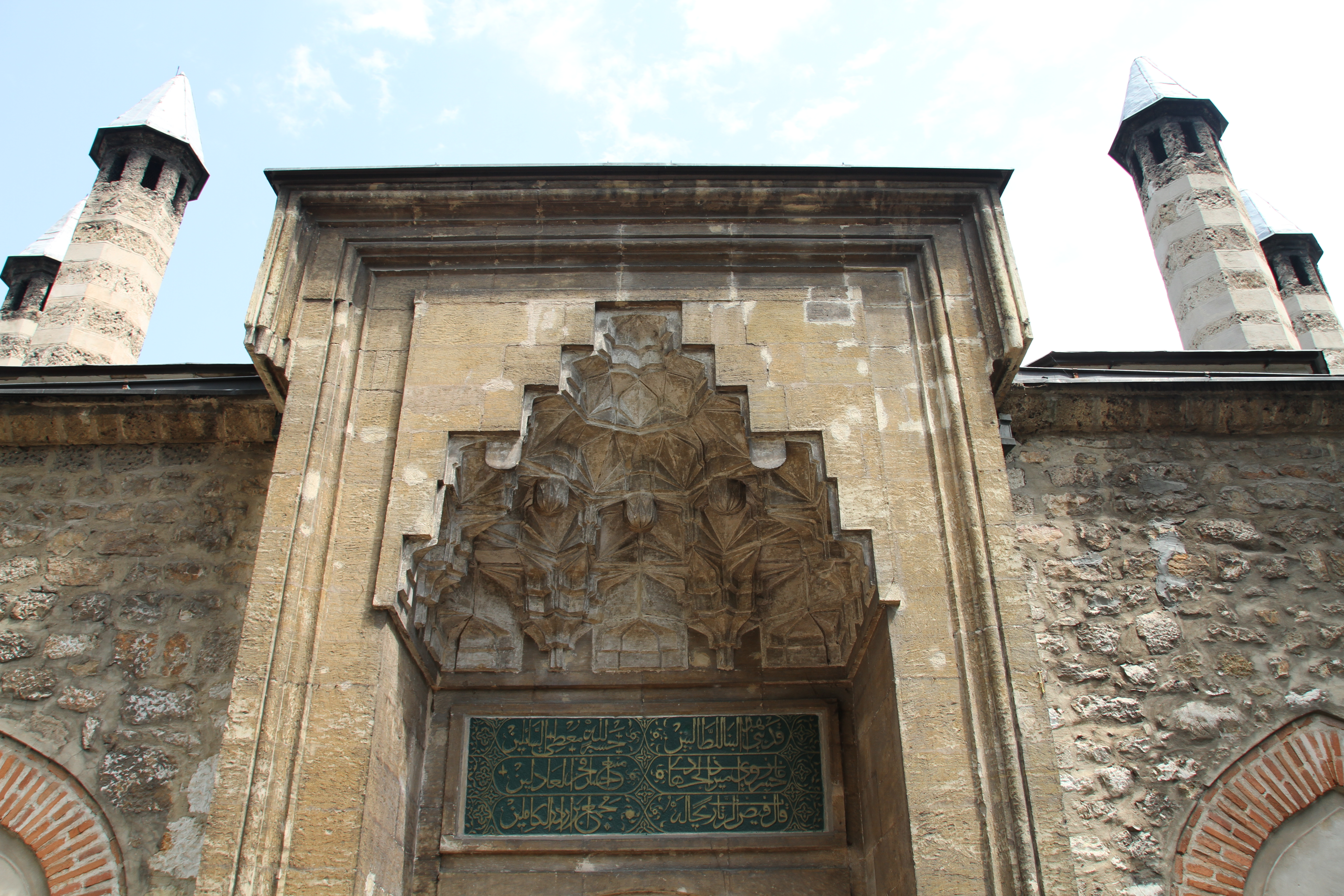
Gazi Husrev-Begova madrasa in Sarajevo

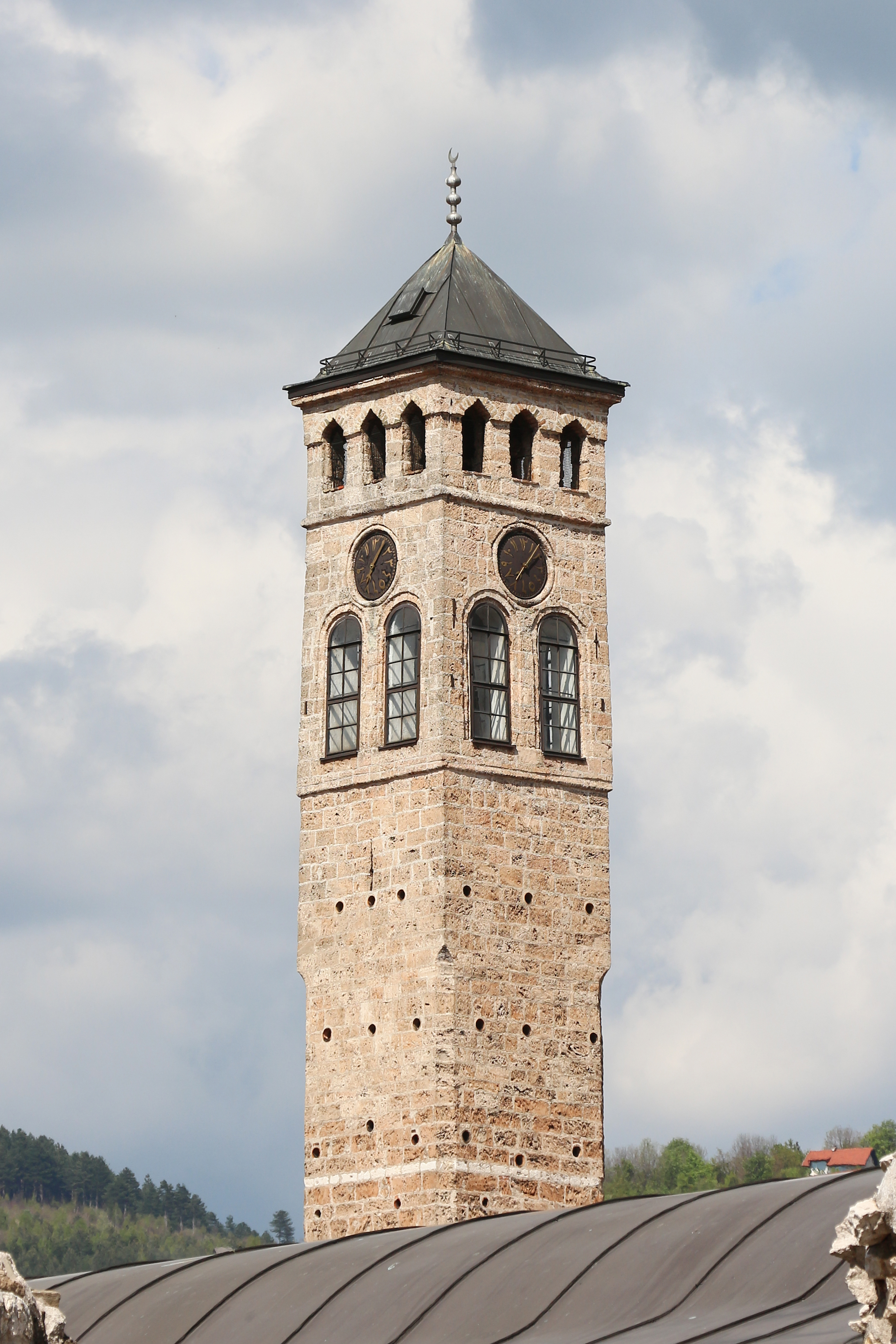
Sahat-kula (clock tower), Sarajevo

== Austro-Hungarian period ==
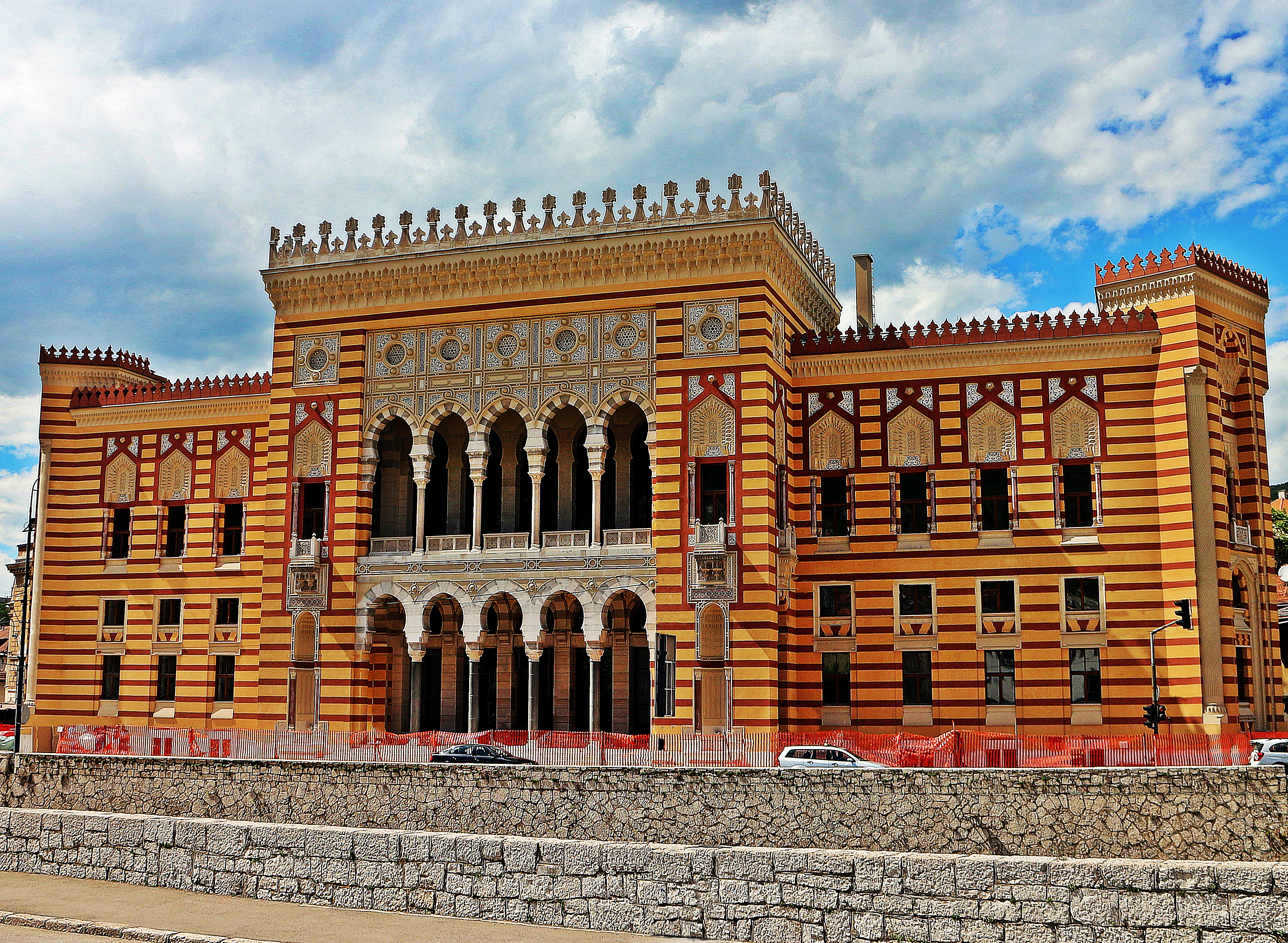
The Vijećnica, built in Moorish Revival style by Karel Pařík, Alexander Wittek and Ćiril Iveković (1891–1896)

In 1878 Bosnia and Herzegovina fell under Austro-Hungarian rule which in 40 years had an immense influence in future urban planning and architecture. Some of the changes introduced by Austrian influence included introduction of new building code regulations such as required building permits, life safety and fire protection requirements, regulated wall thickness and building heights. Some changes in urban planning involved classification of street types and consequent building regulations, requirement for harmonious design with immediate surroundings and compliance with overall regulation plan. There were also changes in a general design philosophy. Stylistically, Bosnia was to be assimilated into the European mainstream (hence the use of historicist architectural styles), save for the appearance of the Orientalist style (also Pseudo-Moorish style). The aim was to promote Bosnian national identity while avoiding its association with either the Ottoman Empire or the growing pan-Slavic movement by creating an "Islamic architecture of European fantasy".

The new architectural languages added to diversity of already complex urban composition in Bosnian cities. These and other changes caused certain other consequences in Bosnia. For example, building life safety was improved however local building contractors and architects become obsolete due to new regulations and construction methods. This caused immigration of skilled labor from Central Europe that further doubled and diversified the population of Bosnia and Herzegovina which in the turn stimulated the economy.

Finally, cities began changing their character. The majority of projects during the time of Austrian influence dealt with administrative building designs. The post office in Sarajevo for example follows distinct formal characteristics of design like clarity of form, symmetry, and proportion while the interior followed the same doctrine. The National and University Library of Bosnia and Herzegovina in Sarajevo is an example of Orientalist architectural language using Moorish-Mamluk decoration and pointed arches while still integrating other formal elements into the design.

=== Historicist styles ===
During its reign, the Austro-Hungarian authorities sought to impose and build architecture of European styles in Bosnia and Herzegovina and thus to show the meaning of their mission in the occupied country. Initially, it offered historic styles that built the most representative buildings of the second half of the 19th century in Vienna. In Bosnia, too much was built in foreign building styles, primarily historicism, and too little appreciated, respected, and used the vernacular Bosnian methods of building.

Neolassical architecture
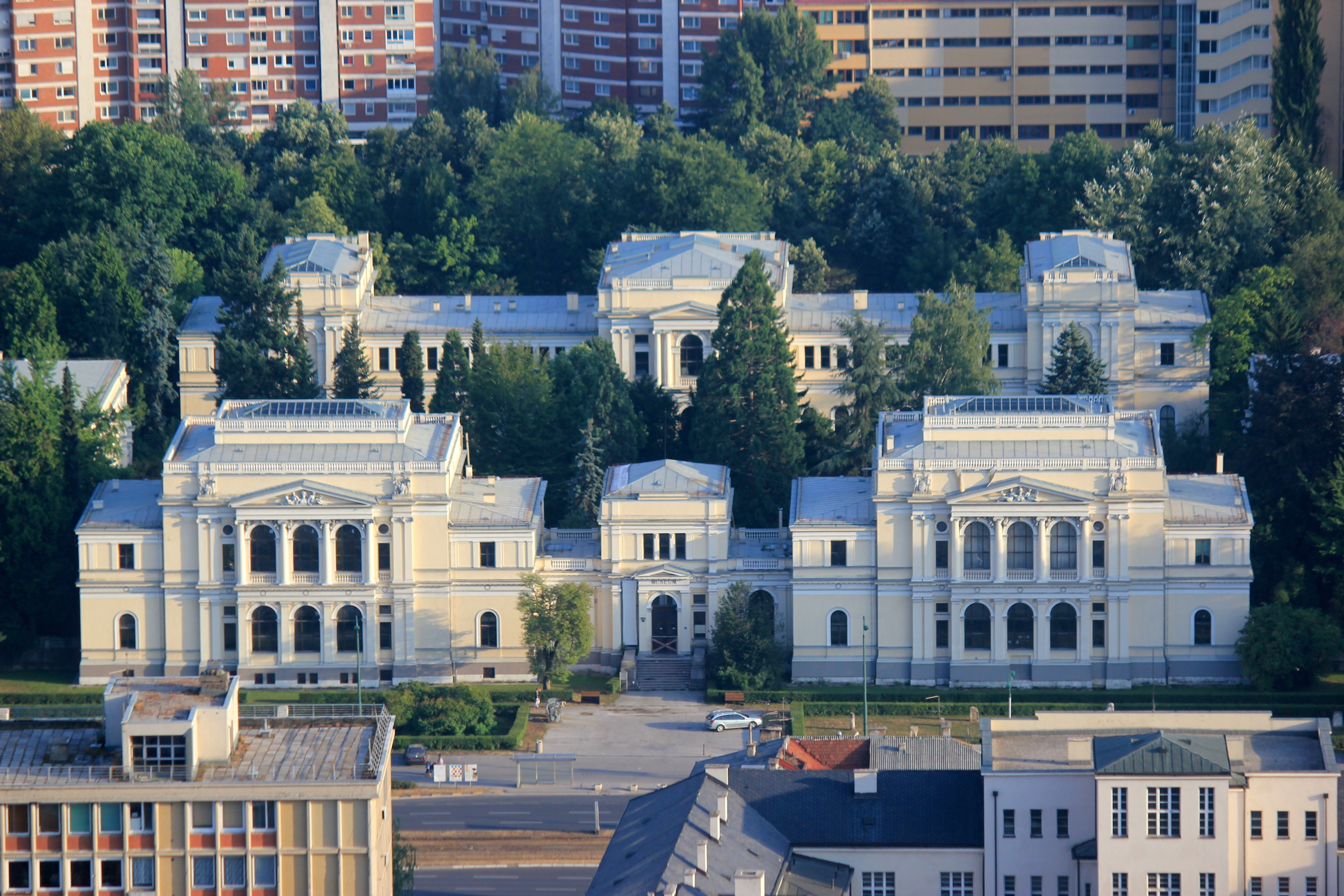
National Museum by Karel Pařík (1888)

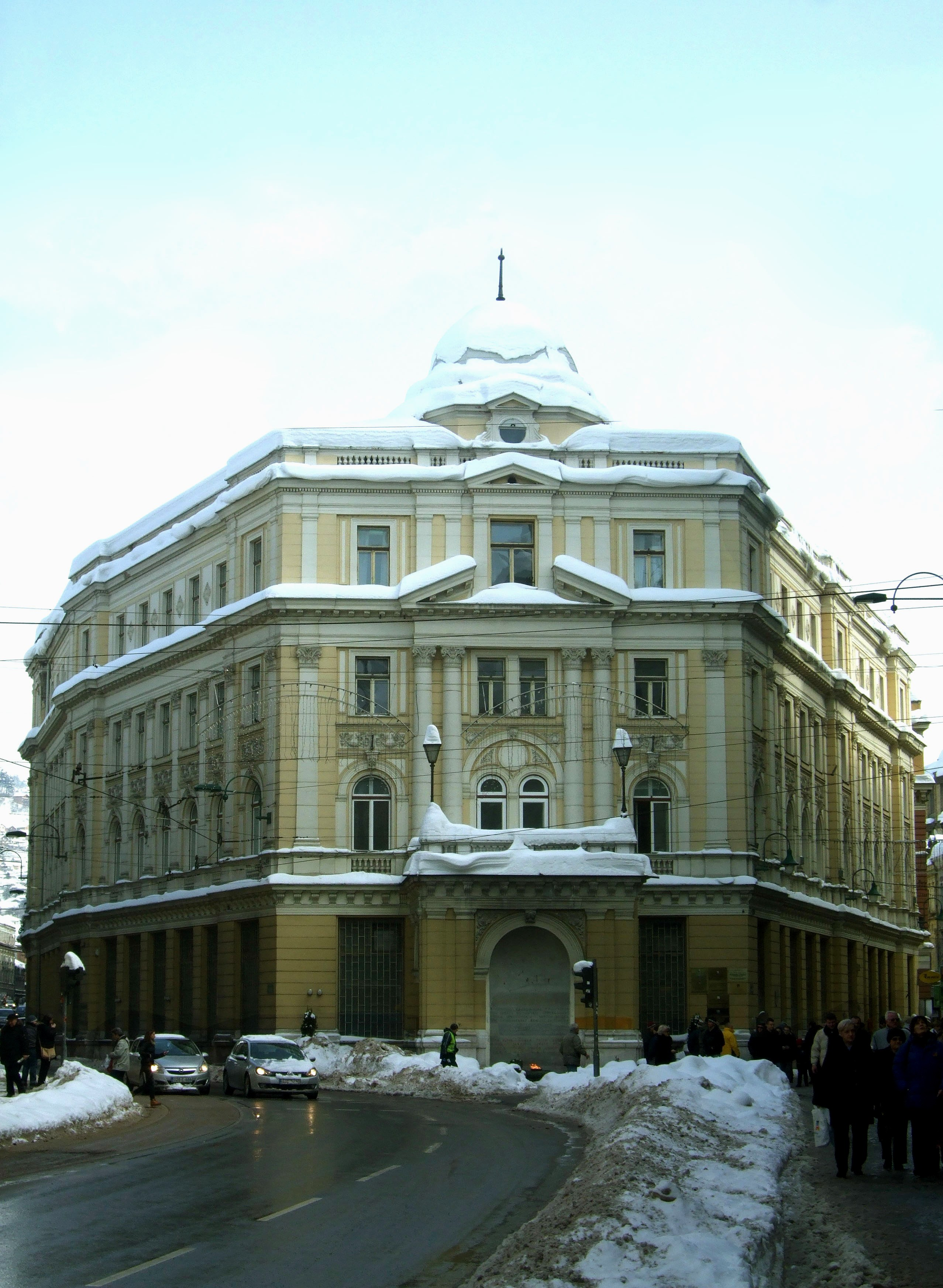
Landesbank building by Karel Pařík (1893)

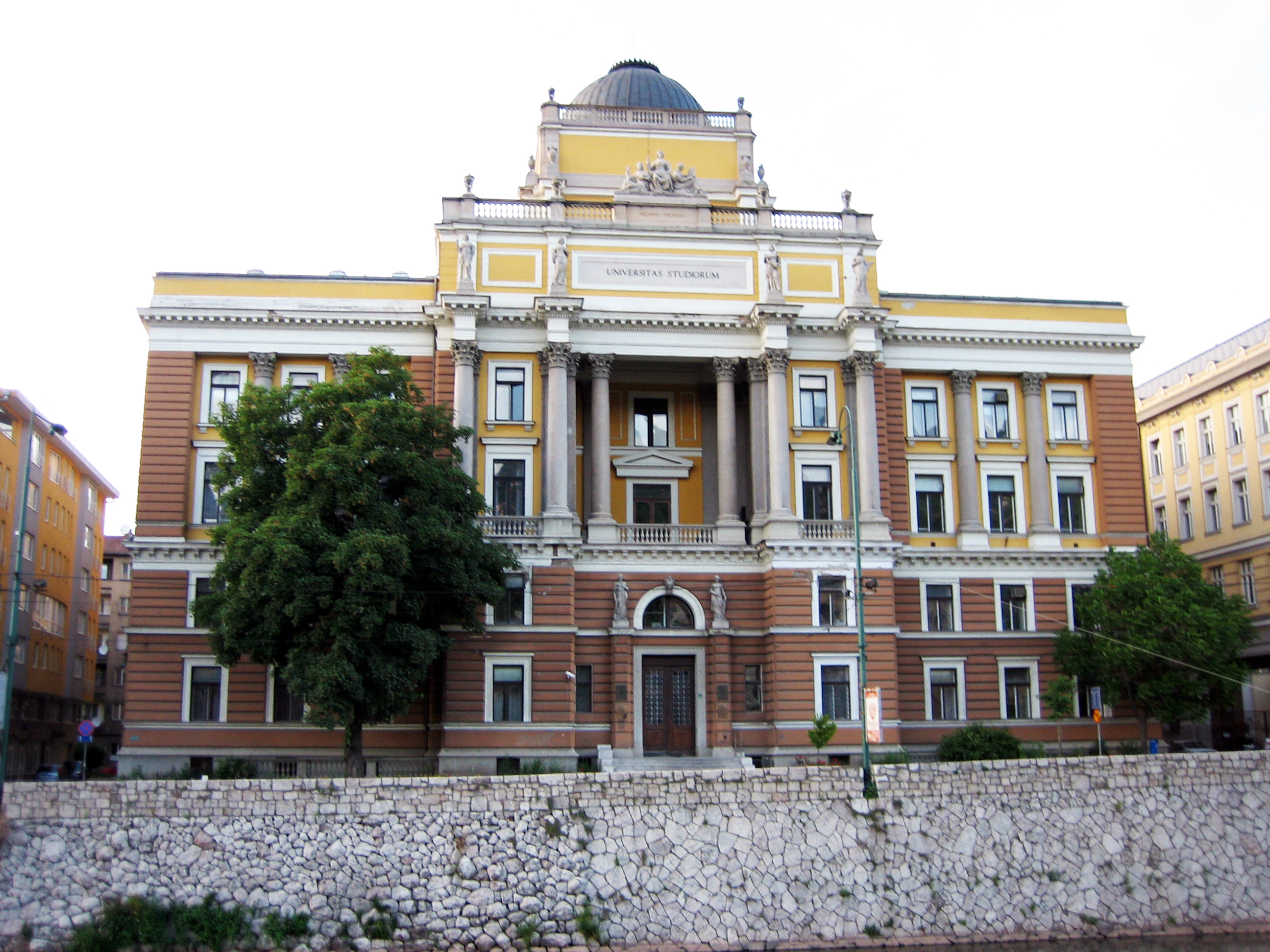
Palace of Justice by Karel Pařík

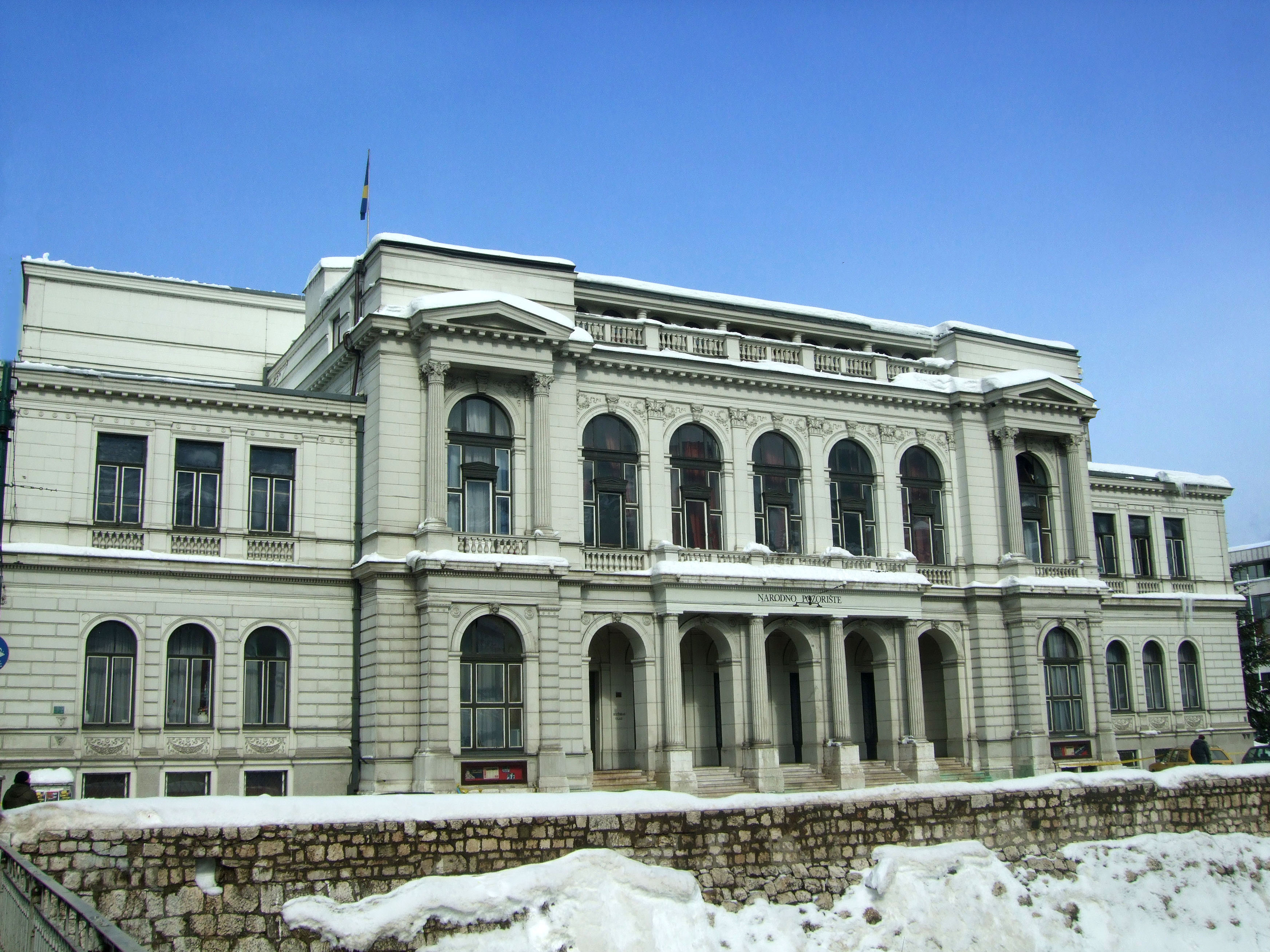
Sarajevo National Theatre by Karel Pařík (1921)
Romanesque Revival, Neo-Byzantine, and Gothic Revival architecture
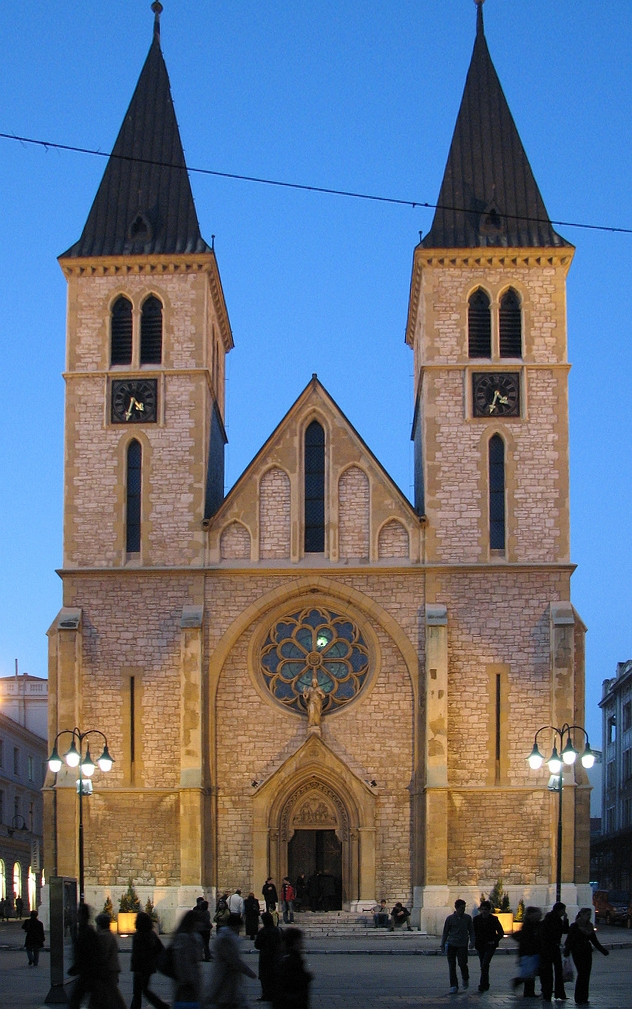
Sacred Heart Cathedral in Sarajevo by Josip Vancaš (1884–1889)

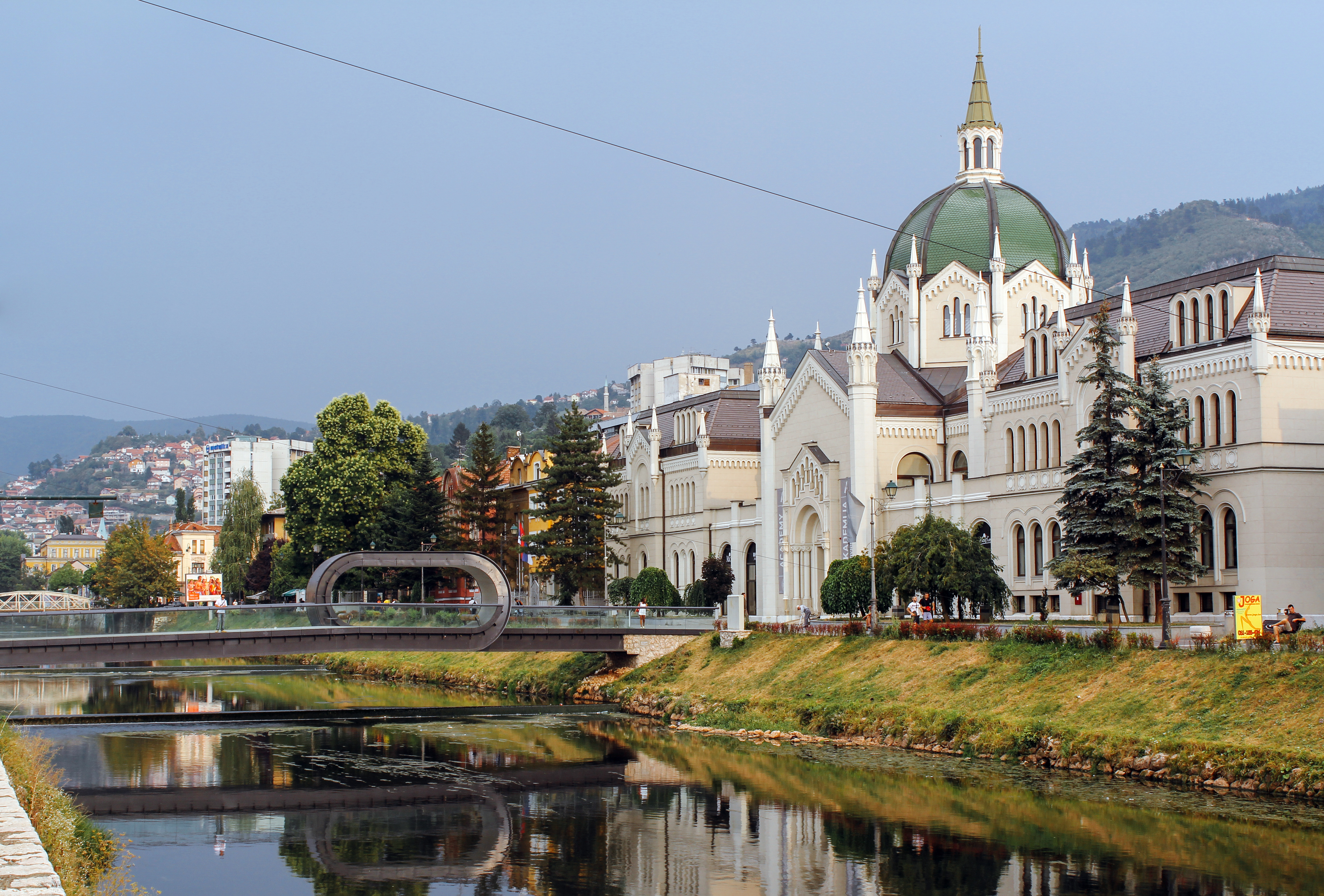
Academy of Fine Arts, originally Evangelical Church by Karel Pařík (1899)

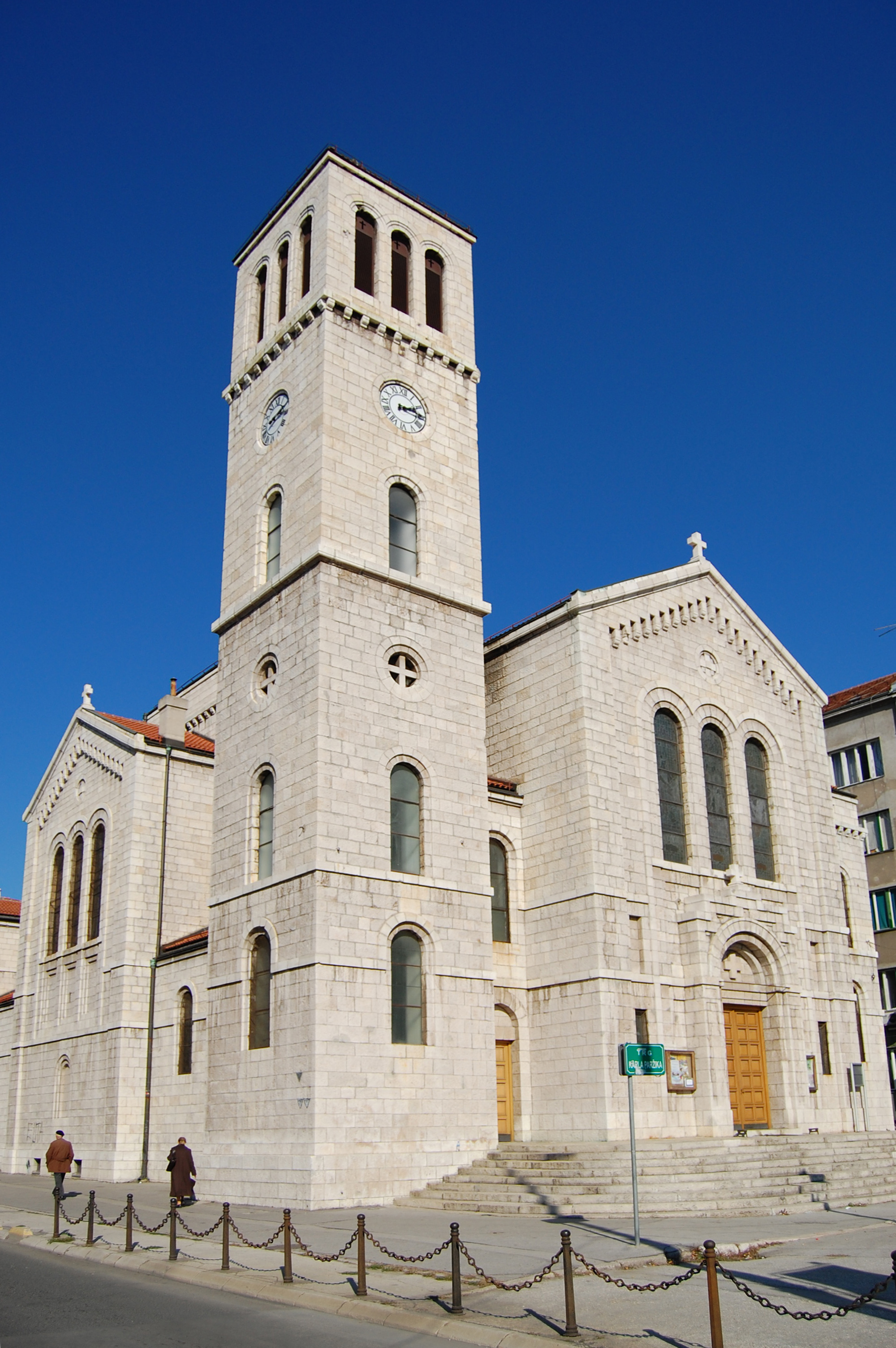
Saint Joseph's Church, Marijin Dvor, Sarajevo by Karel Pařík (1936–1940)

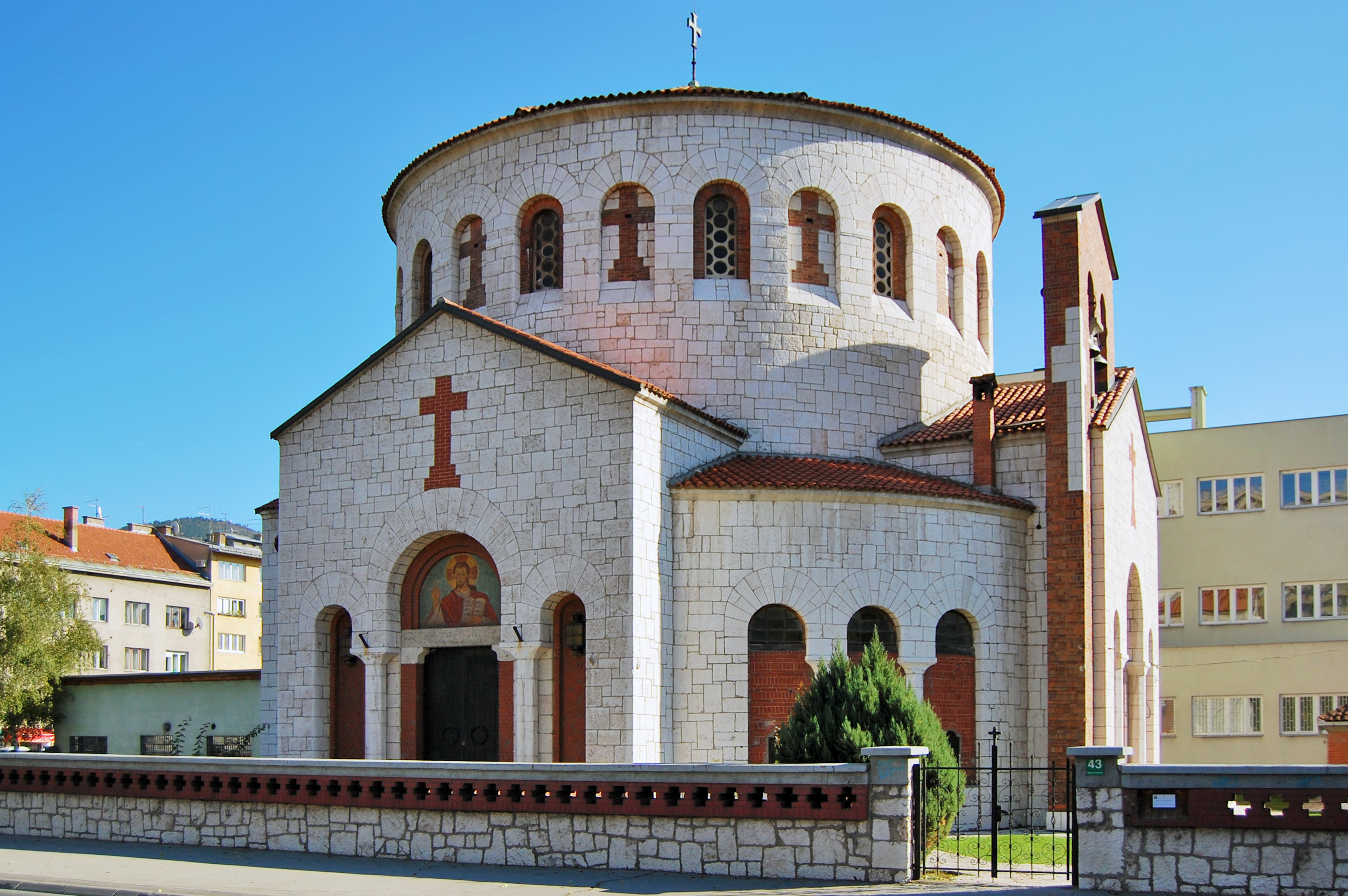
Church of the Holy Transfiguration in Sarajevo by Aleksandar Deroko, 1940

=== Moorish Revival architecture ===
Confronted with the multinational population structure in Bosnia and Herzegovina, the government realized that it was necessary to have a political ear when choosing one of the historical styles. For construction in areas where the Bosniak population was predominant, architects used the Moorish Revival style.

This style drew its inspiration from the Moorish and Mudéjar architecture of Spain as well as Mamluk architecture of Egypt and Syria, as exemplified by Mostar Gymnasium. This included application of ornamentations and other "Moorish" design strategies neither of which had much to do with prior architectural direction of indigenous Bosnian architecture.

Moorish Revival architecture
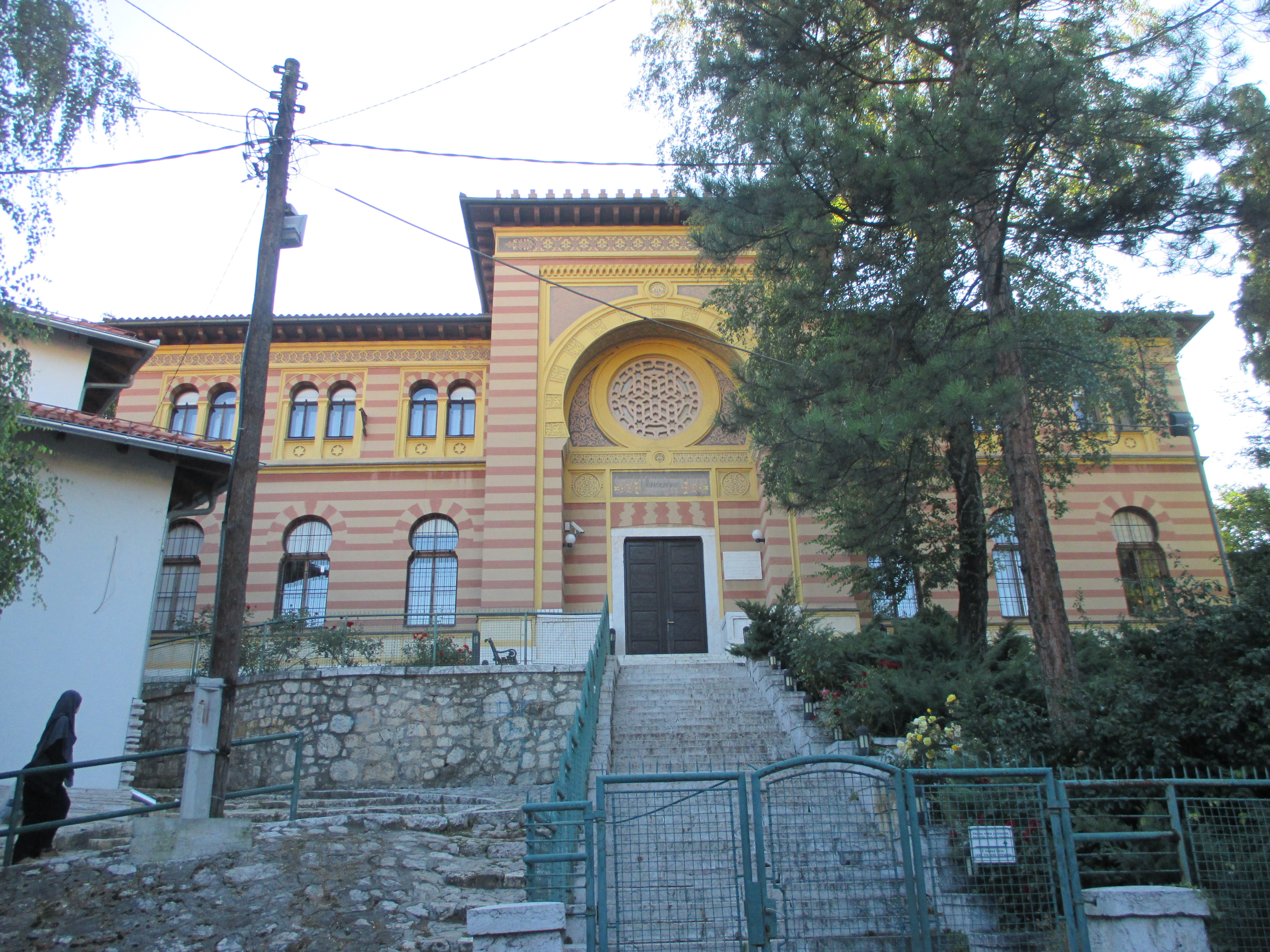
Faculty of Islamic Studies by Karel Pařík (1887)

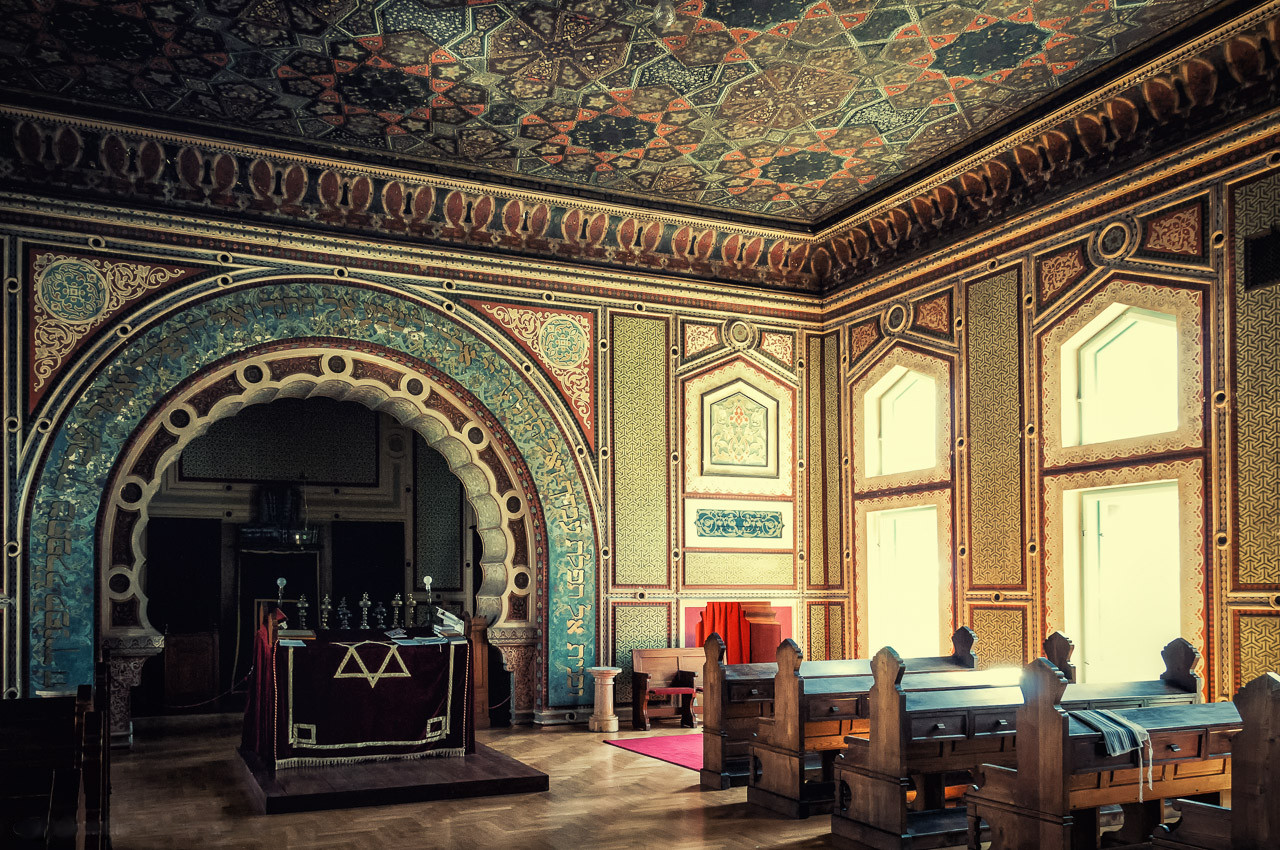
Interior of the Ashkenazi Synagogue by Karel Pařík (1902)

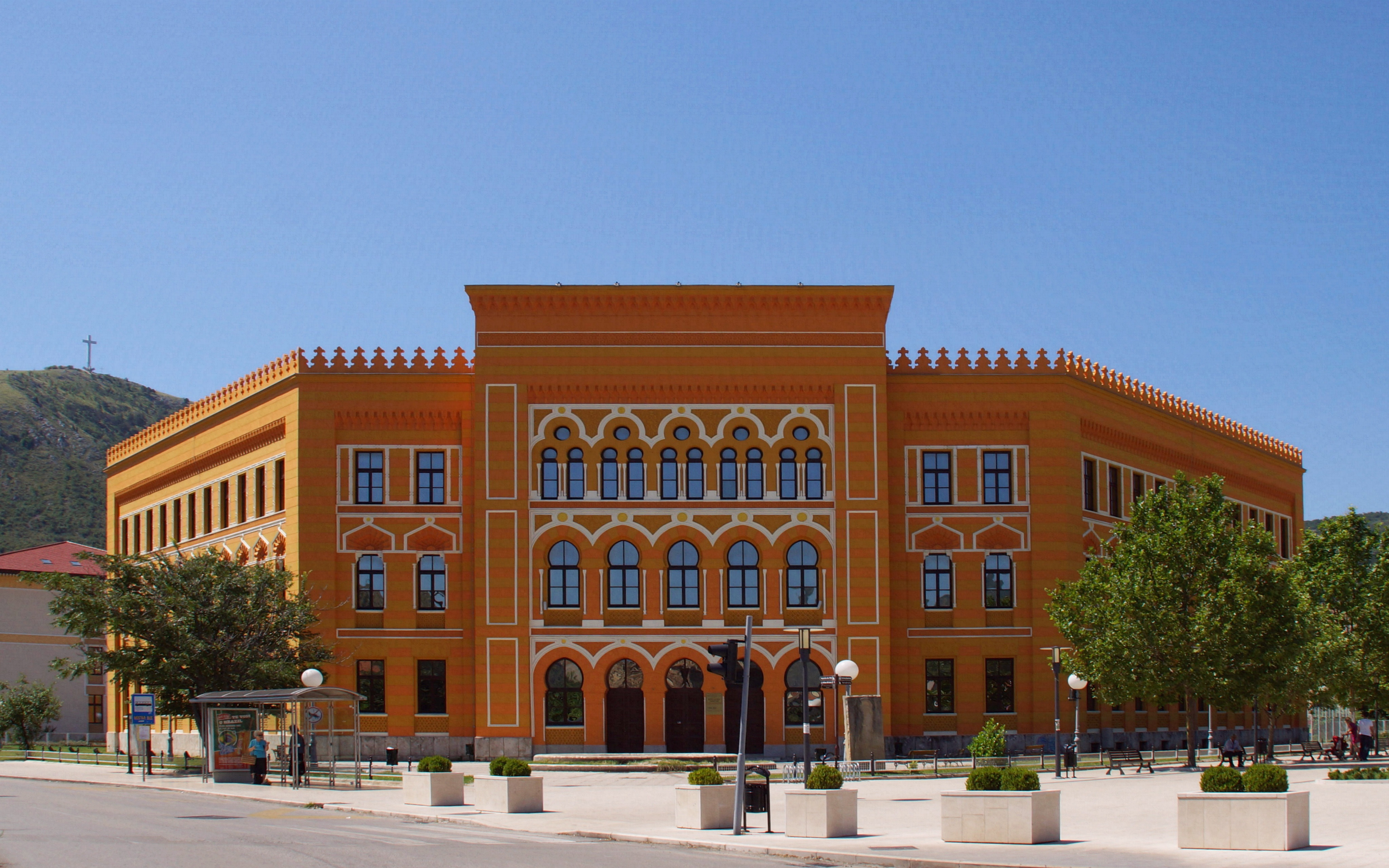
Mostar Gymnasium and United World Colleges

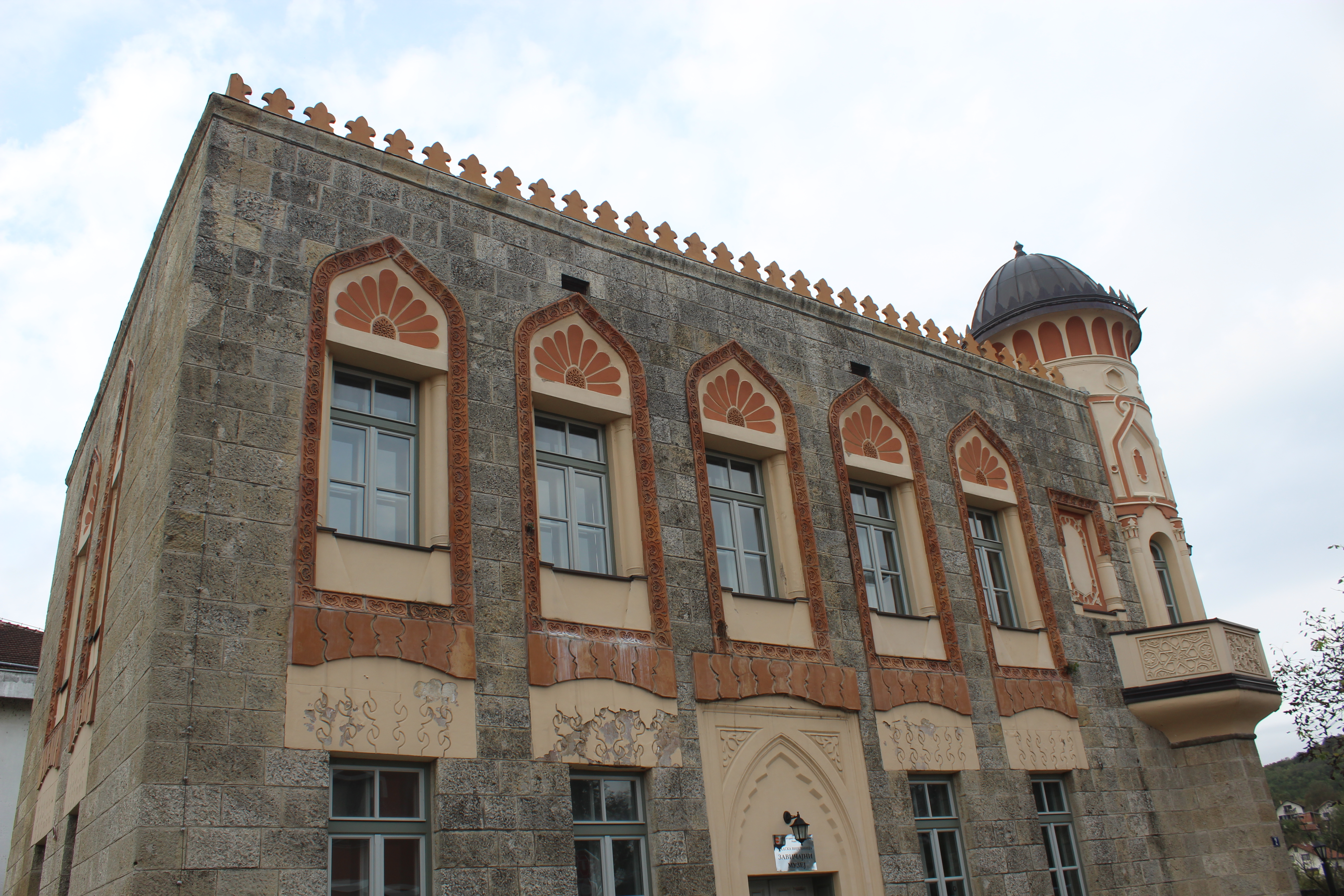
Novi Grad townhall

=== Art Nouveau and Secession style ===
Art Nouveau architecture
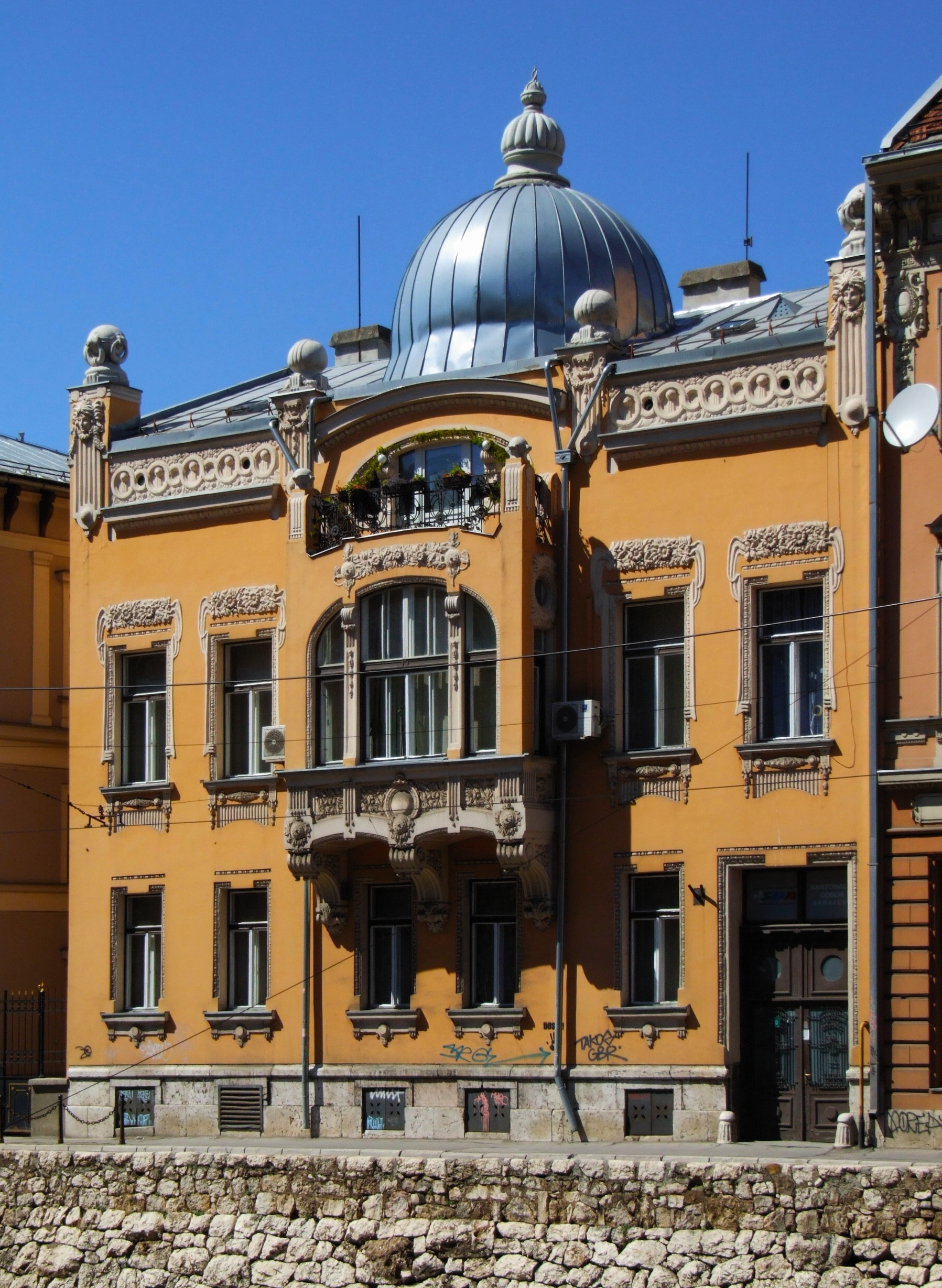
Ješua D. Salom Mansion in Sarajevo by Josip Vancaš (1901)

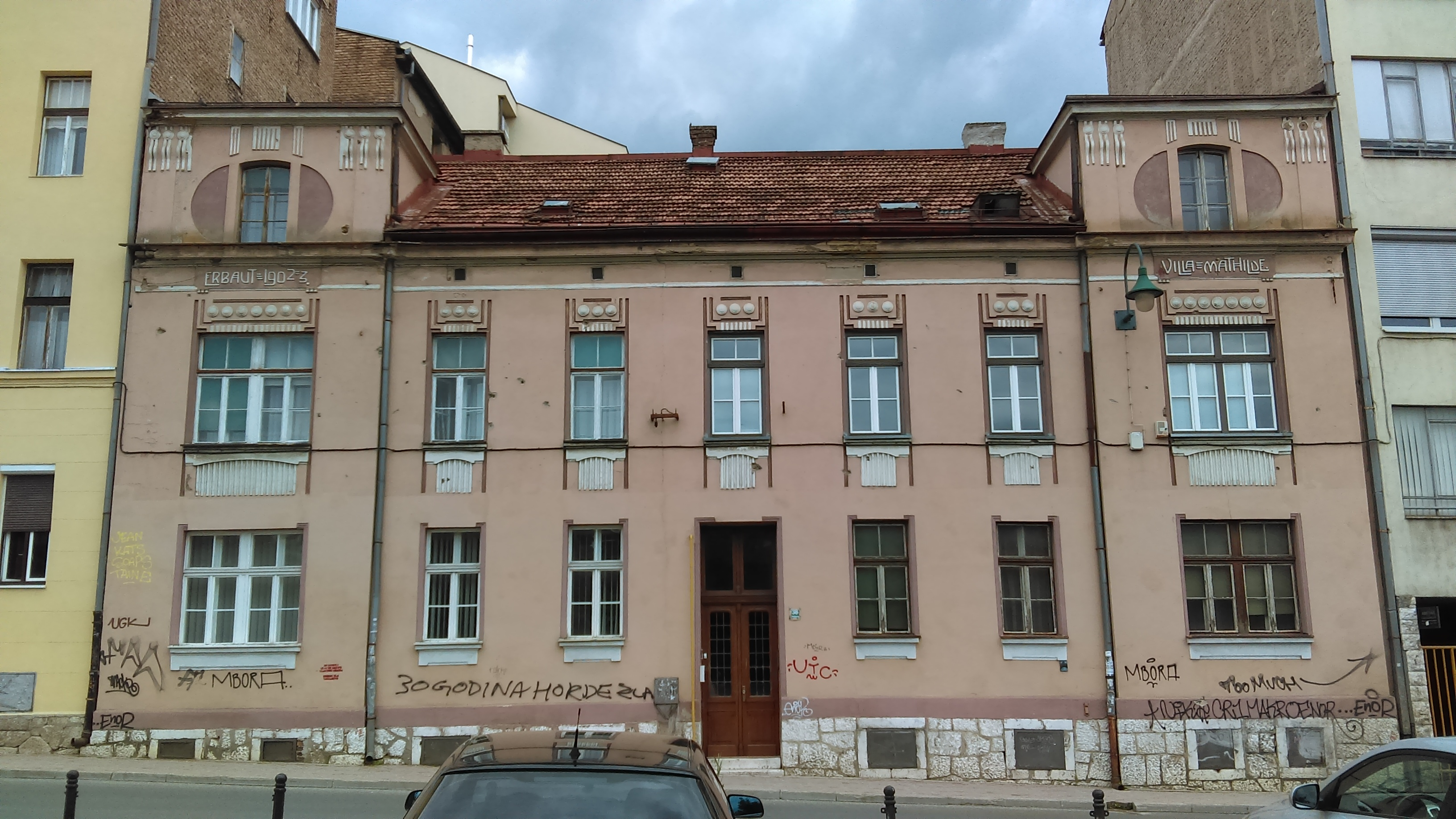
Villa Mathilde in Sarajevo by Josip Vancaš (1902–1903)

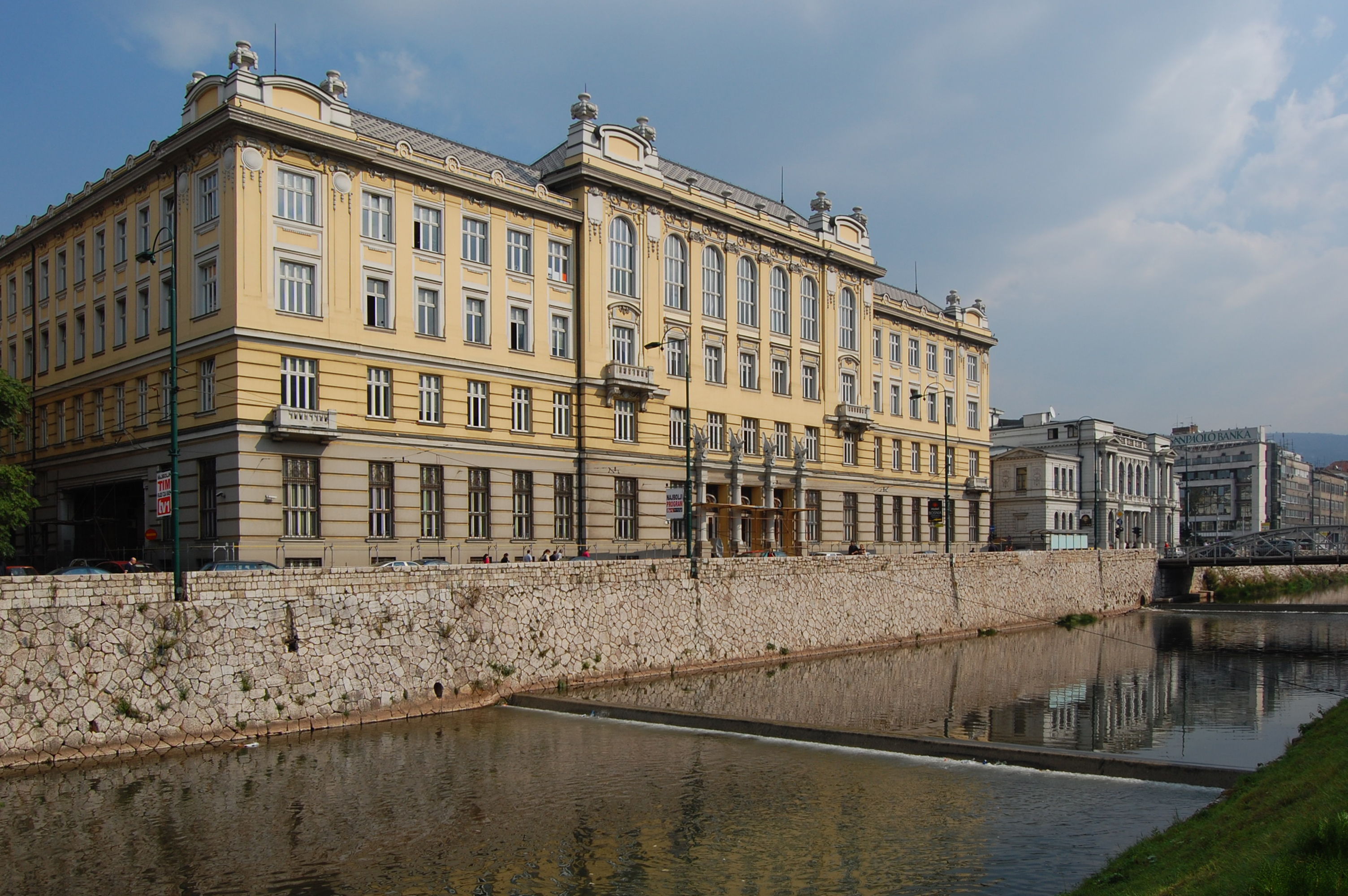
Central Post Office in Sarajevo by Josip Vancaš (1907–1913)
Vienna Secession architecture
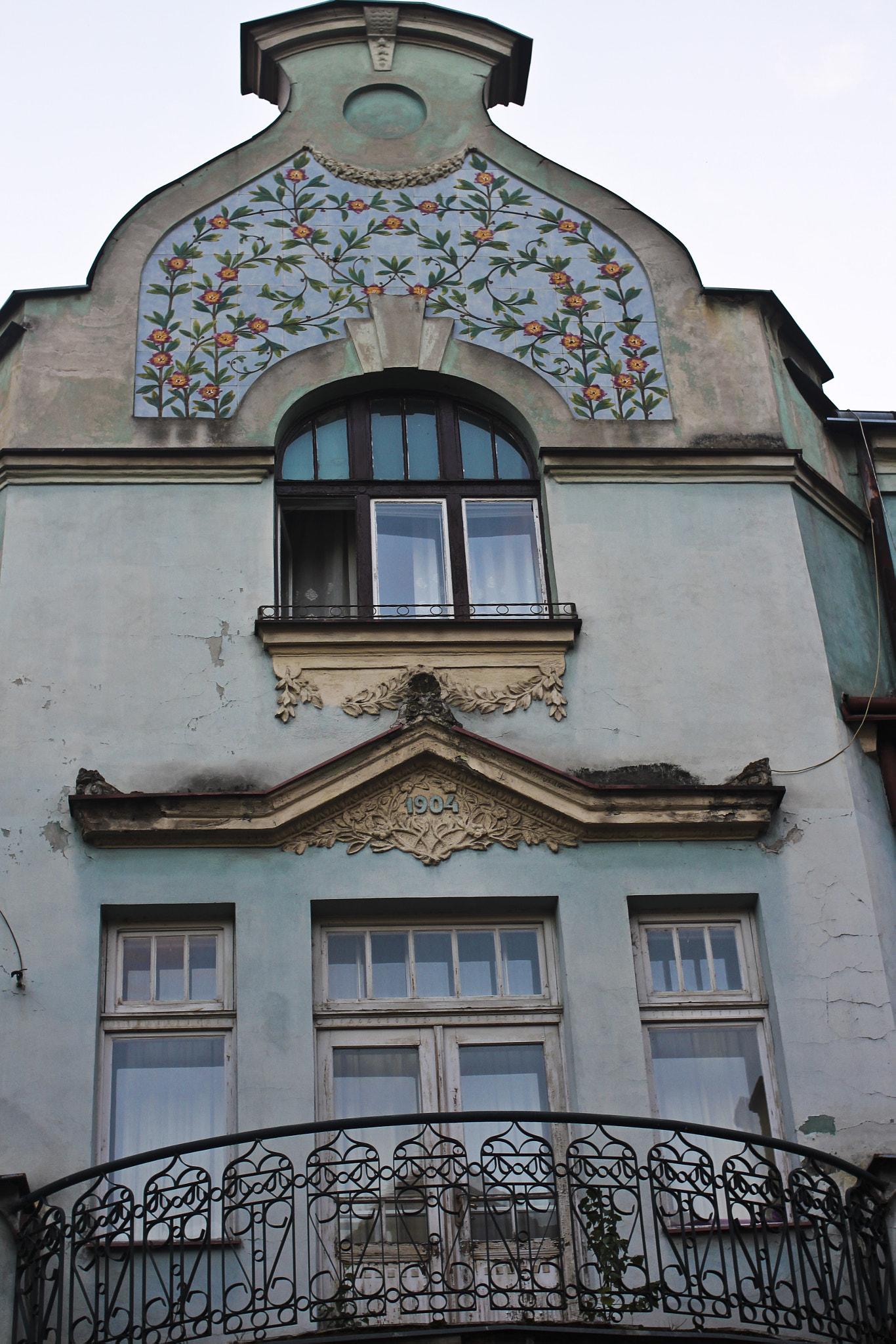
Villa Rädisch, Petrakijina 13 Sarajevo, by Rudolf Tönnies, 1906

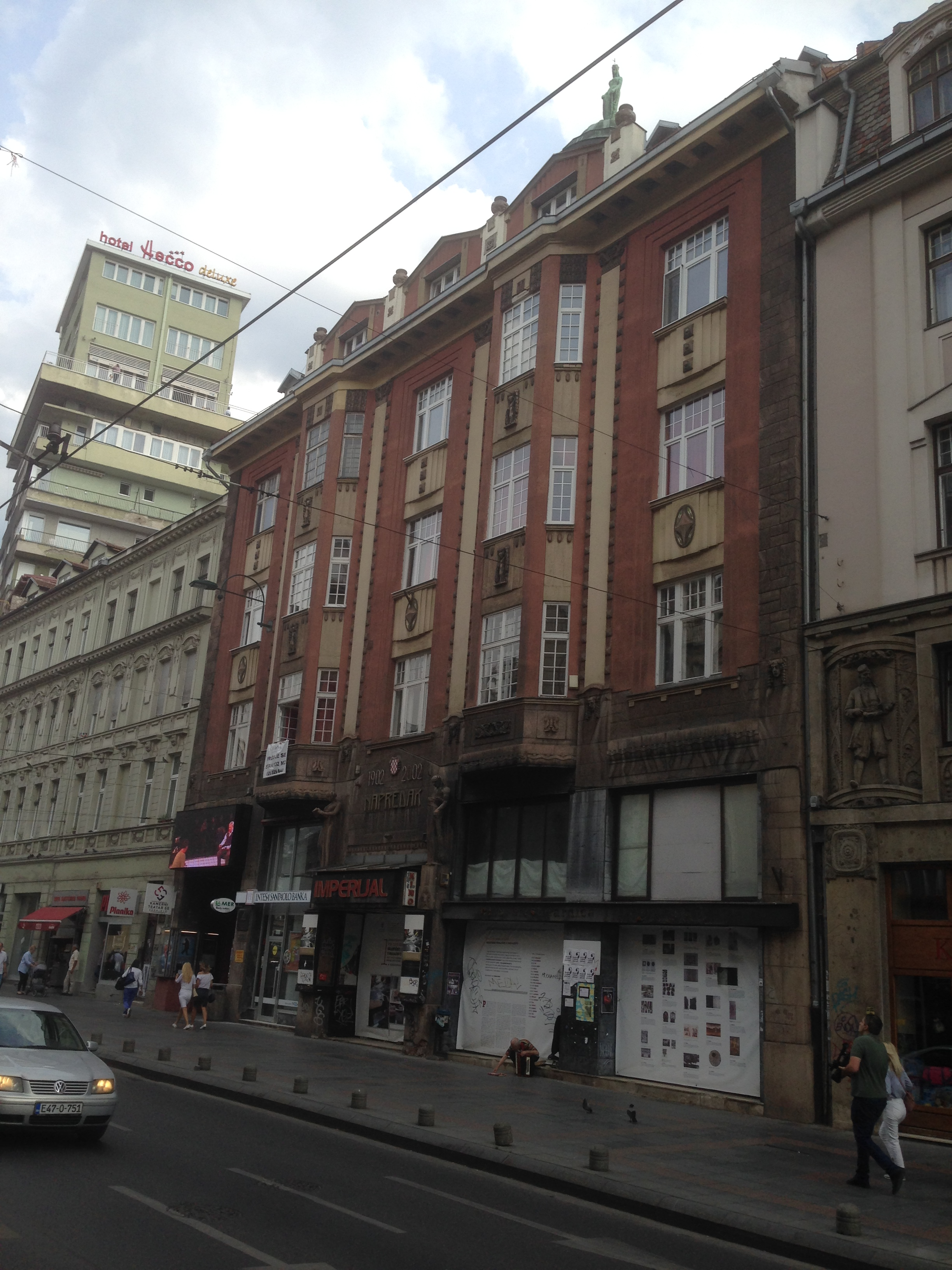
Napredak building, Titova, Sarajevo

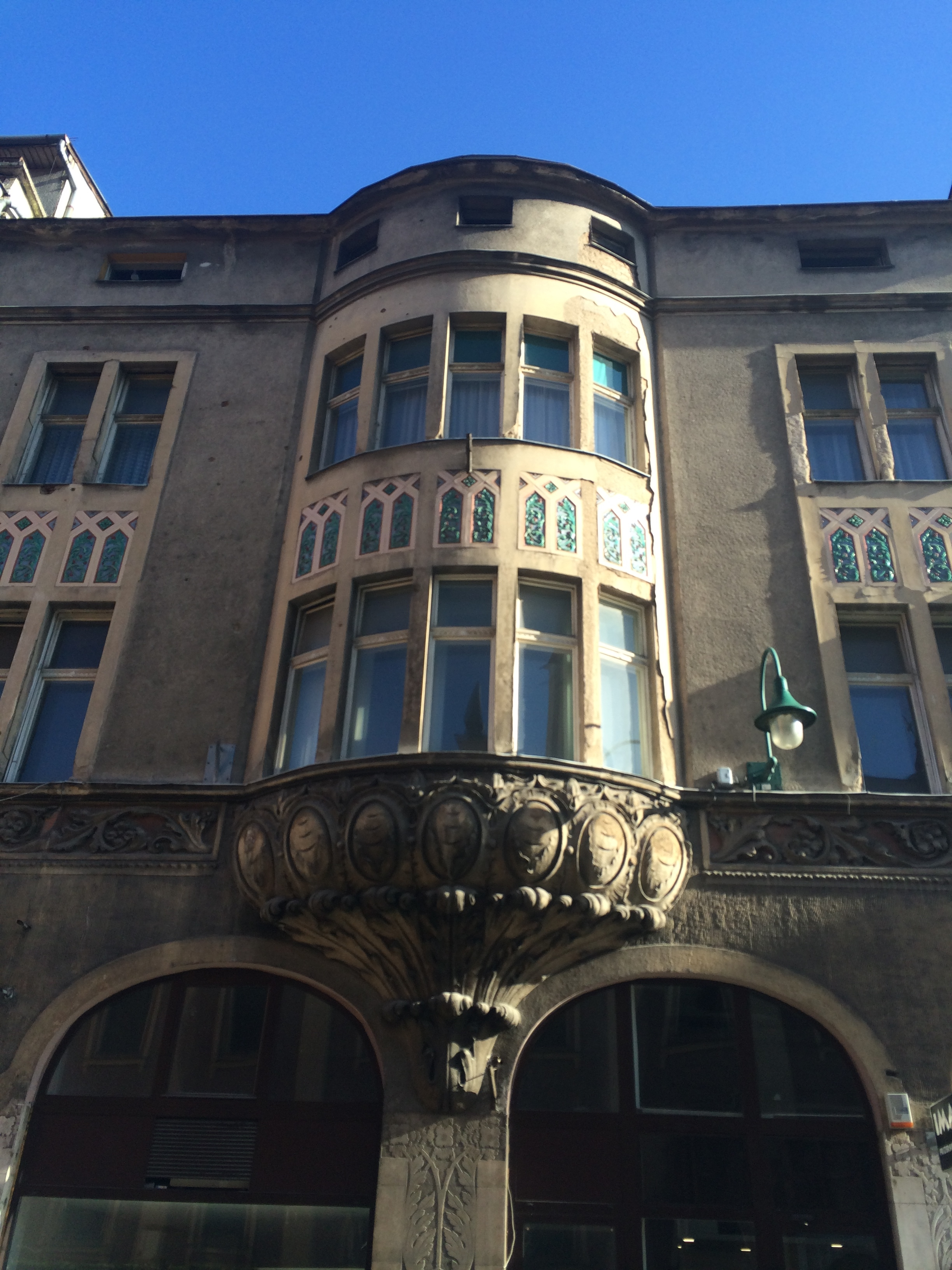
Residential and commercial building on Zelenih beretki, Sarajevo by Rudolf Tönnies, 1907

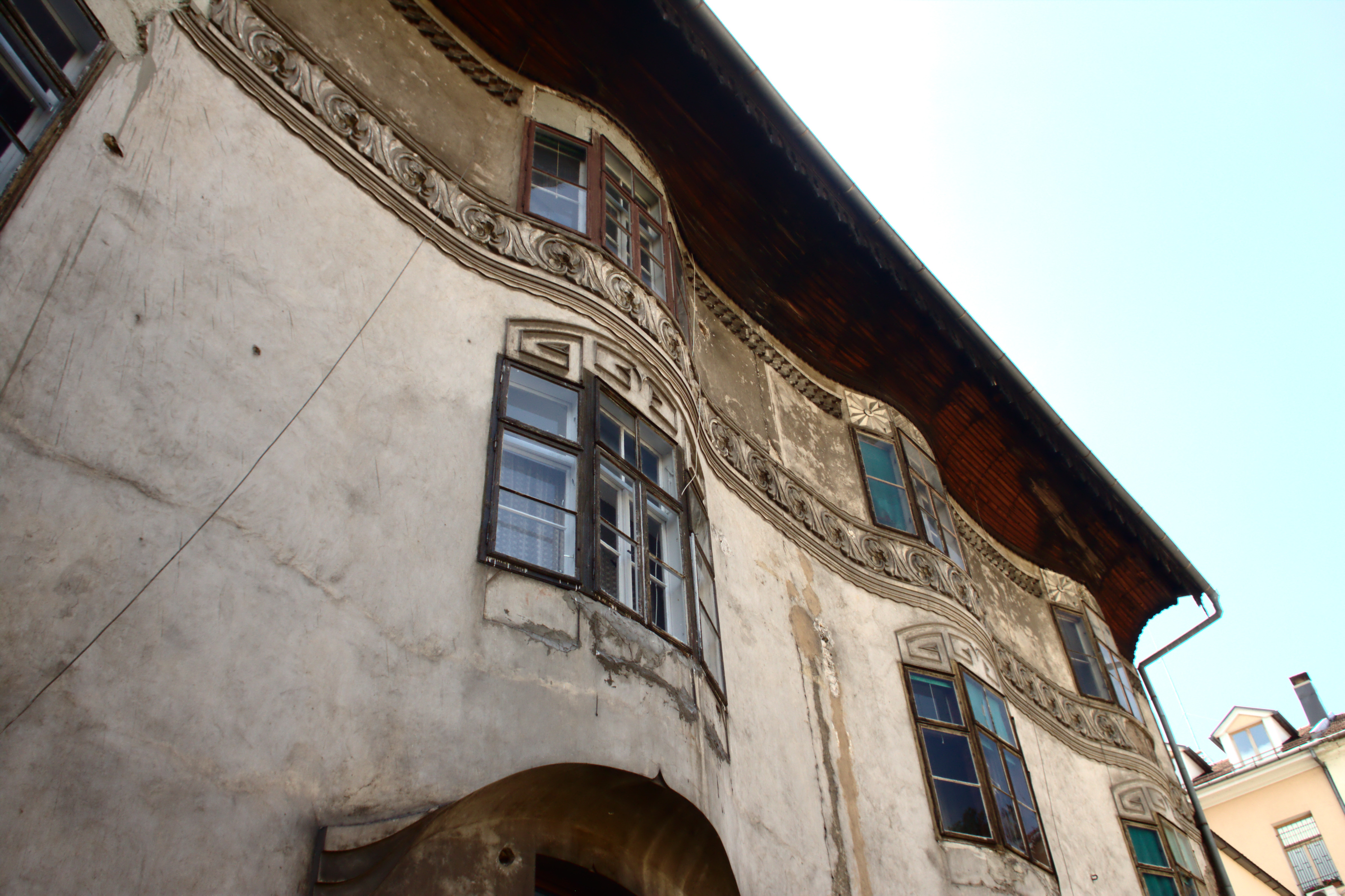
House of Mehmed-beg Fadilpašić. Franjevačka 2 Sarajevo, by Rudolf Tönnies, 1910.

=== Bosnian Style in architecture ===
The Bosnian style can be compared with Scandinavian National Romanticism. The Bosnian Style was championed by a younger generation of architects, like Czech architect Josip Pospišil, Slovene architect Rudolf Tönnies, and Austrian architect Ernst Lichtblau, who all studied at the Art Academy in Vienna with Karl von Hasenauer and Otto Wagner. The style was, however, named by Sarajevo's senior architect, Josip Vancaš, for whom many of these younger architects worked.

The Bosnian Style architects wanted to retrieve the vernacular architectural elements proper of Bosnia and Herzegovina, as opposed to the imported scripts of both historicist and Moorish Revival styles. The Bosnian Style may be "best understood as within the tradition of national romanticism", although its designers were not from within the nation they aimed to represent. Yet, Bosnian Style architects also made reference to historical rather than contemporary sources, and mainly to the Islamic component of the vernacular Bosnian architecture, thus resulting in "the substitution of one historicist collage for another" (Gunzburger-Makas and Damljanovic-Conley).

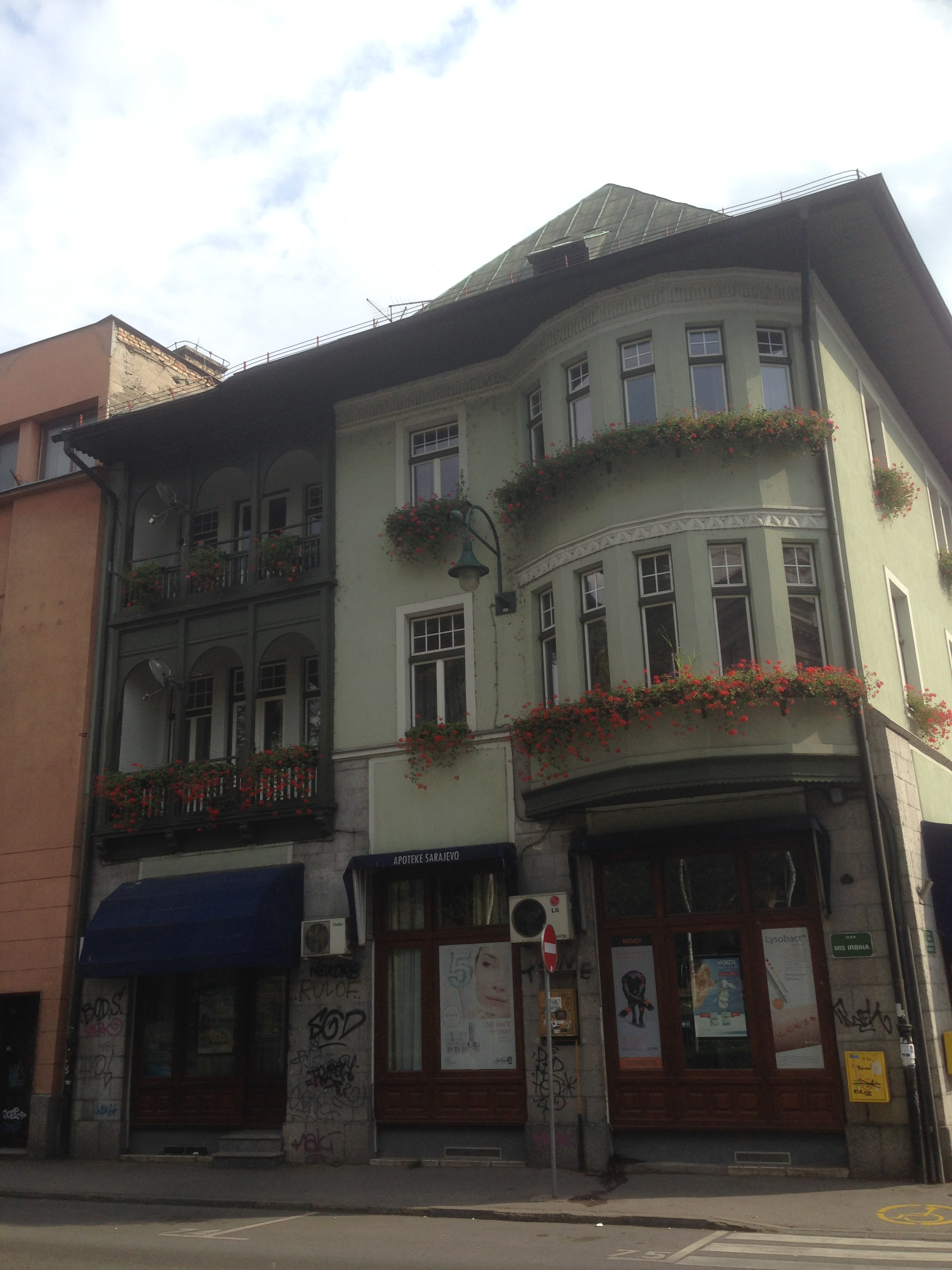
Building of the Land Waqf

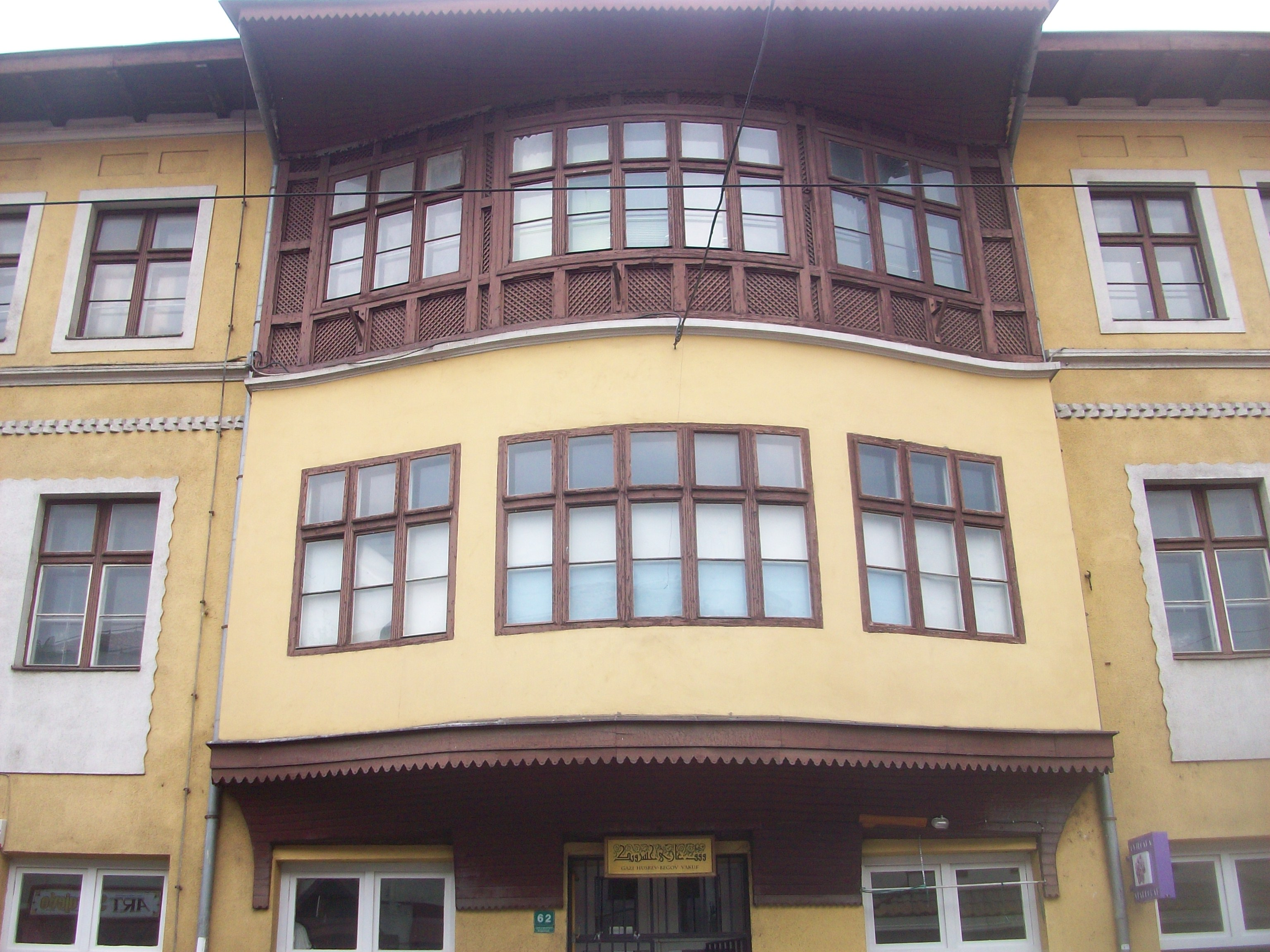
Hotel Stari Grad in Sarajevo, by Josip Vancaš (1909)

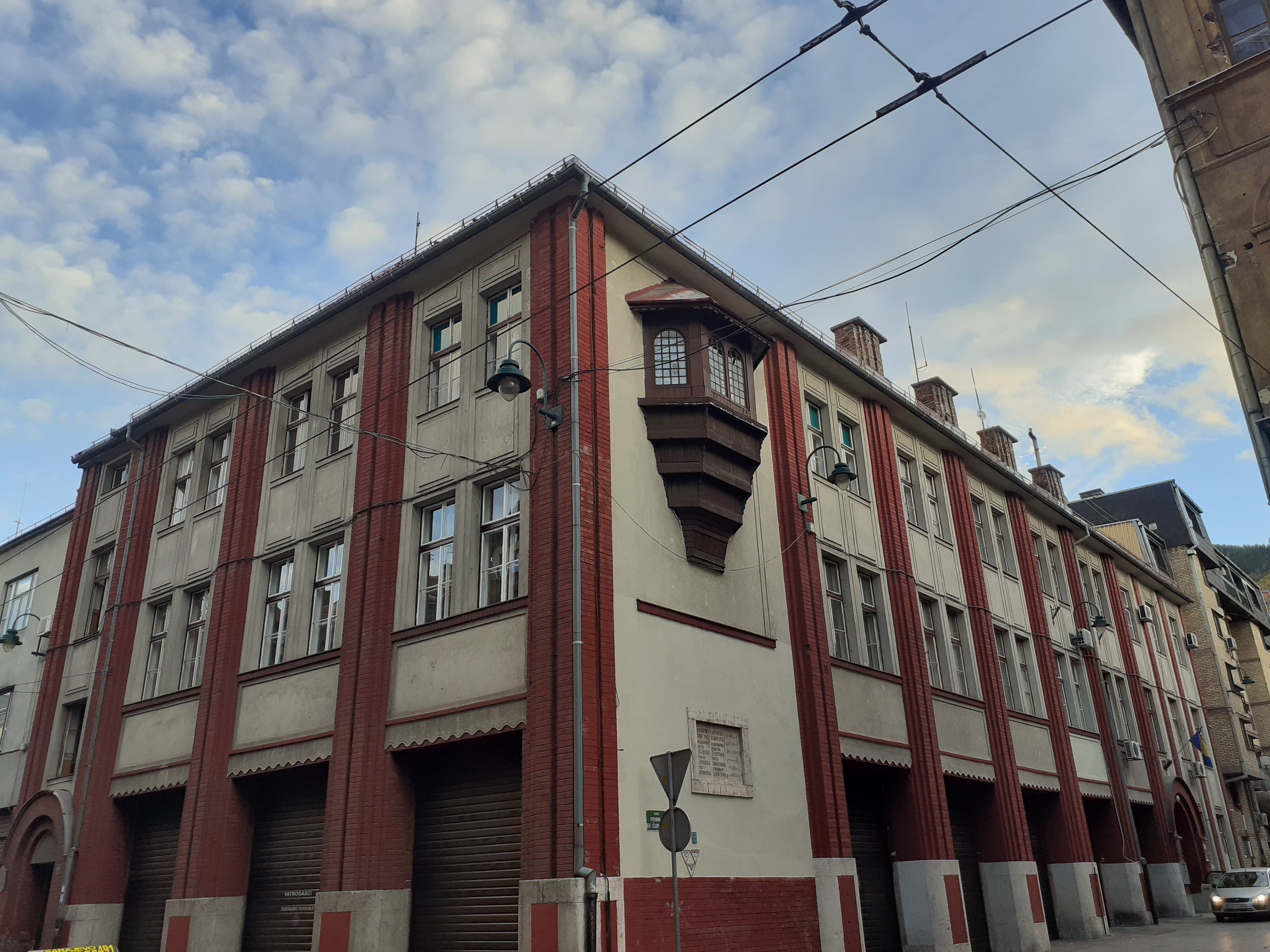
Sarajevo Fire Brigade barracks, by Josip Pospišil (1912)

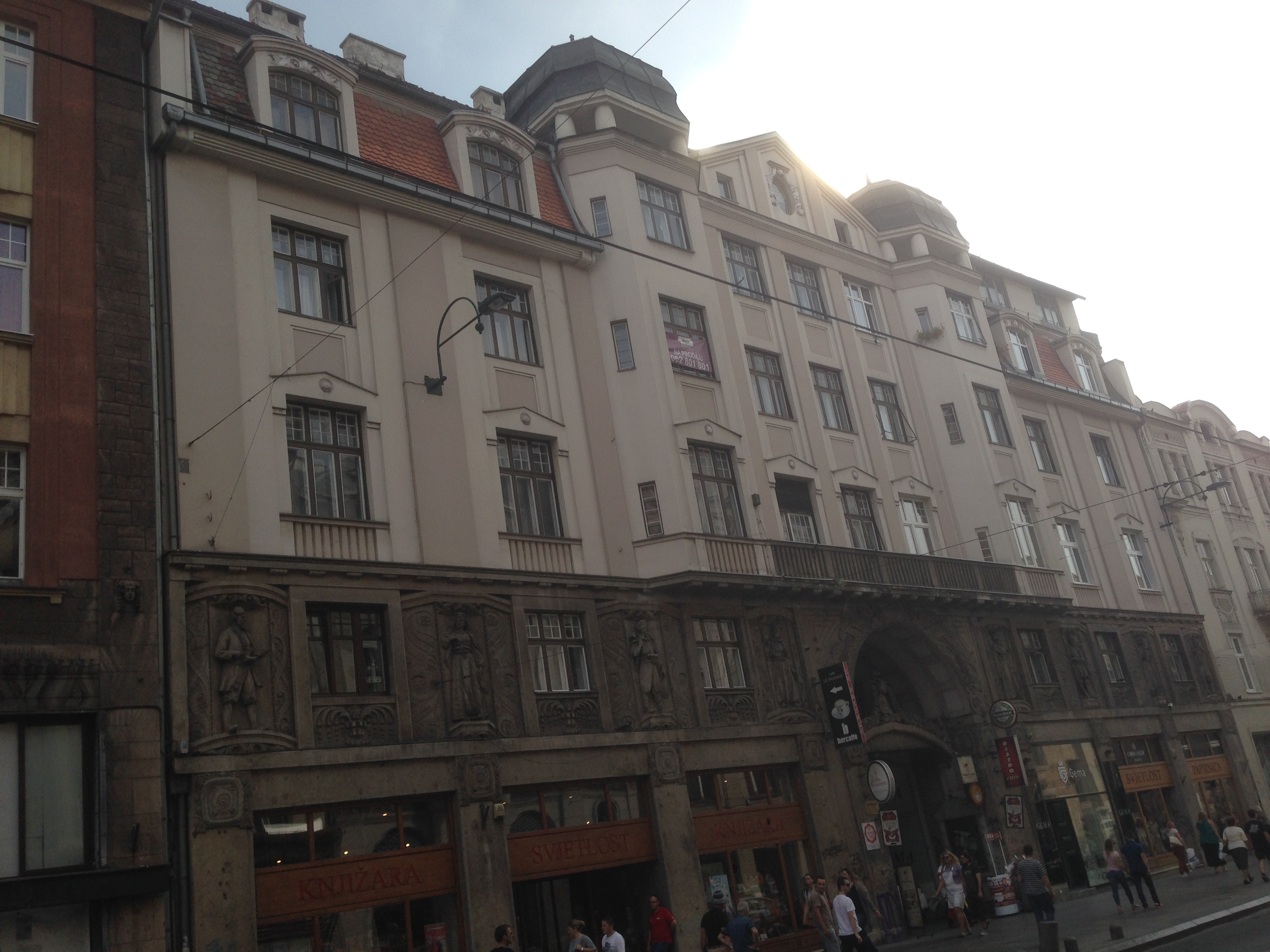
Salom Palace (Titova 34) by Josip Pospišil

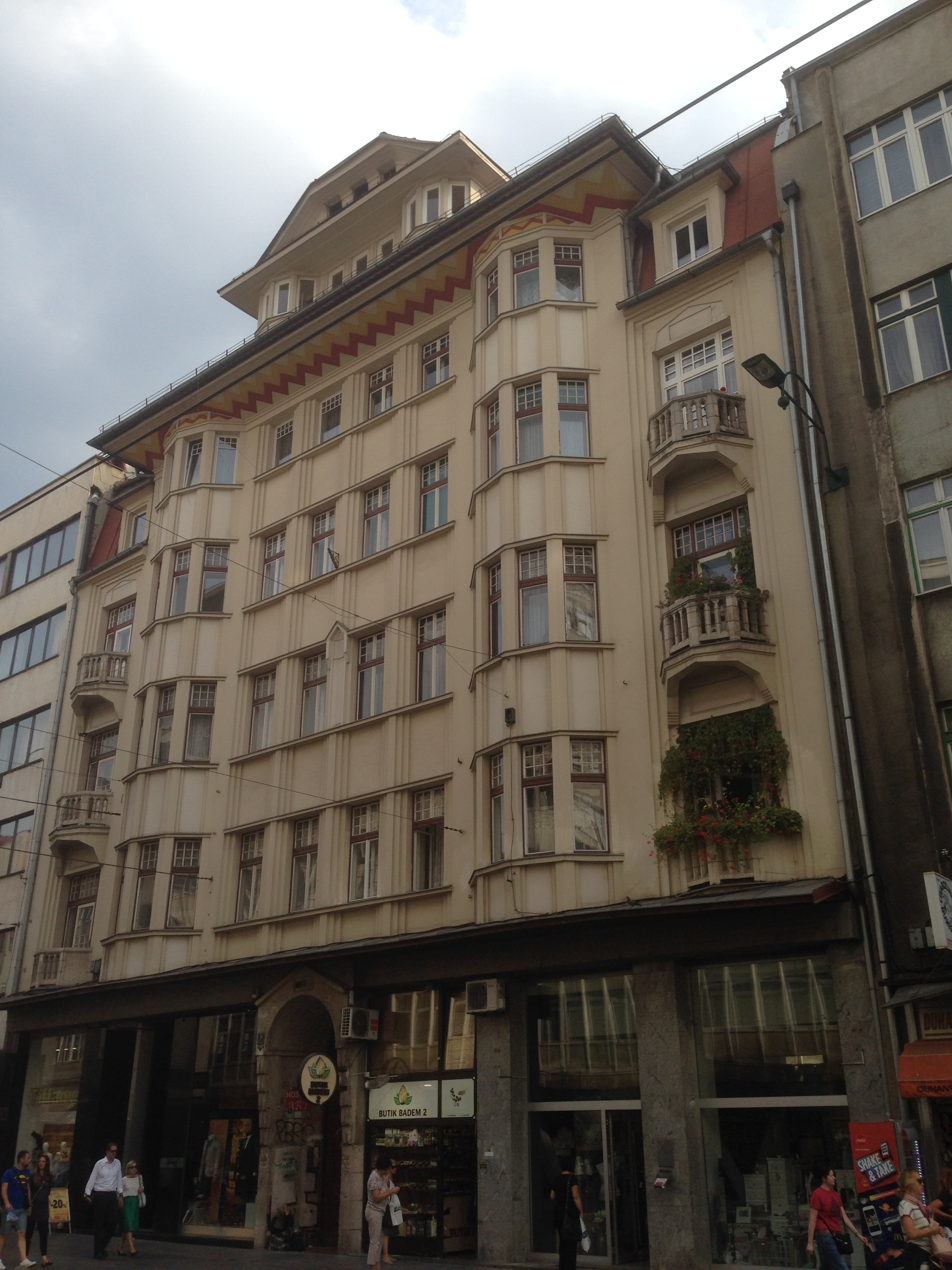
Musafija Palace by Josip Pospišil

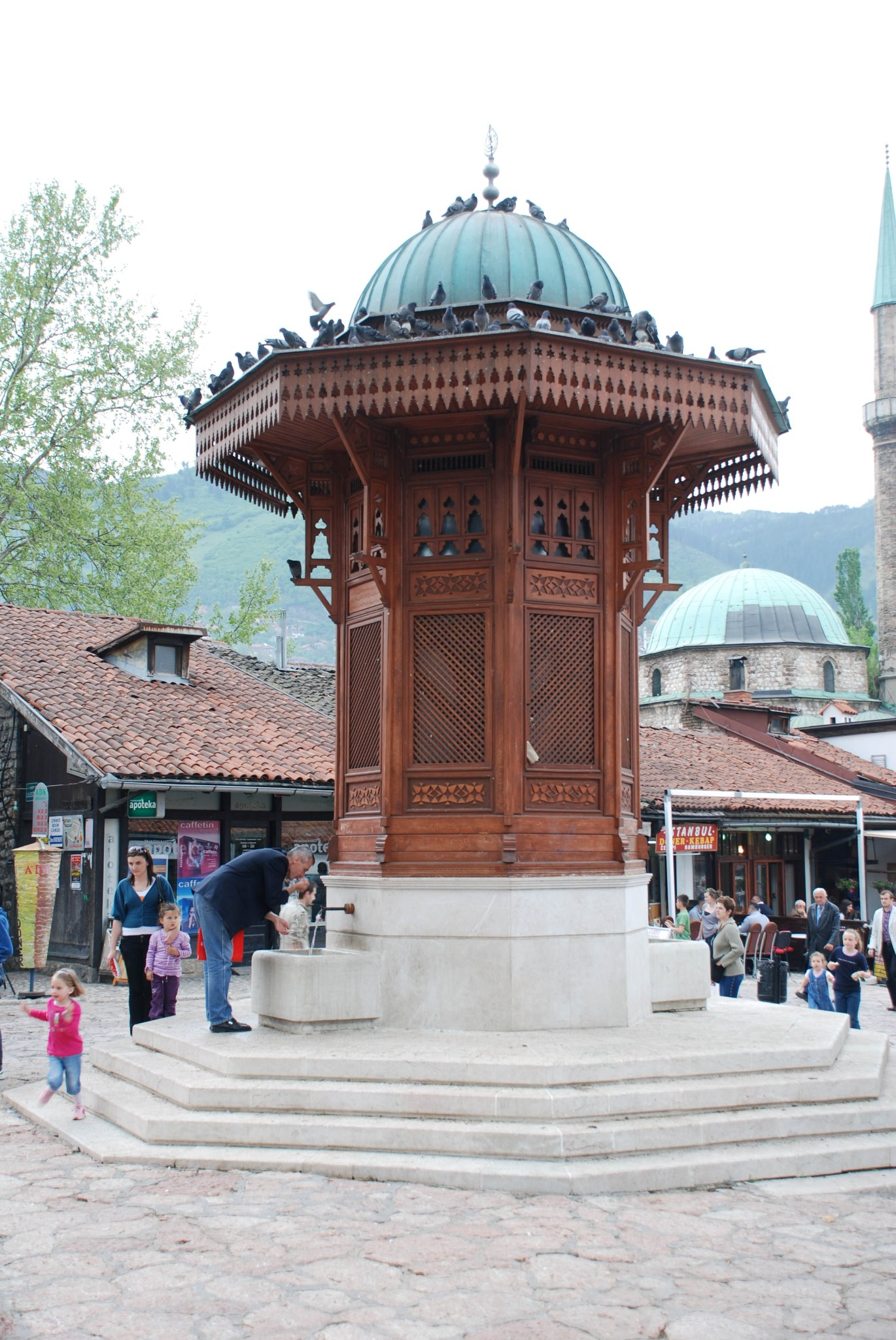
Sebilj in Baščaršija, Sarajevo

== Royalist Yugoslav period ==
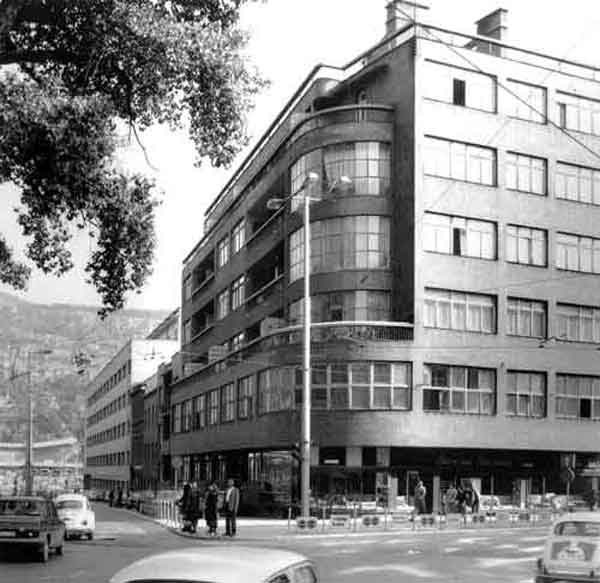
Pension Fund building, Muhamed and Reuf Kadić, 1941–1943

Bosnia and Herzegovina joined the Kingdom of Serbs, Croats and Slovenes in 1918, whose official architecture became more and more dictated by an increasingly concentrated national authority which sought to establish a unified state identity.

Bosnia and Herzegovina remained at the margin of interwar architectural modernism in Yugoslavia. Dušan Smiljanić and Helen Baldasar, who taught at the Technical High School in Sarajevo since 1924, were among the first to bring modernist ideas to Sarajevo in the 1920s. Later, D. Smiljanić became a municipal architect in a short time, and until 1939 he had his own architectural firm. Helen Baldasar designed buildings that represent the first built buildings of modern architecture in Sarajevo: the Bembaša Baths, the Red Cross Society building, and the Bratinska-Rašidagić building.

Several residential units were built in 1933–1941 in Crni Vrh by various architects from around the country. The Crni Vrh estate was built on a hill overlooking the urbanised centre, facing south and among greenery. The estate is protected since 2012, despite various status of conservation.

After having studied in Prague, the brothers Muhamed and Reuf Kadić were active in Sarajevo in those years. Based on the achievements of cubism and neoplasticism, strove to create a free and pure geometric architectural form. Their work was dominated by the ideas of healthy functionalism, advocating the synthesis of content and form, especially in the culture of housing. Reuf Kadić's main work, 1939 House Kopčić, reinterprets traditional elements (courtyard, facade erkers, eaves, hipped roof) in line with new modern conceptions. They also designed the Mekteb residential building at the corner of Ferhadija and Ćemaluša. In 1940 their Pension Fund Building was opened, exhibiting "reduced forms geometrically 'clean' surfaces and volumes".

Within the limits imposed by the socio-economic conditions, the Vakuf institution had become a powerful investor, and thanks to these architects, Vakuf buildings are usually utilitarian and constructivist in concept:

- Vakuf Hadži Idriz Palace (D. Smiljanić)
- Vakuf Jakub paša building (D. Smiljanić)
- Residential and business building of Vakuf Čokadži Sulejman (Muhamed and Reuf Kadić)
- Vakuf Hovadž Kemaludin's residential and business building in Ferhadija Street, on the site of a former mekteb (Muhamed and Reuf Kadić)
- The Pension Fund building was built in 1943 (Muhamed and Reuf Kadić)

Juraj Neidhardt came to Bosnia and Herzegovina in 1937 from Le Corbusier's studio, and together with the theorist of architecture Dušan Grabrijan he worked on the synthesis of the universal and the local. His most notable achievements were the Philosophy Faculty Building (1955–59), the Institute of Physics and Chemistry (1959–1964) and the urban planning for the Marindvor Center.

Other works:

- The Damić House at 10 Radićeva Street in Sarajevo was built according to a 1926 project by Helen Baldasar and Dušan Smiljanić.
- The building of the National Bank of Bosnia and Herzegovina was built in 1932 according to the project of the Belgrade architect Milan Zloković.
- The FIS Sports Center in Sarajevo was built according to the first-prize-winning conceptual design from 1936 by Zagreb architects Hink Bauer and Marijan Haberle.
- Skyscraper of the Railway Savings Cooperative in Sarajevo, built in 1938, designed by Isidor Rice.
- Social Security Building in Mostar (architect Drago Ibler, member of the progressive Zagreb group "Zemlja", founded in 1929)
- Palace of the Defterder Pasha's endowment in Banja Luka (Stjepan Planić, member of the group "Zemlja")
- City Savings Bank in Sarajevo (Mate Bajlon, educated in Vienna, built numerous schools and apartment buildings)
- Sarajevo Stock Exchange Building, (Mate Bajlon)
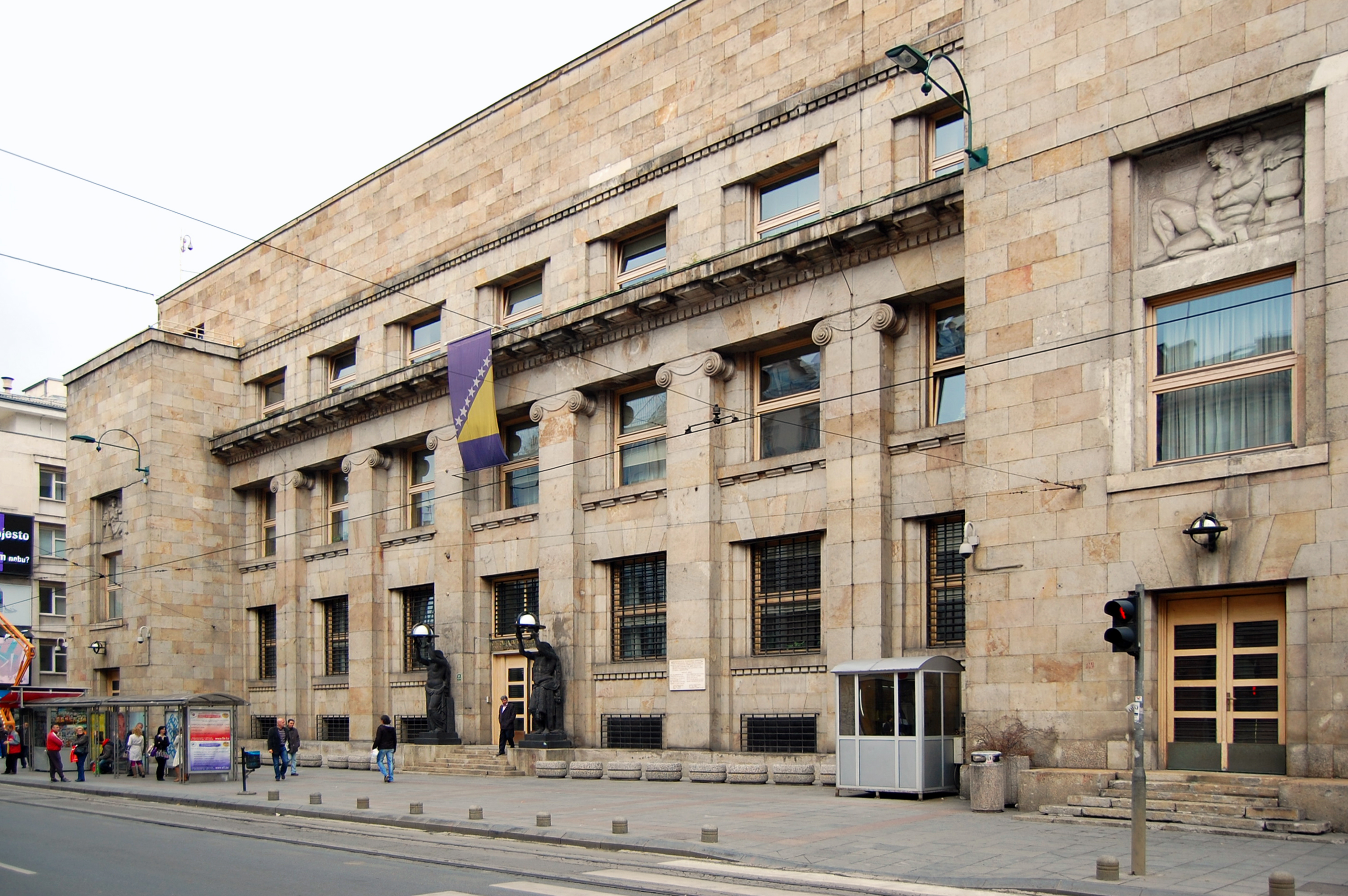
Central Bank of Bosnia and Herzegovina, by Milan Zloković, 1929

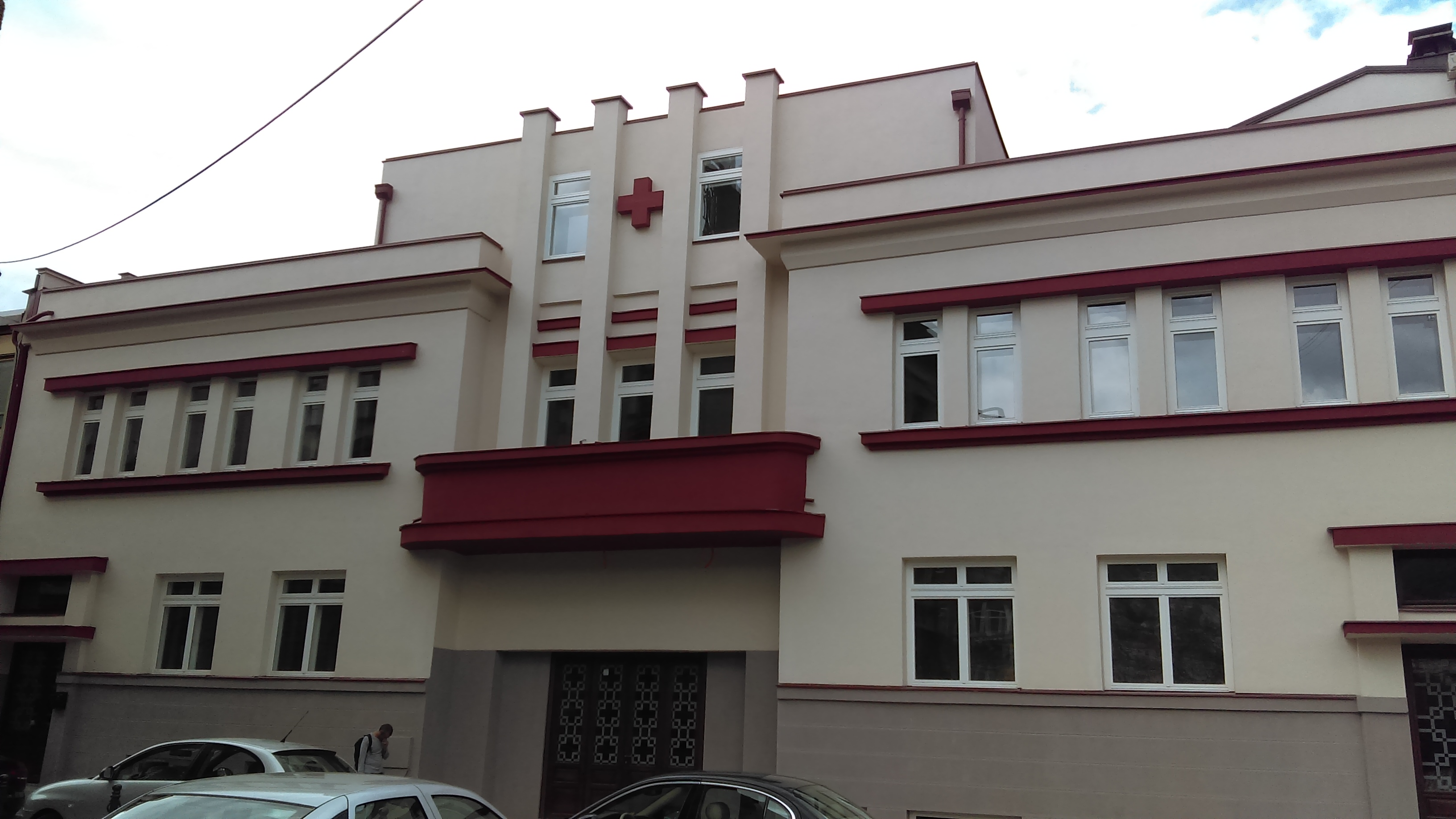
Red Cross building, by Helen Baldasar, 1928

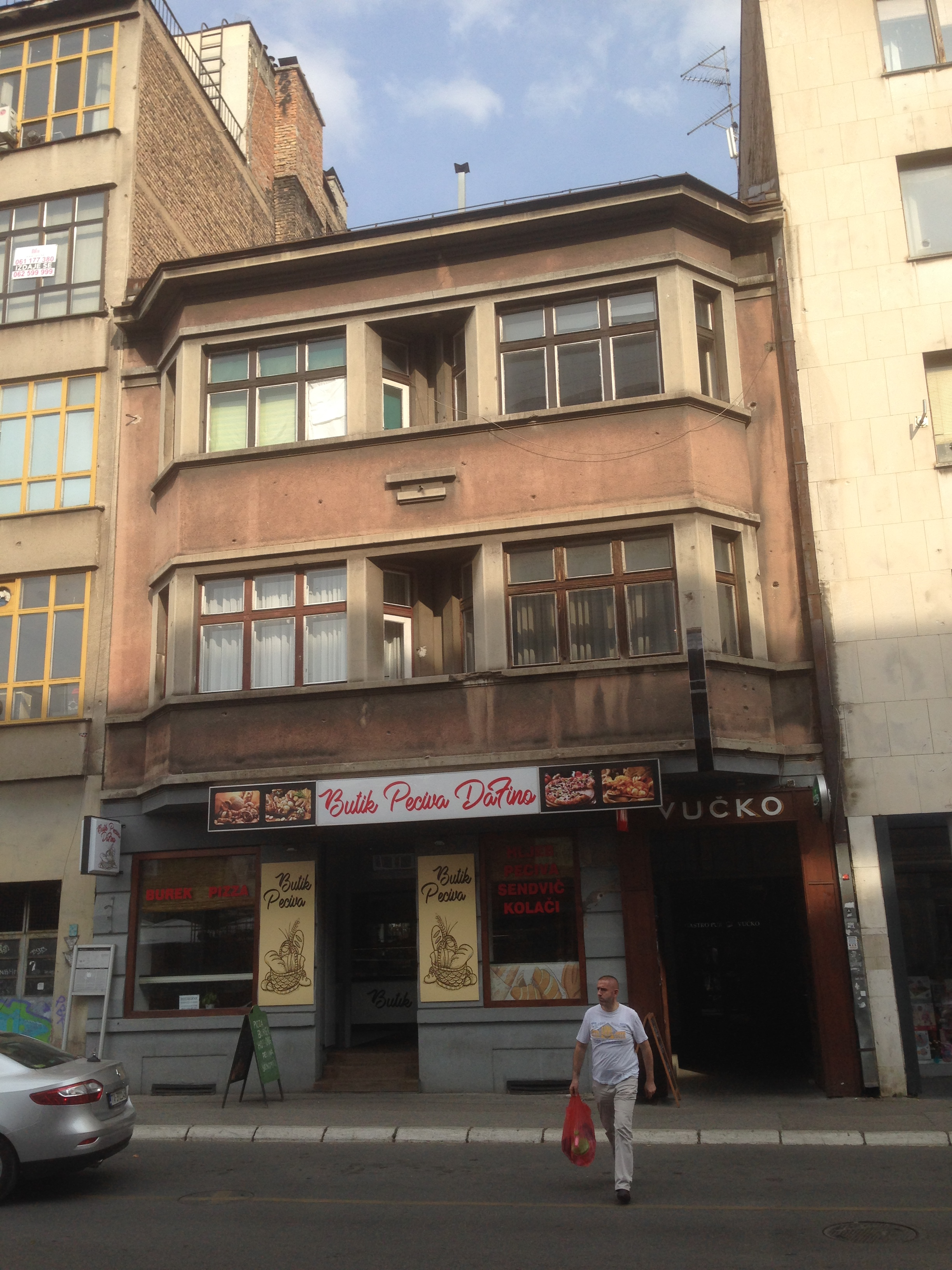
Damić House at 10 Radićeva, 1926

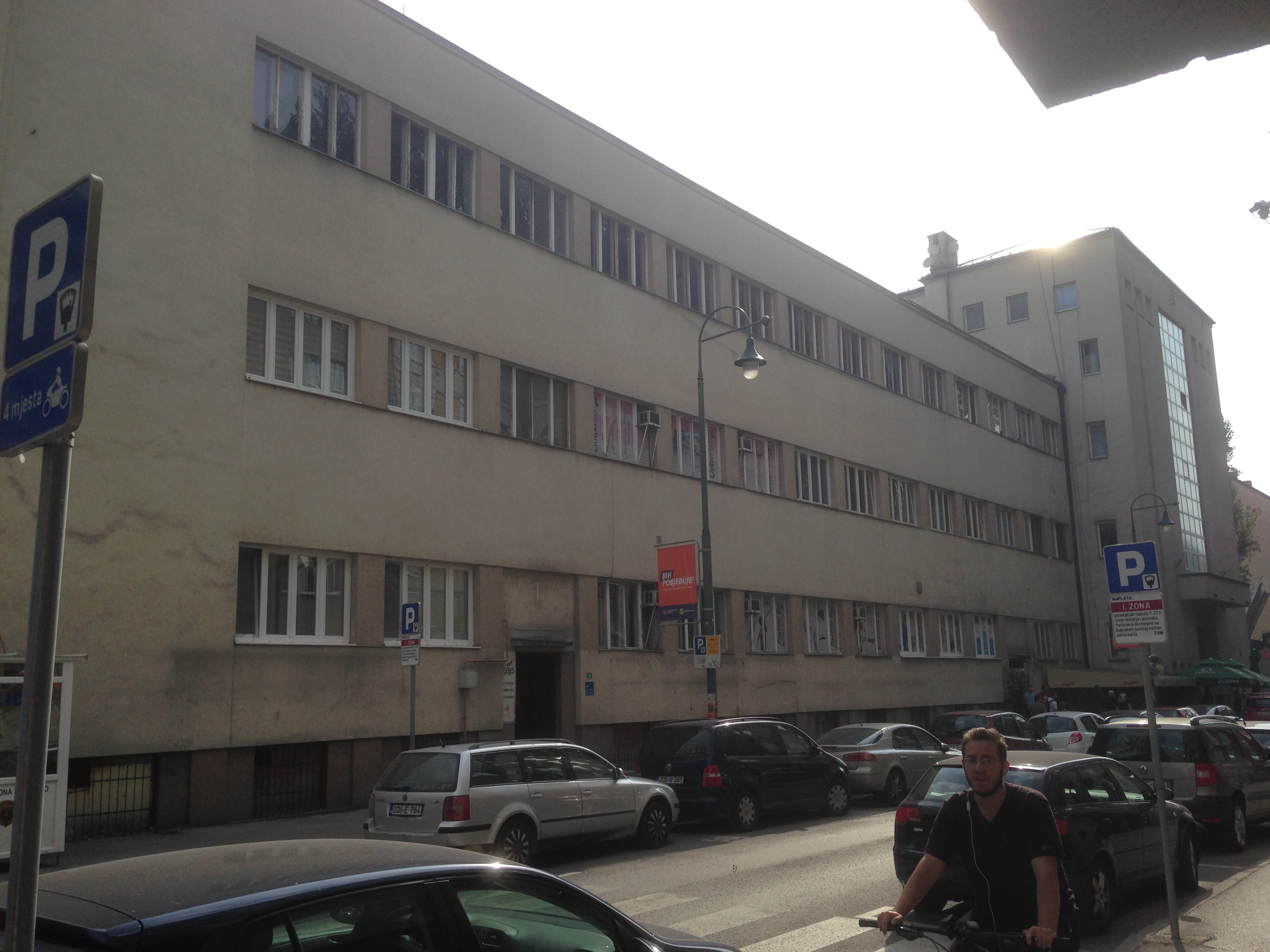
Sarajevo - sportski centar FIS, 1936

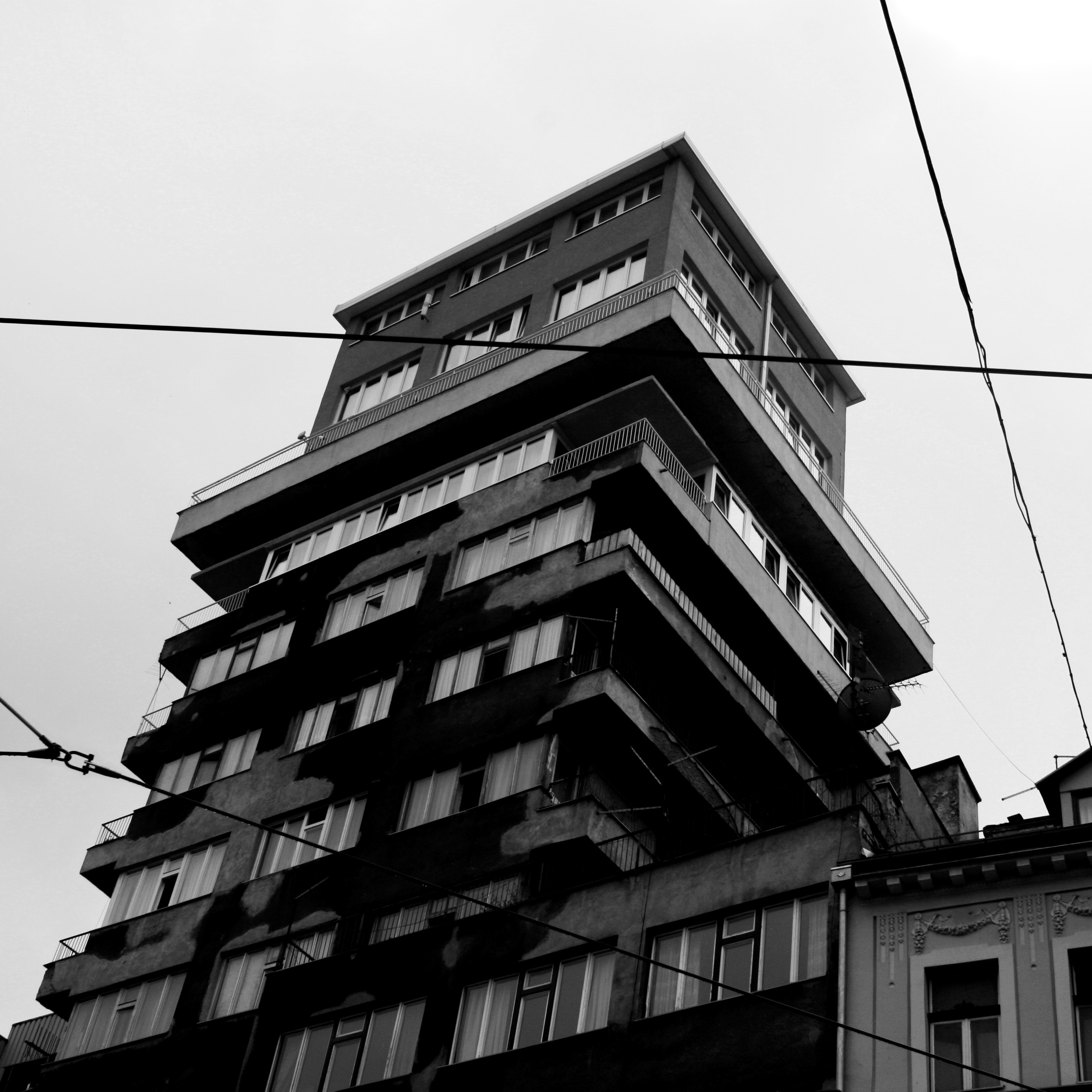
JAT skyscraper, Muhamed and Reuf Kadić, 1947

== Socialist Yugoslav period ==
Iconic Holiday Inn, as well as one of the UNITIC World Trade Towers in Sarajevo, both by Ivan Štraus.

At the end of World War II Bosnia and Herzegovina became a republic in the Socialist Federal Republic of Yugoslavia. Immediately following the Second World War, Yugoslavia's brief association with the Eastern Bloc ushered in a short period of socialist realism.

This came to an abrupt end with the 1948 Tito–Stalin Split. In the following years, modernist architecture came to symbolize the nation's break from the USSR (a notion that later diminished with growing acceptability of modernism in the Eastern Bloc).

With 1950s decentralization and liberalization policies, architecture became increasingly fractured along ethnic lines. Architects increasingly focused on building with reference to the architectural heritage of their individual socialist republics in the form of critical regionalism. A notable example of this shift is Juraj Neidhardt and Dušan Grabrijan's seminal 1957 publication Architecture of Bosnia and the way into modernity (Croatian: Arhitektura Bosne i Put U Suvremeno) which sought to understand modernism through the lens of Bosnia's Ottoman heritage. Growing distinction of individual ethnic architectural identities within Yugoslavia was exacerbated with the 1972 decentralization of the formerly centralized historical preservation authority, providing individual regions further opportunity to critically analyze their own cultural narratives.

In the late 1950s and early 1960s Brutalism began to garner a following within Yugoslavia, particularly among younger architects.

The Yugoslav break from Soviet socialist realism combined with efforts to commemorate World War II, which together led to the creation of an immense quantity of abstract sculptural war memorials, known today as spomenik.

Political currents in Yugoslavia favored industrialization that required an emphasis on development of public housing to serve migration of population from rural to urban areas. To overcome cultural conflicts anti-historicism with modern architectural vocabulary became a prevalent design strategy for the majority of architectural projects. Hence homogeneity of materials replaced traditional heterogeneity and concrete became a material of choice for construction. Such practices, however, caused several problems. Industrialization caused pollution of cities but more importantly it caused flight from rural areas that further caused discrepancies in production, which damaged the economy. There was insufficiency of infrastructure, electricity, water and central heating to sustain new public housing development due to poor planning while residential skyscrapers inappropriately intermingled with existing architectural context. Poor construction methods and lack of quality due to lack of resources caused unhealthy living environments. All these issues led to diminishing cultural identity of Bosnia and Herzegovina while draining its natural and human resources.

On the other hand, there were few architectural projects that attempted to address issues of cultural diversity. Residential House "Dino" in Sarajevo built in 1987 by Amir Vuk and Mirko Marić was one of those attempts. It is the duplex residential house where one follows the oriental architectural vocabulary while the other has rather western European philosophy of the façade organization while they share a common entrance. Another example is the Holiday Inn Hotel built in 1983 and the "Unis" Twin Towers built in Sarajevo in 1986 and designed by Ivan Štraus. Among the people of the city, the twin towers are commonly called Momo (Serbian name) and Uzeir (Bosniak name). There is no consensus among the people of the city which tower carried the Serbian or Bosnian name. This ambiguity of the names accentuated the cultural unity as its primary architectural quality.

Modernist architecture
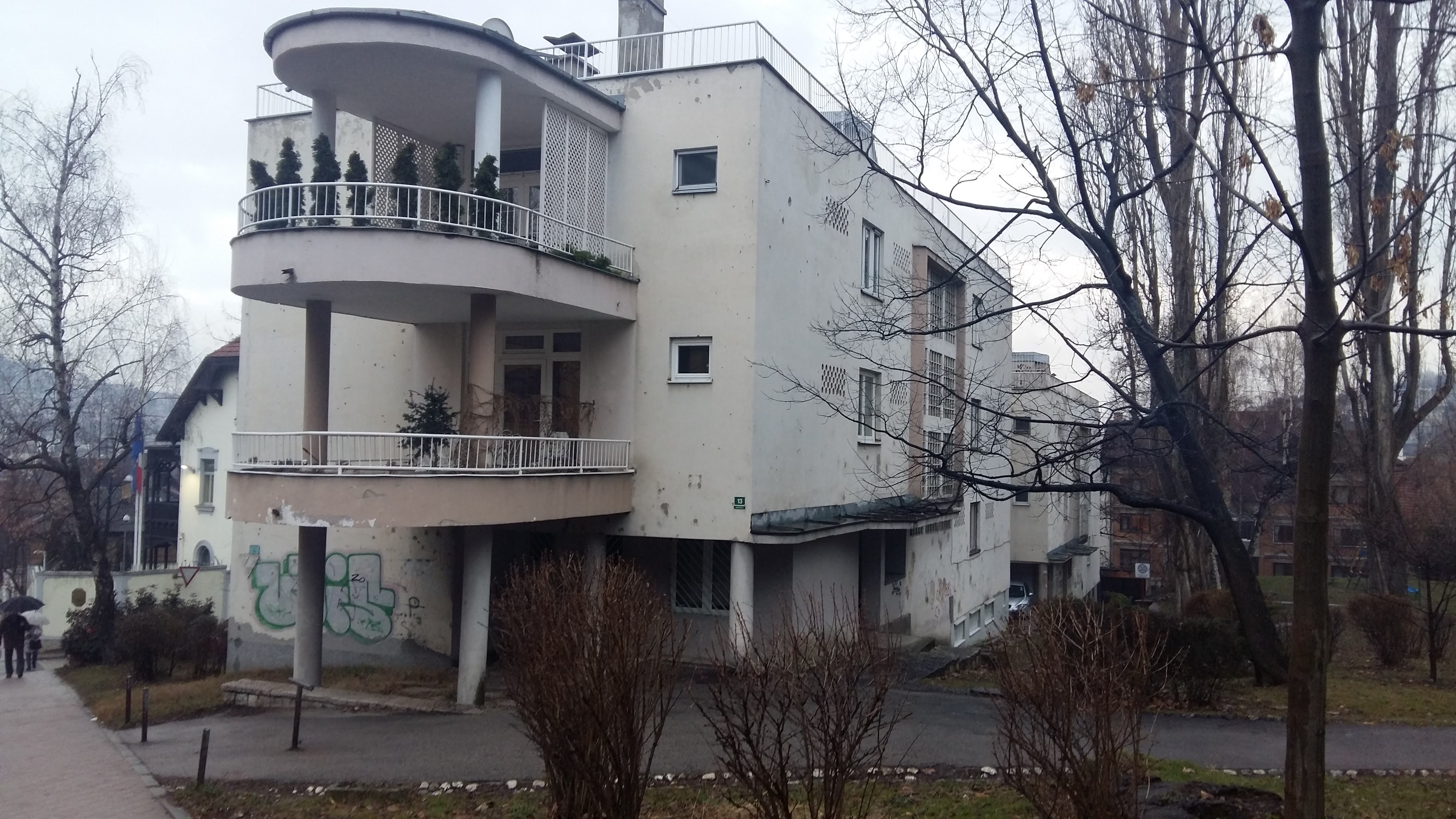
Džidžikovac residential complex (Muhamed and Reuf Kadić, 1947–48)

Sarajevo main railway station (Bedřich Hacar, Bogdan Stojkov, 1949)

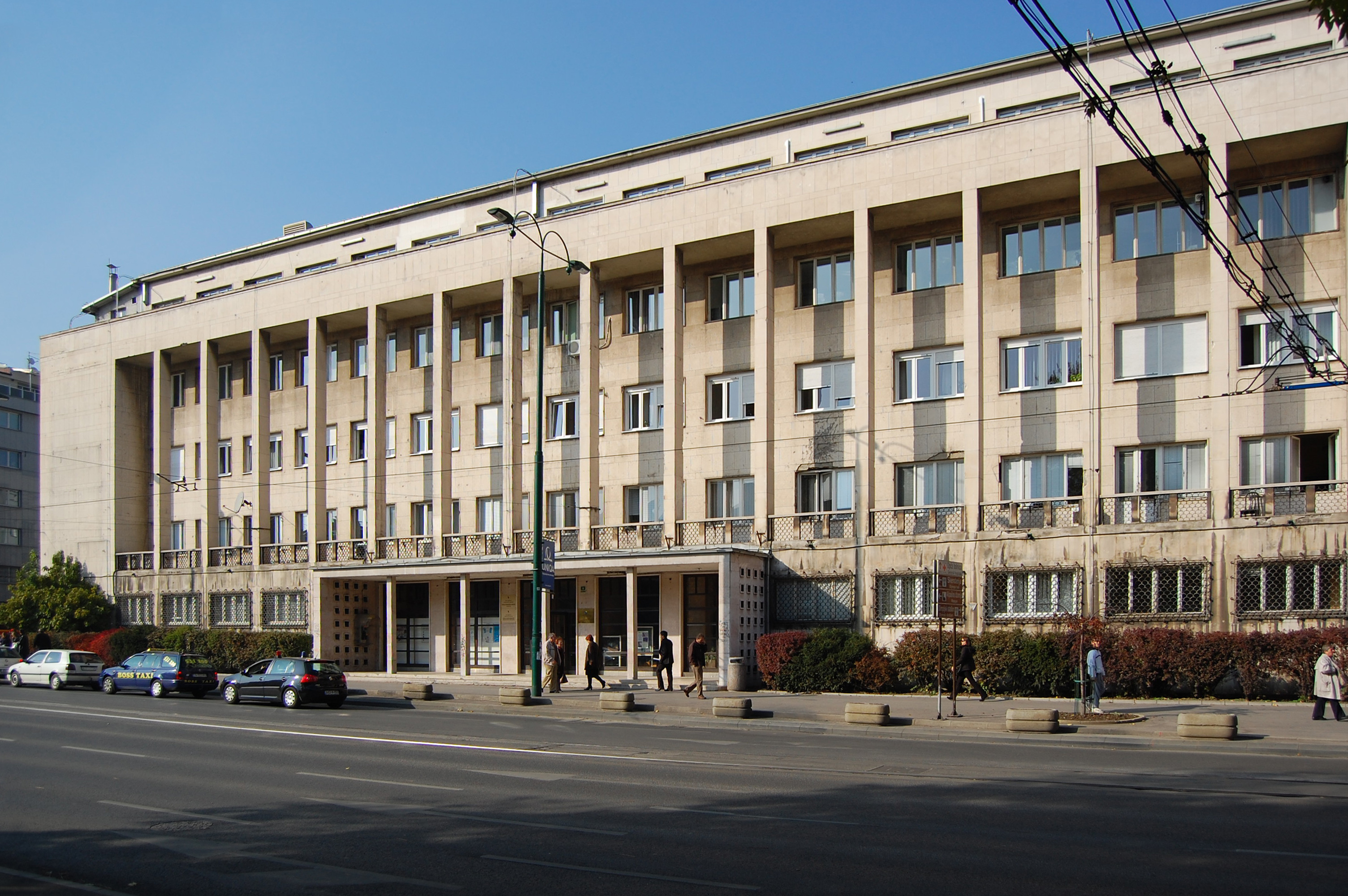
Sarajevo Public Health Institute / Higijenski zavod (Tihomir Ivanović, 1950)

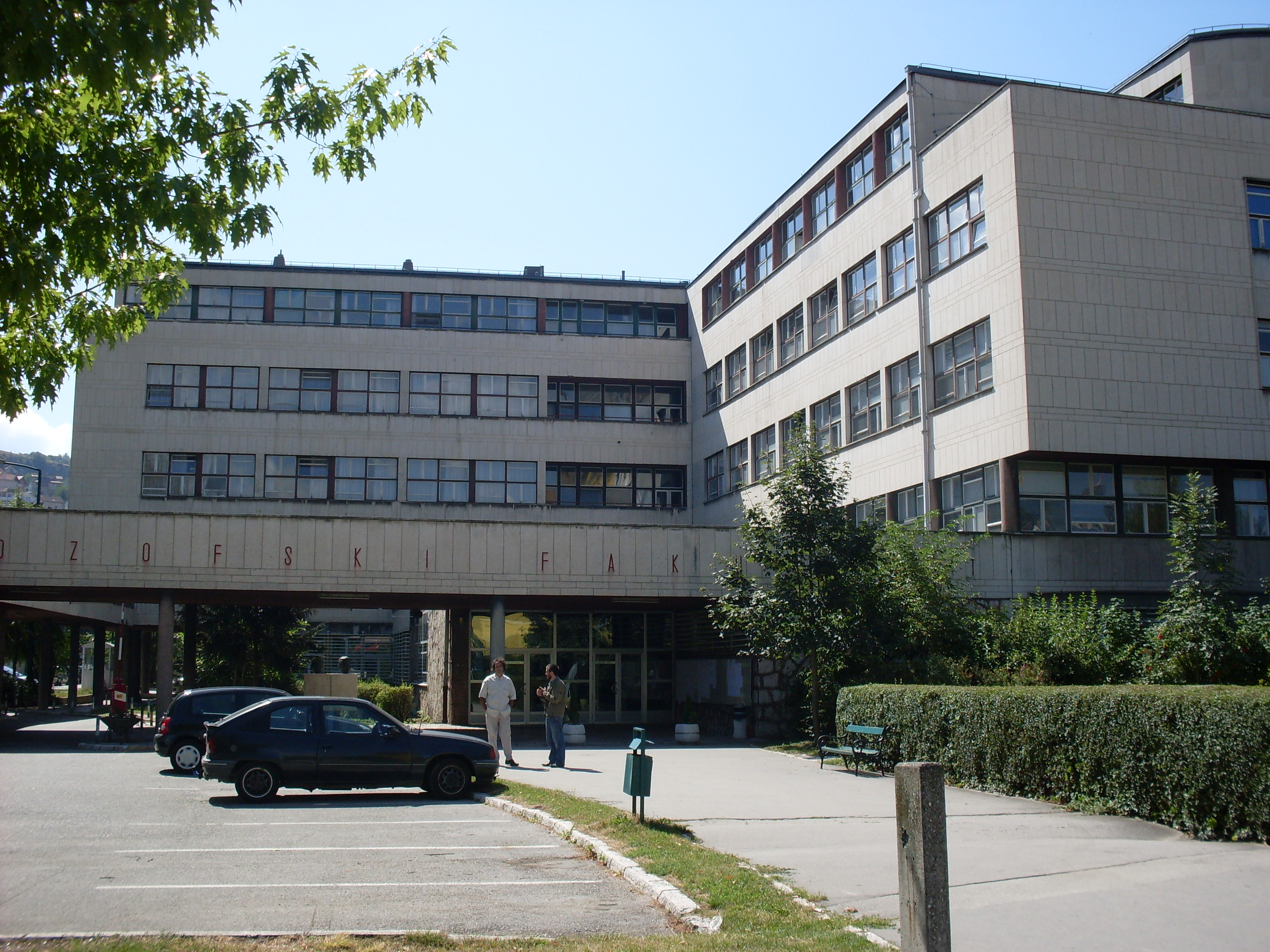
Faculty of Philosophy in Sarajevo by Juraj Neidhardt (1955–1959)

Government and Parliament buildings, Sarajevo, by Juraj Neidhardt

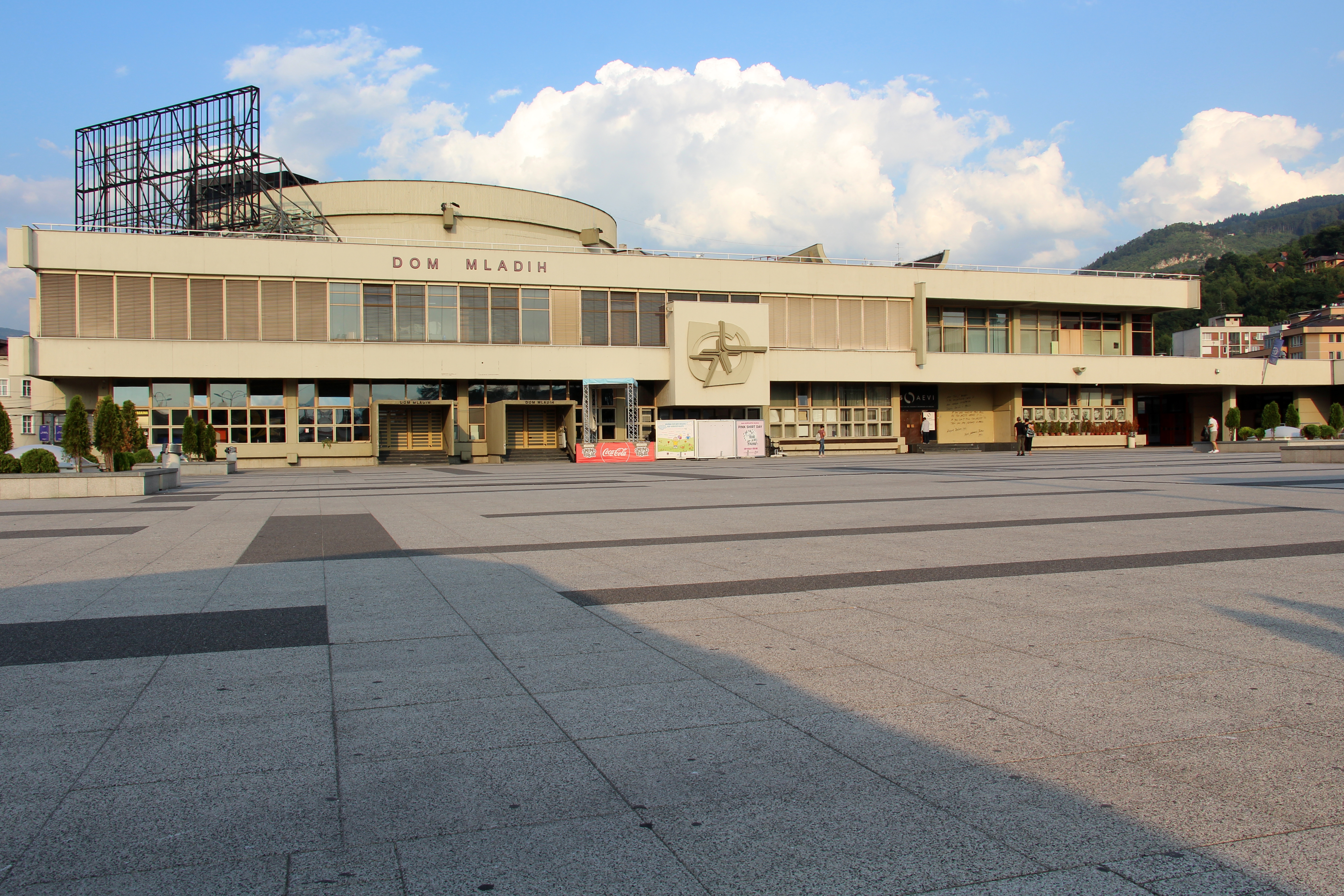
Dom Mladih Skenderija (1969)
Critical regionalist architecture
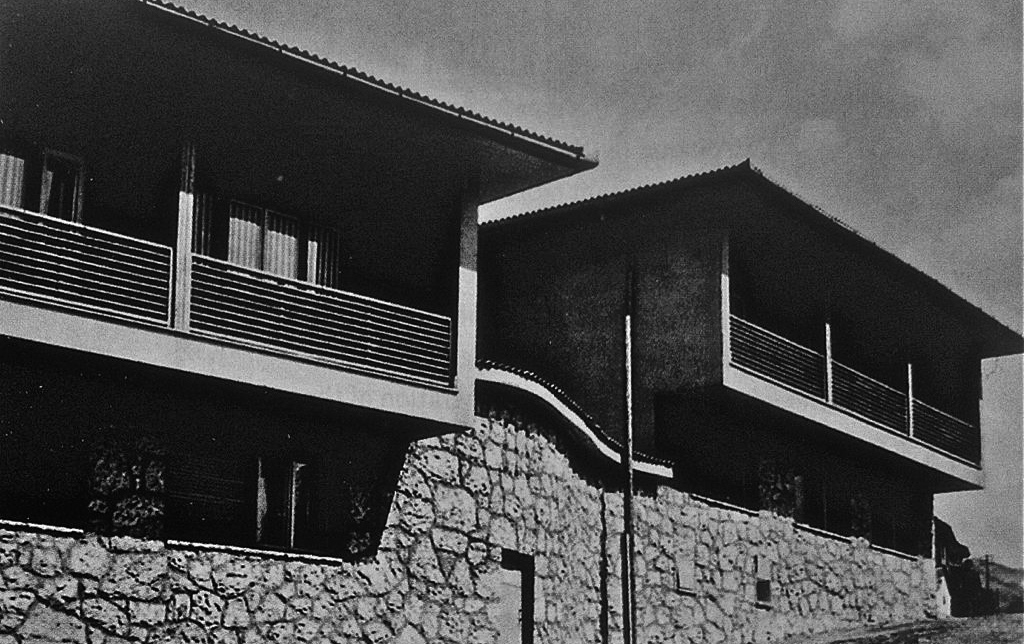
Housing complex in Džidžikovac (Andrija Čičin-Šain, 1953) influenced by traditional Bosnian loggias and doksa

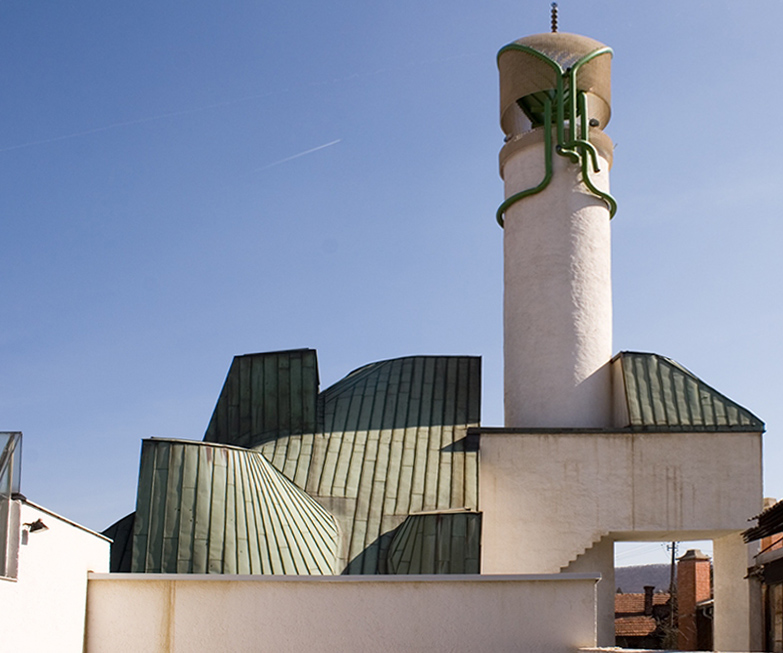
Šerefudin's White Mosque in Visoko (Zlatko Ugljen, 1980) references traditional Bosnian mosque architecture
Brutalist architecture
Radio and TV building, Sarajevo

Elektroprivreda building (Ivan Štraus, 1978)

Papagajka, Sarajevo (Mladen Gvozden, 1982)

== War-time destruction and post-war reconstruction ==
The Avaz Twist Tower is the headquarters of the Sarajevo newspaper Dnevni avaz

During the Bosnian War from 1992–1995, over 2,000 civil and religious buildings of historical value were destroyed. Among those were the Ferhadija mosque of Banja Luka (built in 1578) and the Stari Most in Mostar (built in 1566), both destroyed in 1993. They have been rebuilt true to the original techniques and styles.

In the years following the Bosnian War, there has been a construction boom in Sarajevo. It is among the cities with the most construction in South-East Europe. The UNIS Twin Towers, designed by architect Ivan Straus, were almost totally destroyed in the war, but have been renovated completely. In the Hrasno residential area, the Bosnian company Bosmal has constructed the "Bosmal City Center", one of the tallest twin towers in the Balkans at 120 meters each.

The new owners of the Holiday Inn Hotel in Sarajevo, also designed by architect Ivan Straus, announced that as of 2005 they will start construction on a new 22-story tower. The so-called 'intelligent' tower is expected to cost about 50 million euros.

The Unis Twin Towers have been renovated completely. On the site of the former Oslobodjenje Towers, the Avaz towers have now been constructed as new headquarters for Avaz, the popular Bosnian newspaper company. It is located in Marijin Dvor, Sarajevo's business district which has recently been totally renovated with the plans for the Unitic 3 and Grand Media Center. The new tower went under construction in 2006 and was completed in 2008. The Avaz Twist Tower holds the record for being the Balkan's tallest tower. It is made up of a twisting glass facade and is 142 meters tall with a 30-meter antenna reaching a total height of 172 meters.

Most of the Olympic venues were destroyed but reconstruction had not yet taken place as of 2001.

The Bosnian Parliament building (from architect Juraj Neidhart) is under re-construction, and the Museum of Bosnia and Herzegovina in Sarajevo's Marin Dvor area is totally renovated.

In Sarajevo's Ilidža suburb many construction projects which could be considered large by even EU standards have been started. Examples include a project to build a cable car to connect to the nearby mountains Igman and Bjelašnica; a sport complex with swimming pools worth 30 million euro; and the 'Gardens of Riverina' - city within the city which will cost more than 1 billion euro over a ten-year period.

Recently, one section of the future European motorway corridor 5C was constructed and opened for traffic near Sarajevo. Soon the Federal government will start construction on a new 40 km long motorway section from Sarajevo to Zenica. The construction of the whole 330 km of 5C was planned to be started in spring 2006, and worth approximately 3 billion euros.

Bjelašnica and Igman Olympic Mountains are under plans to be privatized and reconstructed.

Contemporary architecture
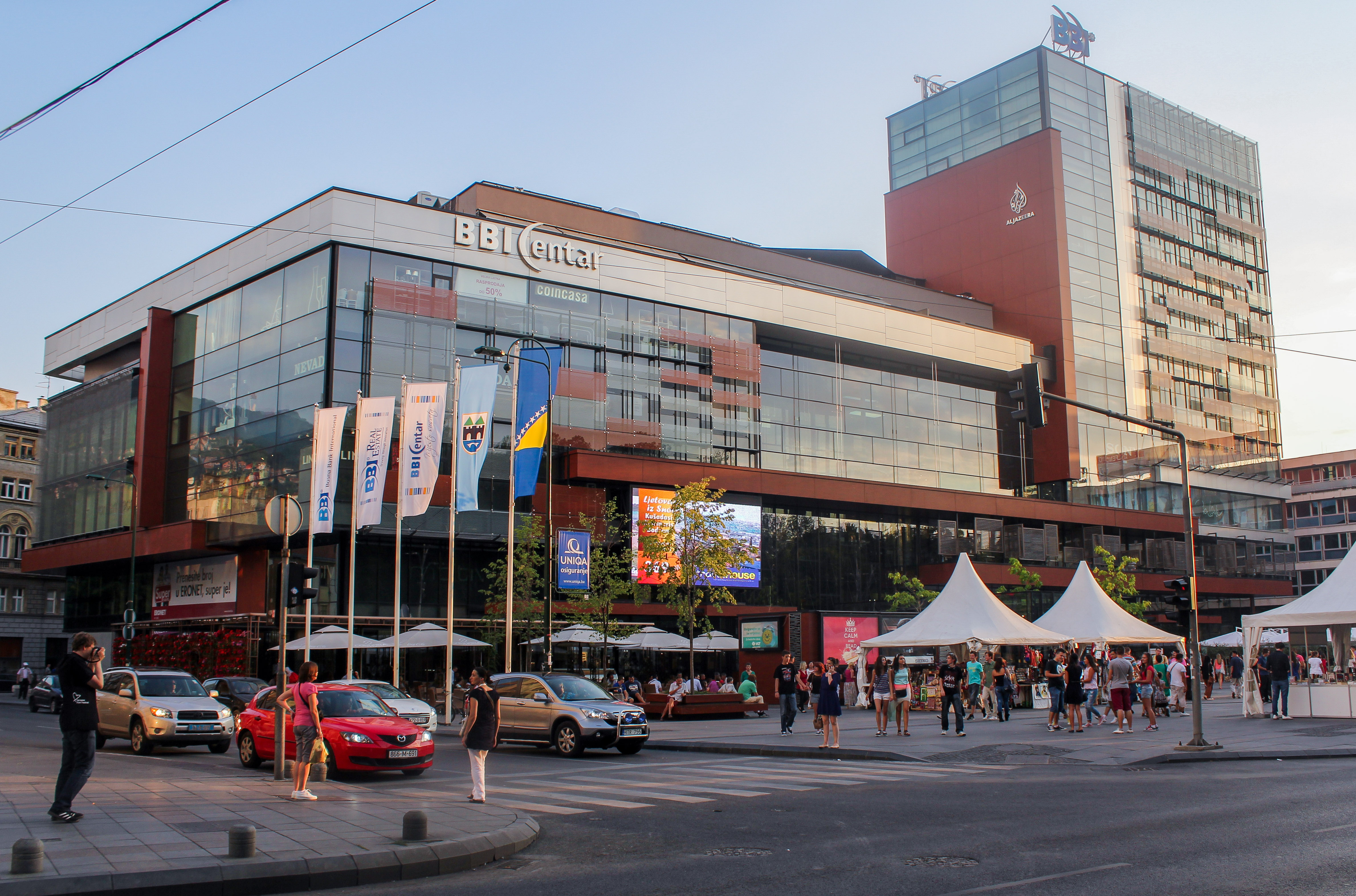
ARIA shopping and business centre in Sarajevo, by Sead Gološ

Bosmal City Center in Sarajevo, by Sead Gološ

Sarajevo City Center (SCC), by Sead Gološ

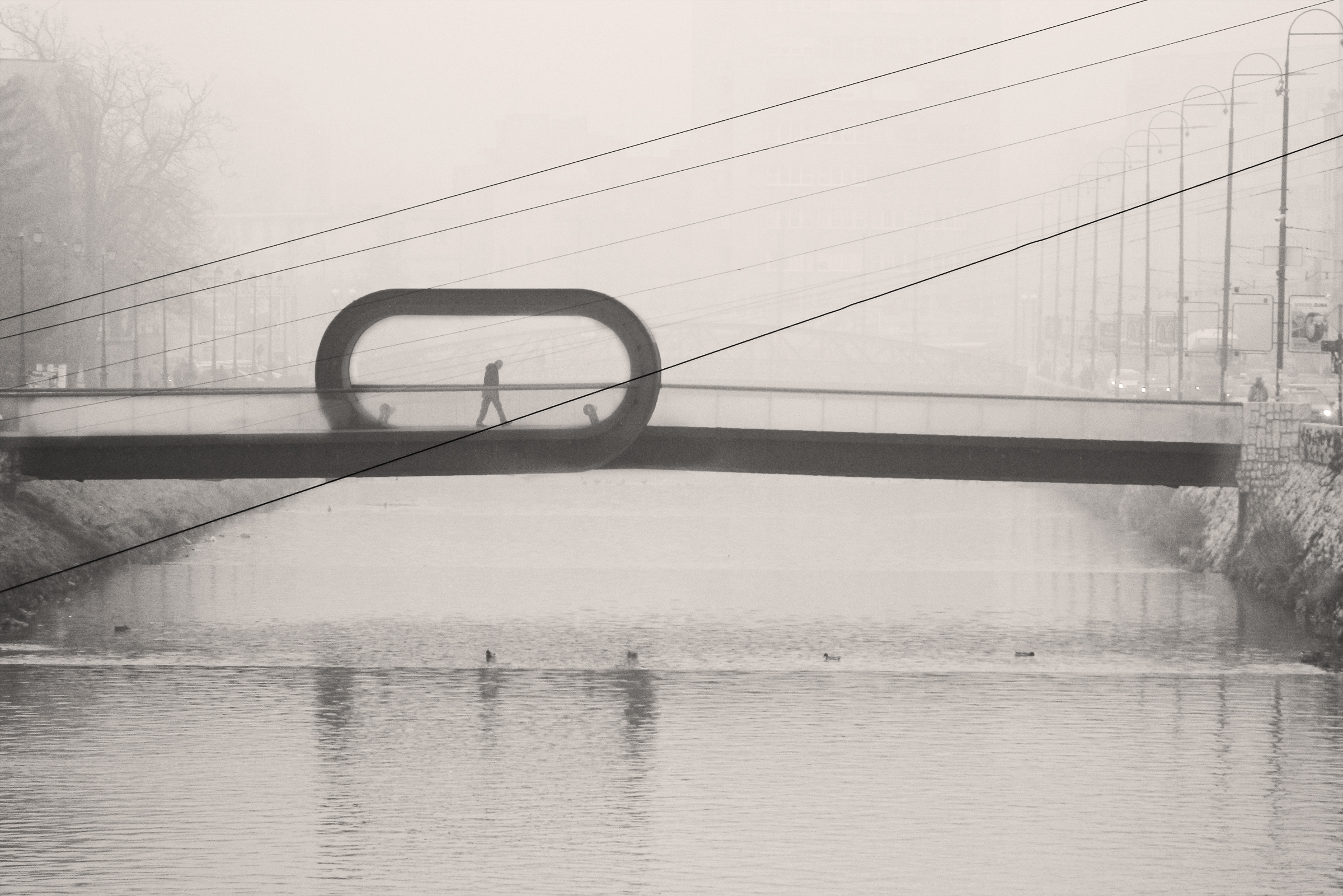
Festina lente foot bridge, by Adnan Alagić, Amila Hrustić and Bojana Kanlić

=== Reconstruction and preservation doctrine ===
Cultural preservation is under way in Bosnia and Herzegovina which can be seen with the most recent reconstruction of Stari Most in Mostar and many other structures of cultural and historical significance which were damaged or destroyed in the recent war. Many other projects, unfortunately, are still stifled by political disputes and lack of funds, due largely to corruption.

The doctrine that is generally followed in preservation was summarized by Italo C. Angle:

# The preservation of the city image, which includes preservation of specificity created by the overall relations between the natural and the constructed, colors, scents, sounds, forms, movements, overlapping of historical specificities, and the like;

1. The preservation of the city form, conducted through preservation of the built values of individual buildings and wholes;
2. and the preservation of the city structure, conducted through the preservation of the urban pattern and preservation of the specific distribution of meanings in the city.

== See also ==
- List of National Monuments of Bosnia and Herzegovina
- List of World Heritage Sites in Bosnia and Herzegovina
- List of Museums in Bosnia and Herzegovina
- List of tallest buildings in Bosnia and Herzegovina
- Sites of interest in Sarajevo
- Architecture of Yugoslavia

== Bibliography ==
- Grabrijan, Dušan; Neidhardt, Juraj (1957). Arhitektura Bosne i put u suvremeno [Architecture of Bosnia and the way [towards] modernity] (in Serbo-Croatian). Državna založba Slovenije.
- Alić, Dijana; Gusheh, Maryam (1999). "Reconciling National Narratives in Socialist Bosnia and Herzegovina: The Baščaršija Project, 1948-1953". Journal of the Society of Architectural Historians. 58 (1): 6–25. doi:10.2307/991434. ISSN 0037-9808. JSTOR 991434.
- Amir Pašić, Islamic Architecture in Bosnia (1994)
- Nedžad Kurto, Sarajevo 1462-1992 (1997),
- Kurto, Nedžad - "Arhitektura Bosne i Hercegovine - Razvoj Bosanskog Stila (Architecture of Bosnia and Herzegovina – Development of Bosnian Style)"
- Štraus, Ivan – "Architecture of Bosnia and Herzegovina 1945-1995"
- Ravlić, Aleksandar – "Banjalučka Ferhadija – Ljepotica koju su ubili (Ferhadija of Banja Luka – A Destroyed Beauty)"
- Hadžimuhamedović, Amra - "Transnational Meaning of the Bosnia-Herzegovinian Architectural Heritage and its Post-War Reconstruction - Integrality of the Bosnia-Herzegovinian Architectural Heritage System"
- Alić, Dijana - "From Ottoman house to Bosnian style: Neidhardt's design for workers' housing in Bosnia and Herzegovina (1939 to 1942)"
- Pozderac, Damir - "Eco-cultural Approach Towards Sustainable Architecture and Urban Planning in Bosnia and Herzegovina - Case study on Integral Architecture"
