= Architecture of Yugoslavia =

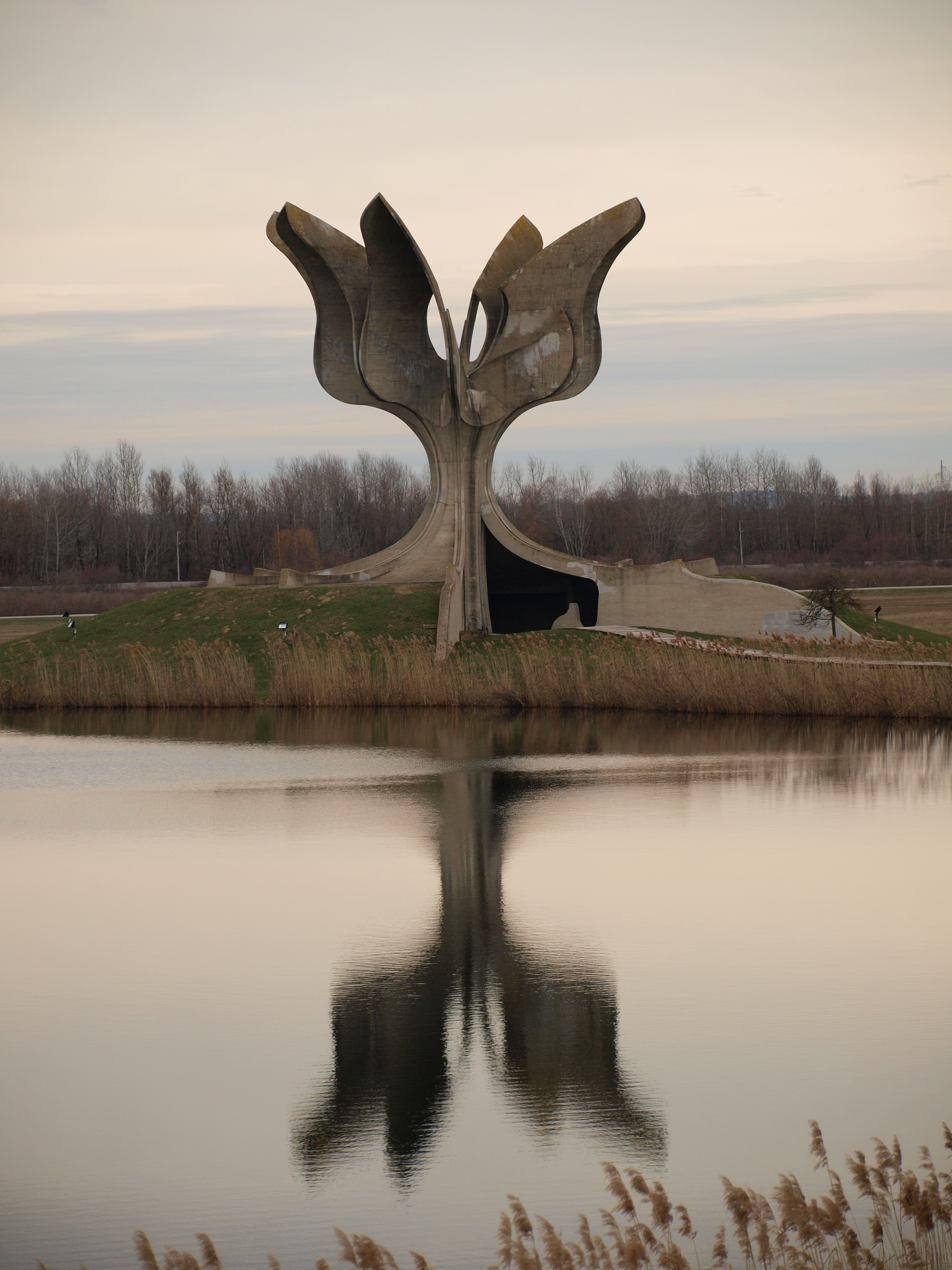
Stone Flower (1966) by Bogdan Bogdanović in Jasenovac

The architecture of Yugoslavia was characterized by emerging, unique, and often differing national and regional narratives. As a communist state remaining free from the Iron Curtain and the Eastern Bloc, Yugoslavia adopted a hybrid identity that combined the architectural, cultural, and political leanings of both Western liberal democracy and Soviet communism.

== Interwar modernism ==
Yugoslav architecture emerged in the first decades of the 20th century before the establishment of the state; during this period a number of South Slavic creatives, enthused by the possibility of statehood, organized a series of art exhibitions in Serbia in the name of a shared Slavic identity. Following governmental centralization after the 1918 creation of the Kingdom of Yugoslavia, this initial bottom-up enthusiasm began to fade. Yugoslav architecture became more and more dictated by an increasingly concentrated national authority which sought to establish a unified state identity.

Beginning the 1920s, Yugoslav architects began to advocate for architectural modernism, viewing the style as the logical extension of progressive national narratives. The Group of Architects of the Modern Movement, an organization founded in 1928 by architects Branislav Đ Kojić, Milan Zloković, Jan Dubovy, and Dusan Babic pushed for the widespread adoption of modern architecture as the "national" style of Yugoslavia to transcended regional differences. Despite these shifts, differing relationships to the west made the adoption of modernism inconsistent in Yugoslavia WWII; while the westernmost republics of Croatia and Slovenia were familiar with Western influence and eager to adopt modernism, long-Ottoman Bosnia remained more resistant to do so. Of all Yugoslavian cities, Belgrade has highest concentration of modernist structures.

Interwar modernism in Yugoslavia
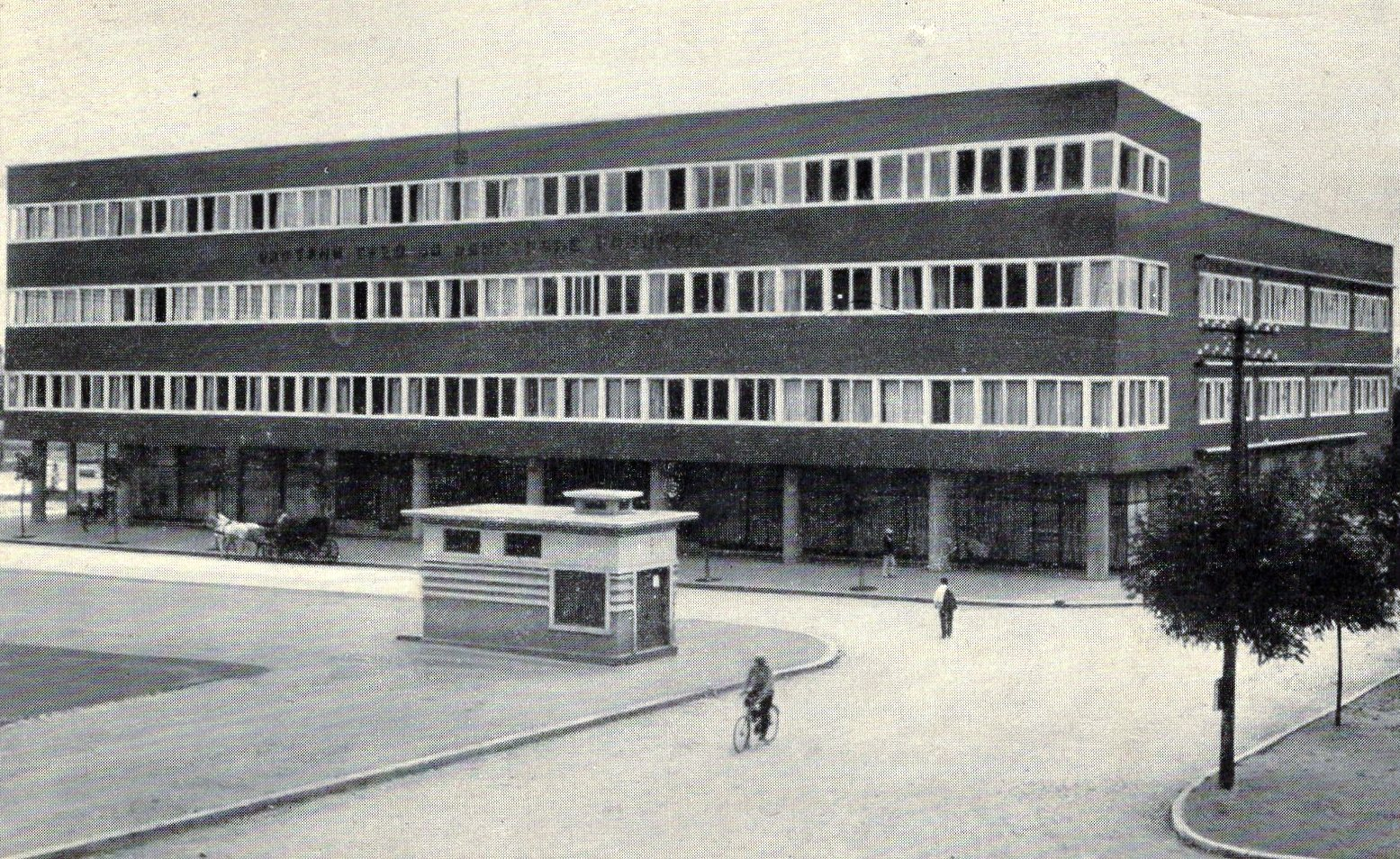
City Hospital (1930) designed by Drago Ebler in Skopje

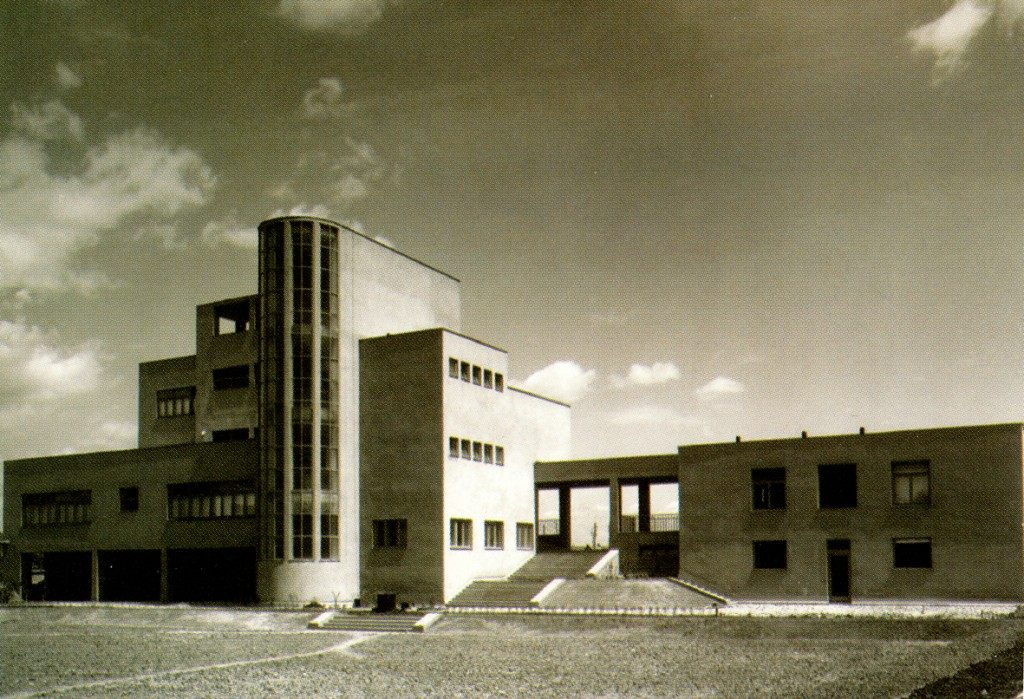
Modernist school (1930) designed by Ivan Zemljak in Zagreb

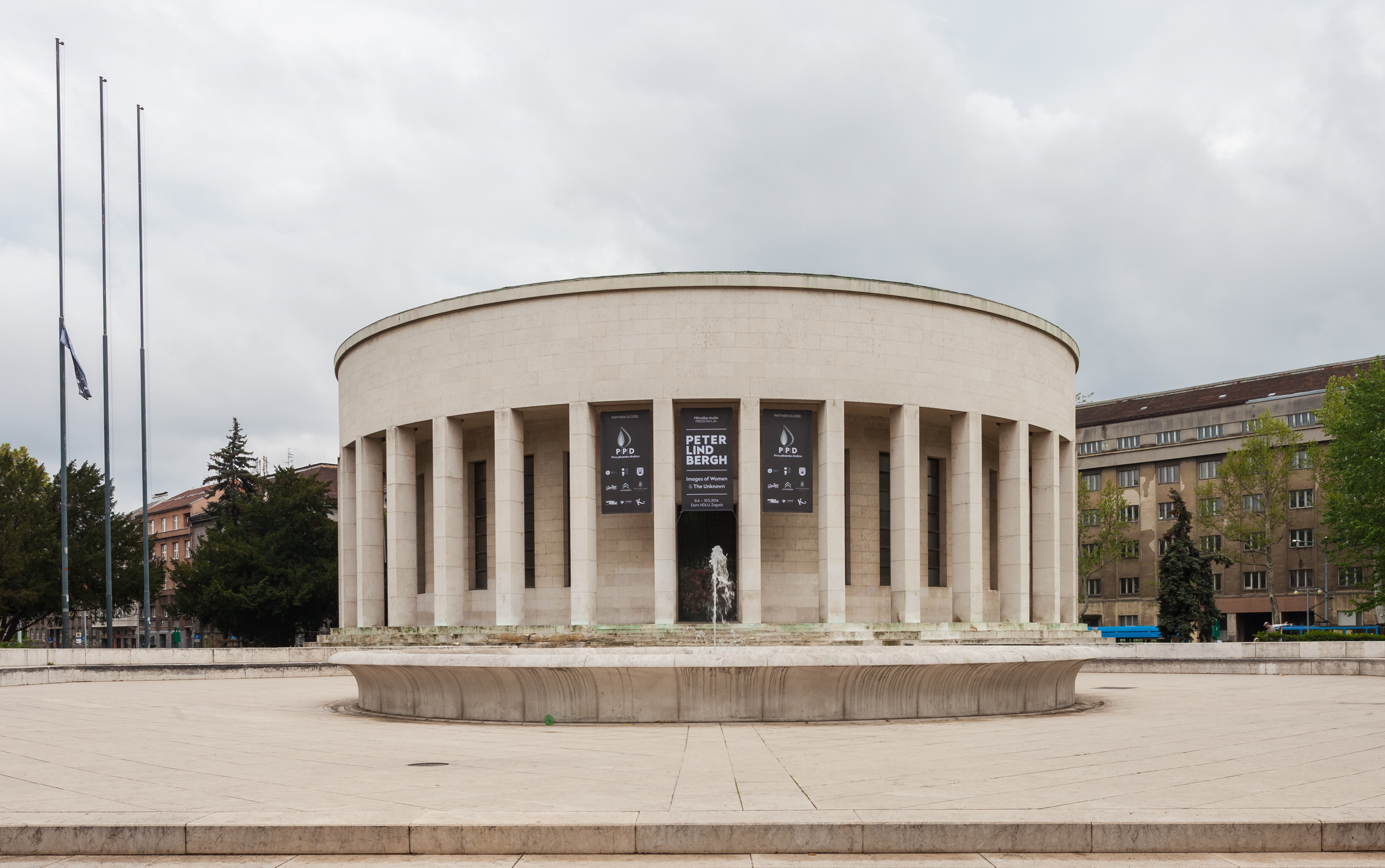
Meštrović Pavilion art gallery (1933) designed by Ivan Meštrović in Zagreb

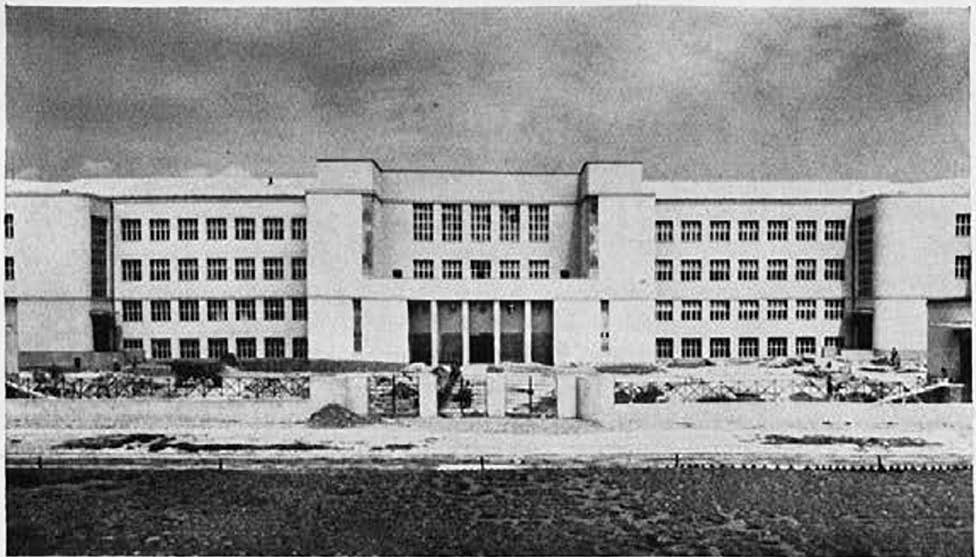
Križanićeva Street Gymnasium Building (1933) designed by Egon Steinmann in Zagreb

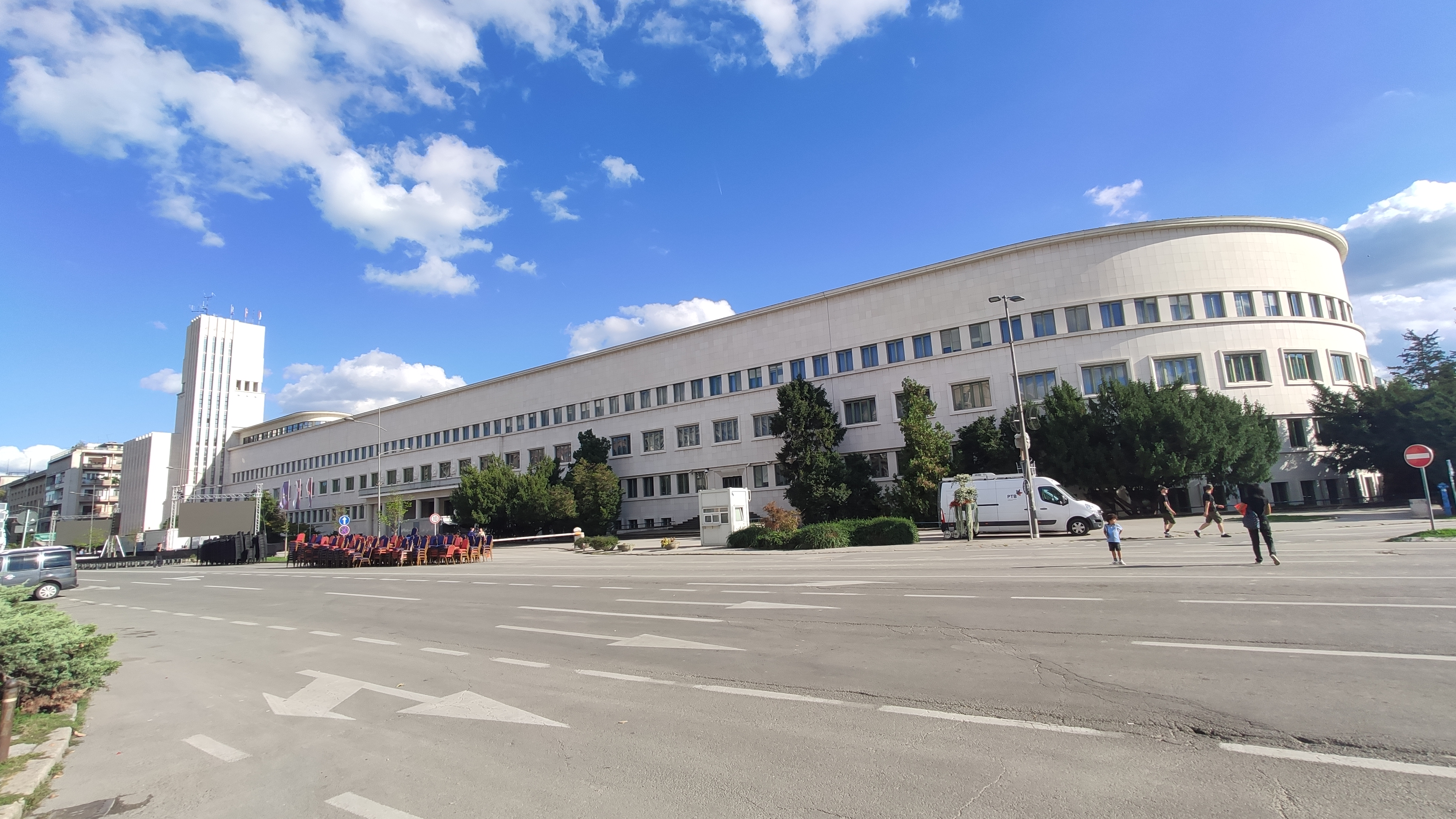
Danube Banovina Palace (1939) designed by Dragiša Brašovan in Novi Sad

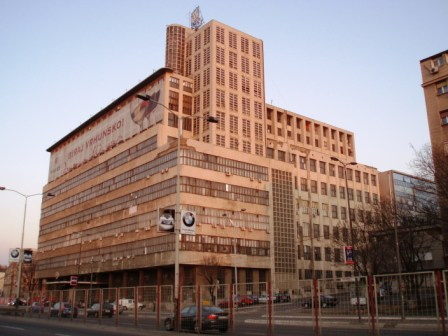
BIGZ building (1941) designed by Dragiša Brašovan in Belgrade

== Socialist realism (1945–48) ==
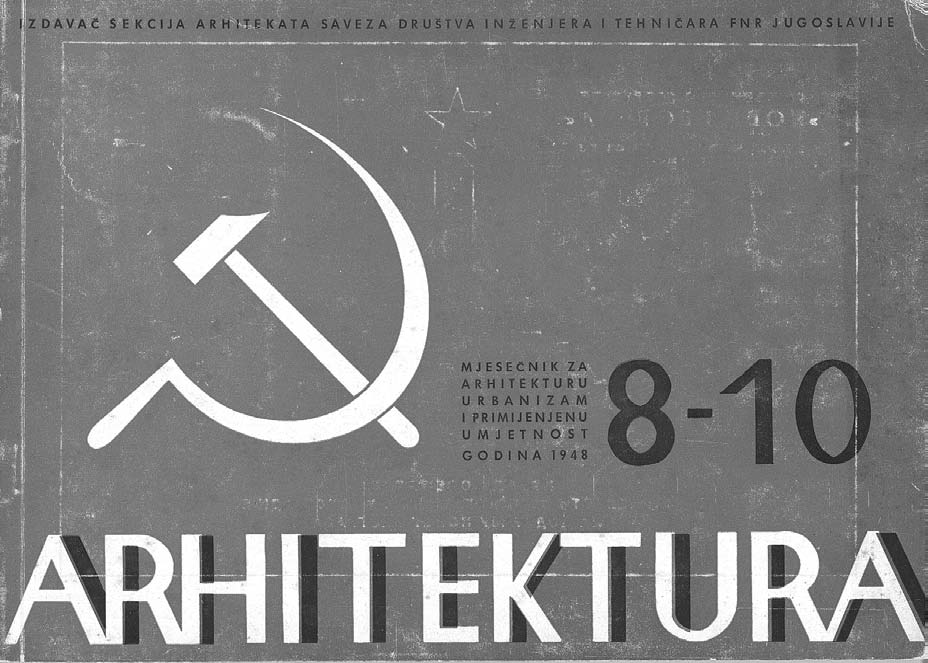
1948 cover of Zagreb-based architectural journal Arhitektura; socialist realism was the dominant style represented in the publication until 1949

Immediately following the Second World War, Yugoslavia's brief association with the Eastern Bloc ushered in a short period of socialist realism. Centralization within the communist model led to the abolishment of private architectural practices and the state control of the profession. During this period, the governing Communist Party condemned modernism as "bourgeois formalism," a move that caused friction among the nation's pre-war modernist architectural elite.

Socialist realist architecture in Yugoslavia
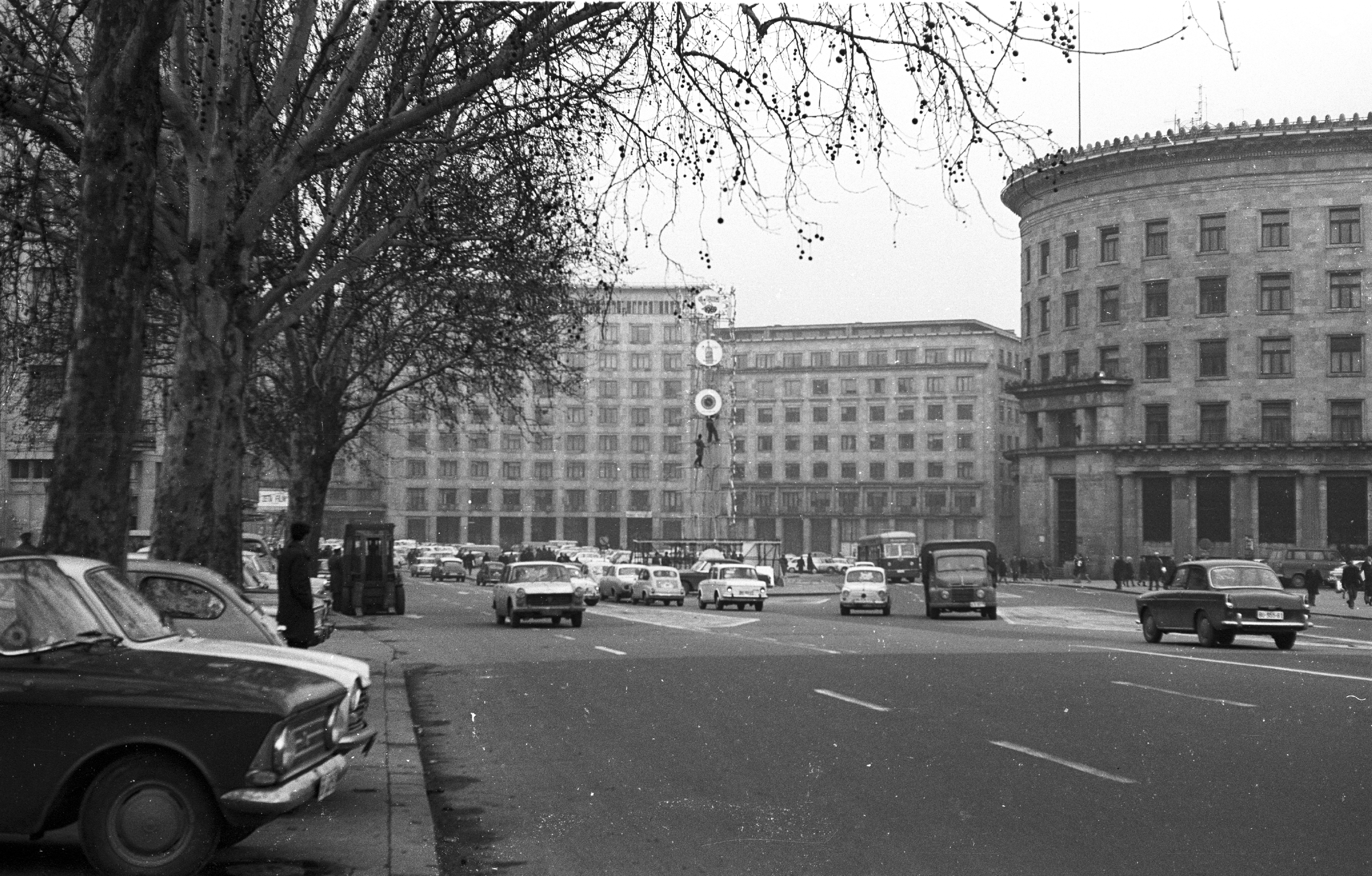
Dom Sindikata in Belgrade by Branko Petričić in 1947, in the socialist realist style

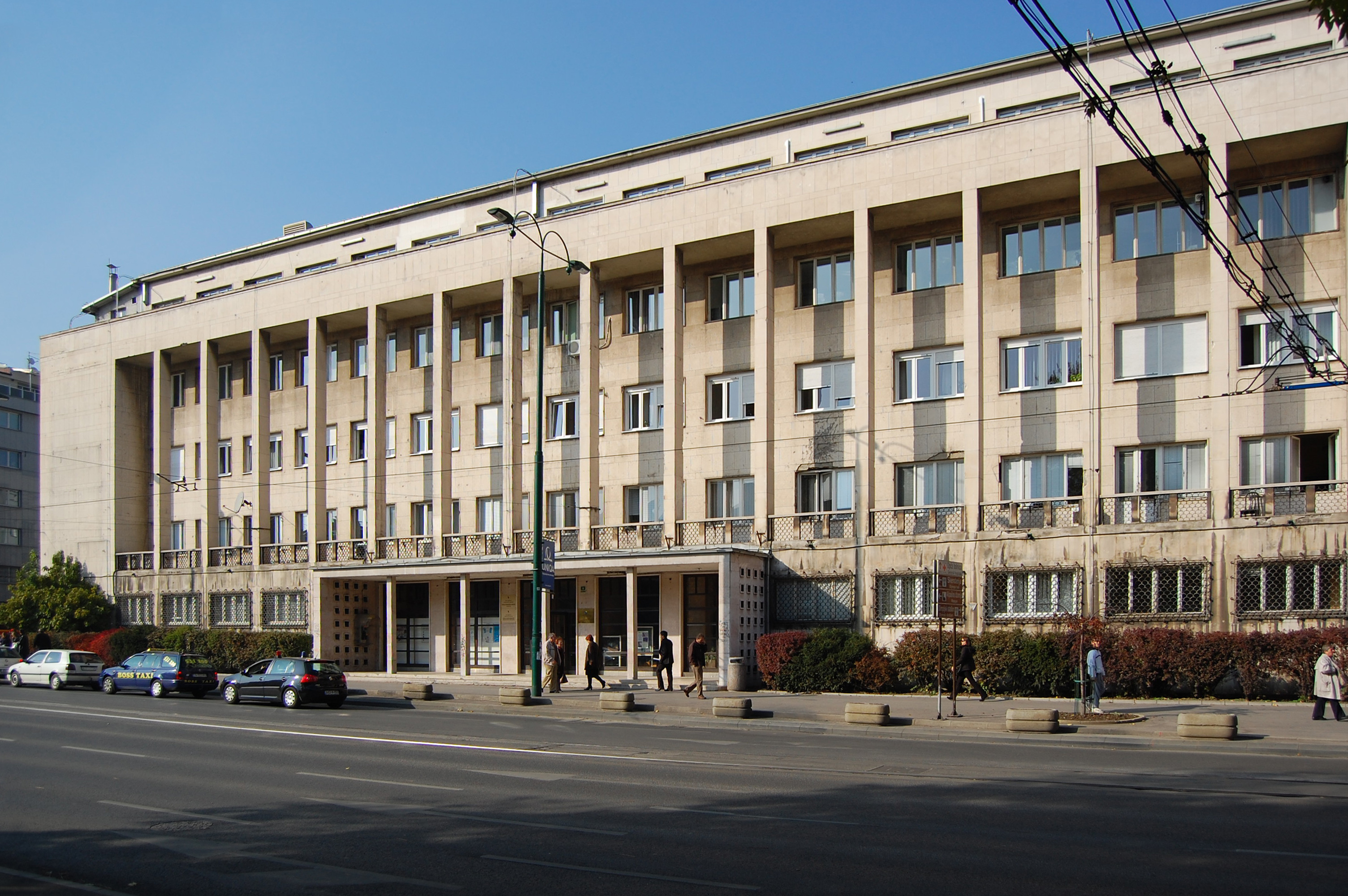
Public Health Institute (Higijenski zavod, 1950) by Tihomir Ivanović in Sarajevo

== Modernism (1948–92) ==
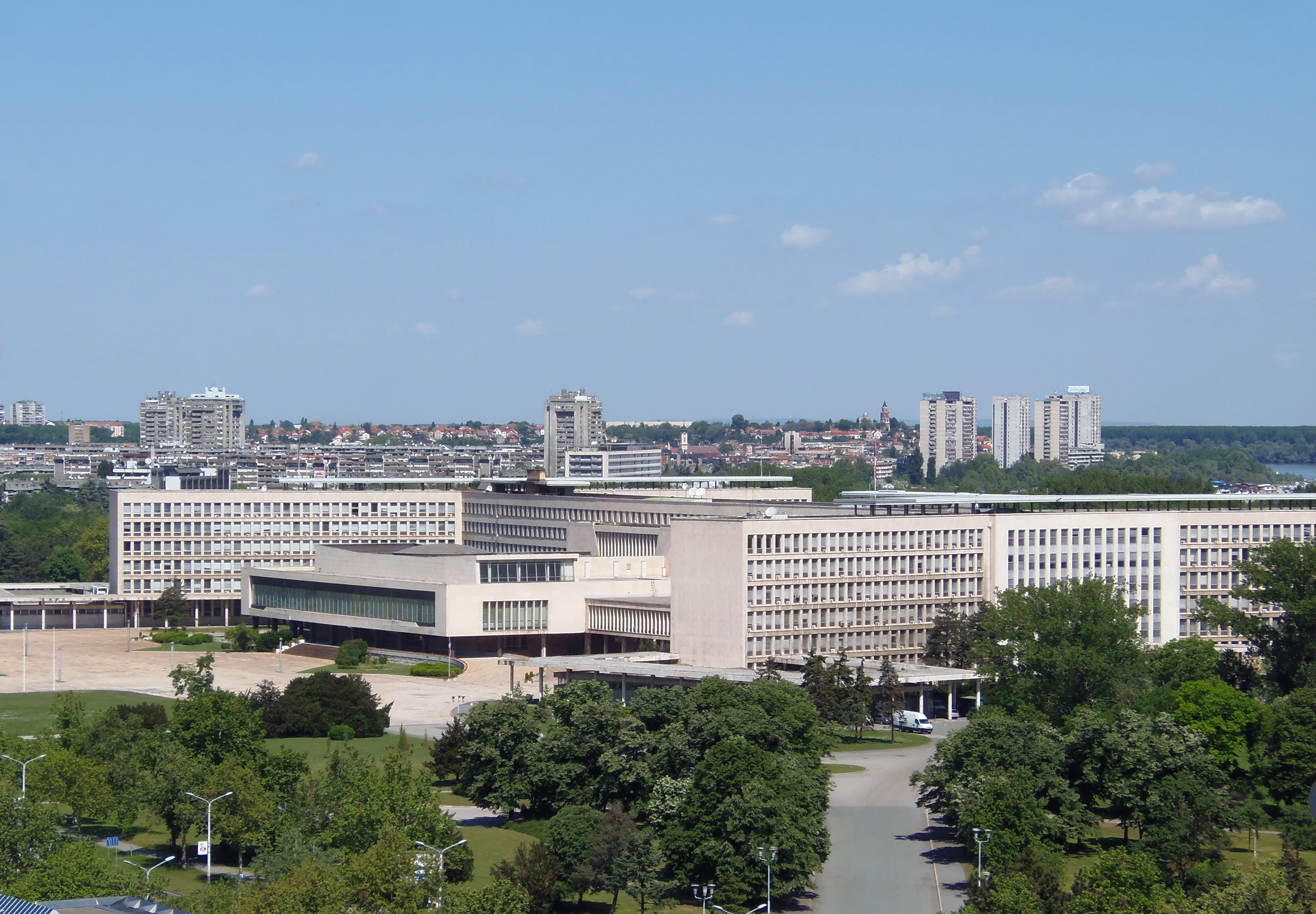
Palace of the Federation (1950) by Potočnjak and Janković, Belgrade

Socialist realist architecture in Yugoslavia came to an abrupt end with Josip Broz Tito's 1948 split with Stalin. In the following years the nation turned increasingly to the West, returning to the modernism that had characterized pre-war Yugoslav architecture. During this era, modernist architecture came to symbolize the nation's break from the USSR (a notion that later diminished with growing acceptability of modernism in the Eastern Bloc). The nation's postwar return to modernism is perhaps best exemplified in Vjenceslav Richter's widely acclaimed 1958 Yugoslavia Pavilion at Expo 58, the open and light nature of which contrasted the much heavier architecture of the Soviet Union.

=== Spomeniks ===
During this period, the Yugoslav break from Soviet socialist realism combined with efforts to commemorate World War II, which together led to the creation of an immense quantity of abstract sculptural war memorials, known today as spomenik.

Spomeniks of Yugoslavia
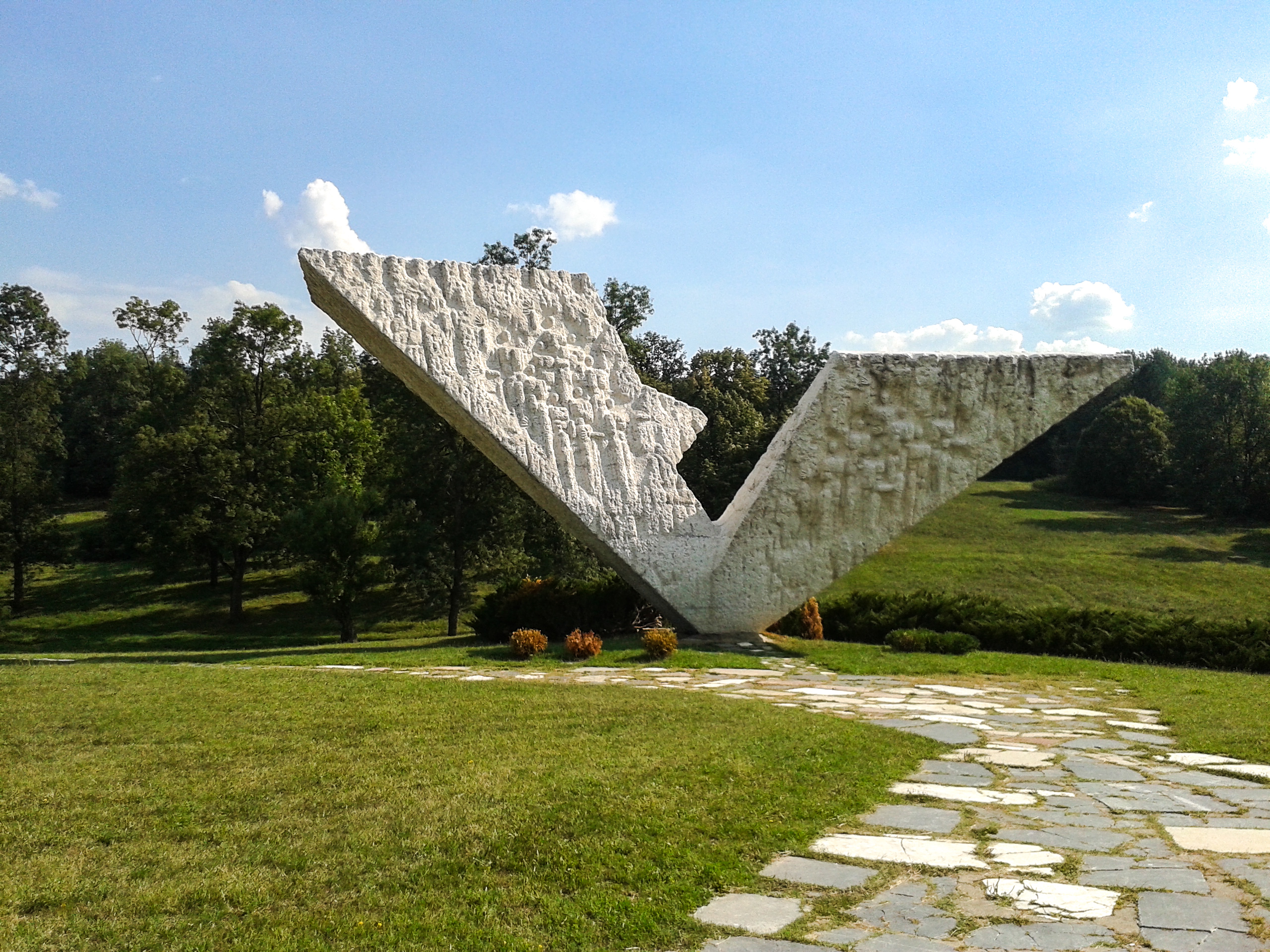
Šumarice Memorial Park (1953) designed by Miodrag Živković in Kragujevac

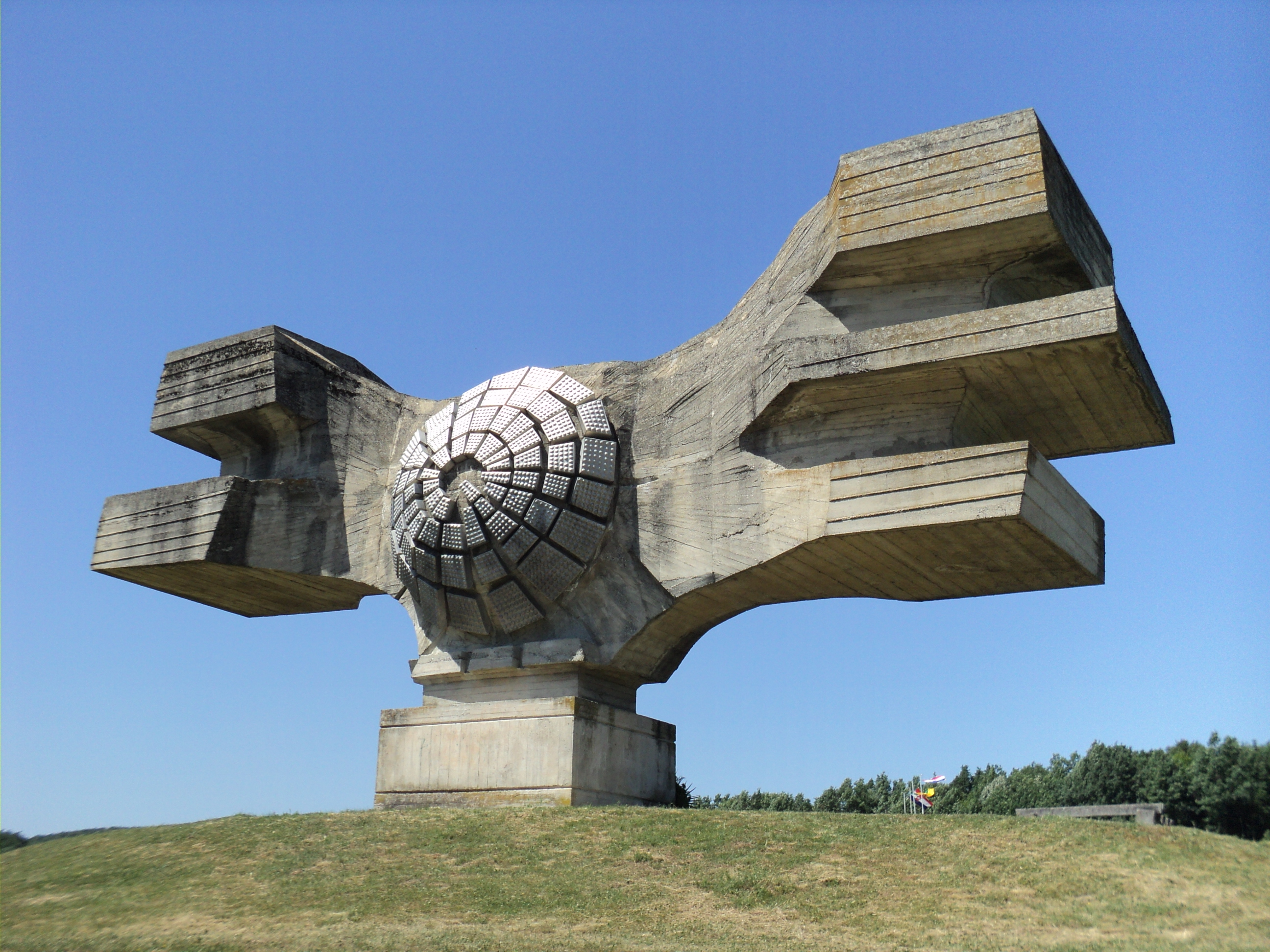
Monument to the Revolution of the people of Moslavina (1967) designed by Dušan Džamonja in Podgarić

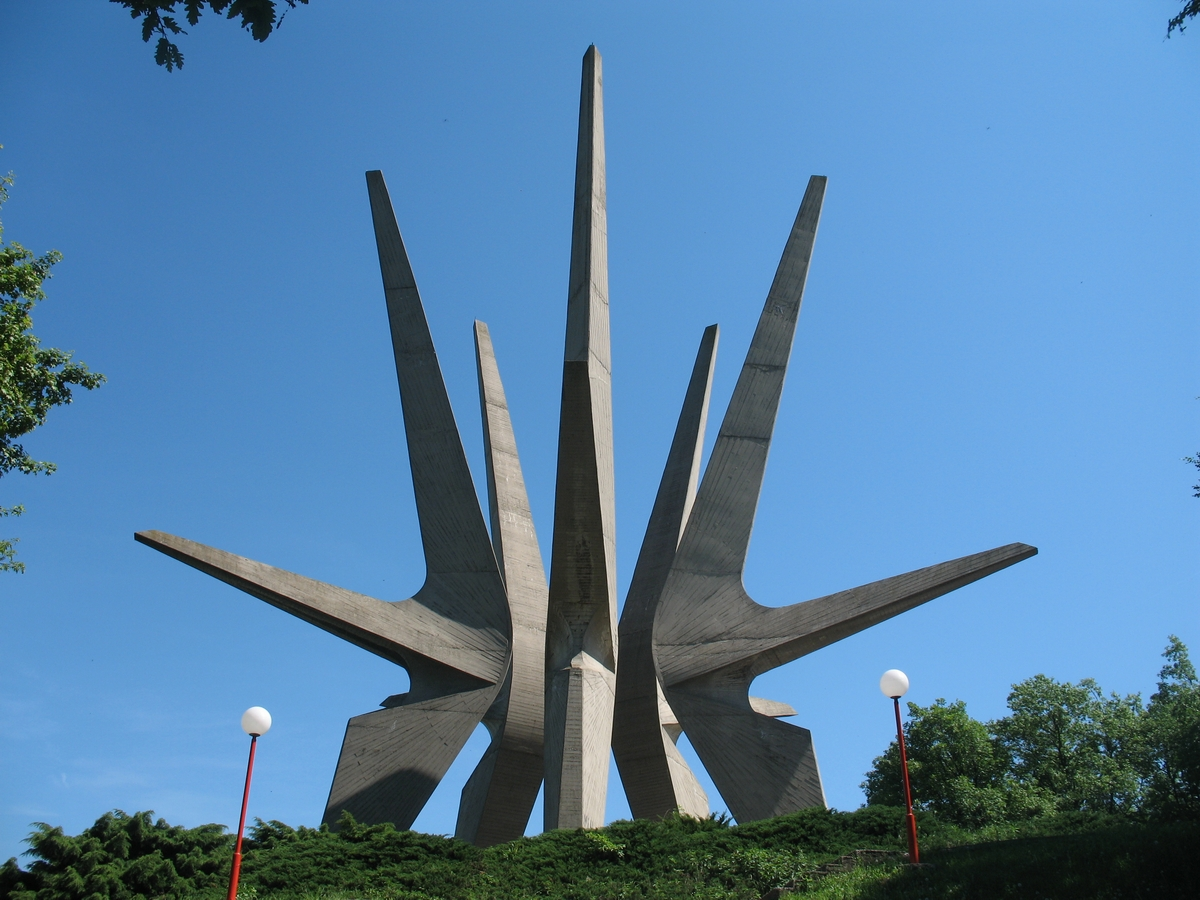
Monument to Kosmaj Partisan Detachment (1971) in Belgrade

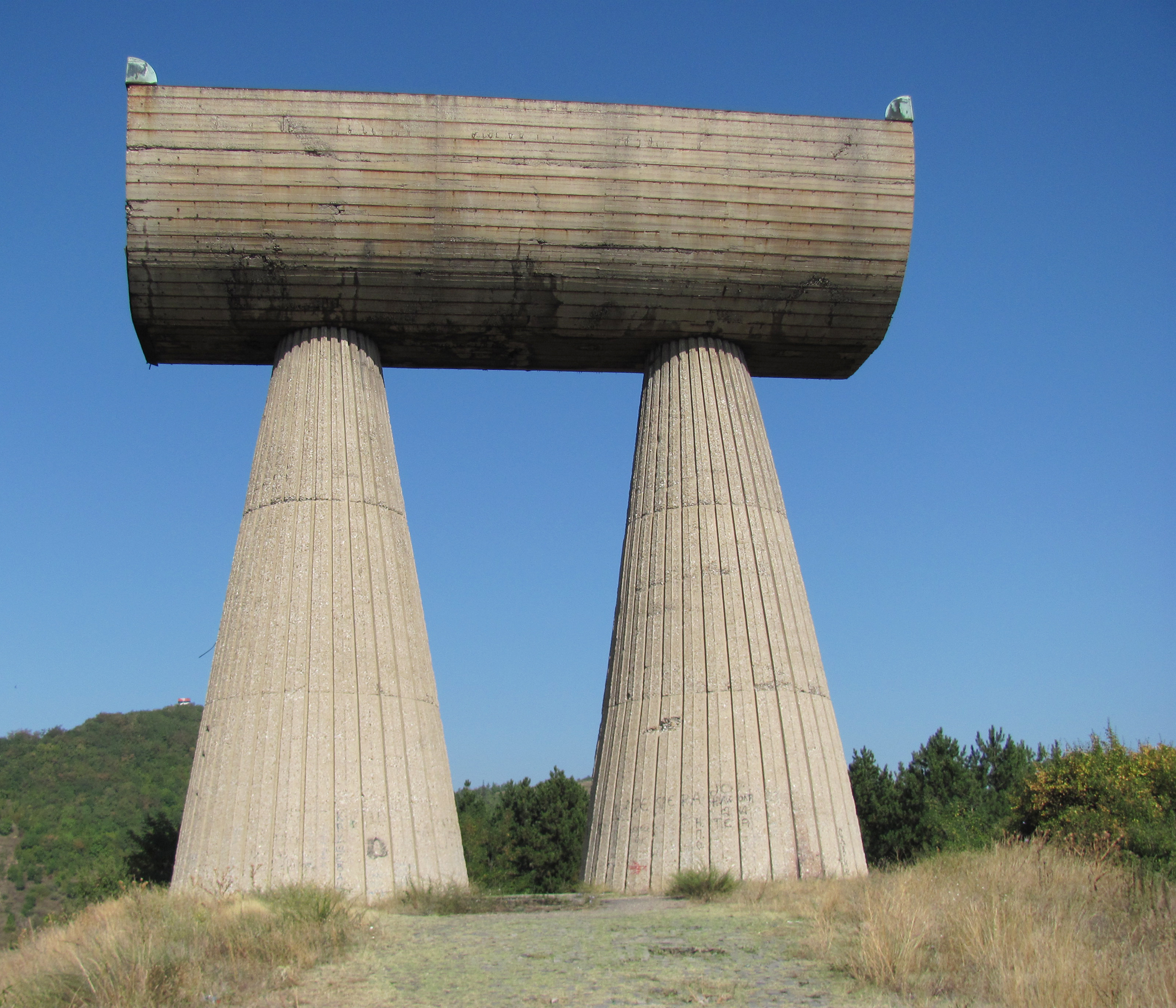
Miners' monument (1973) designed by Bogdan Bogdanović in Kosovska Mitrovica

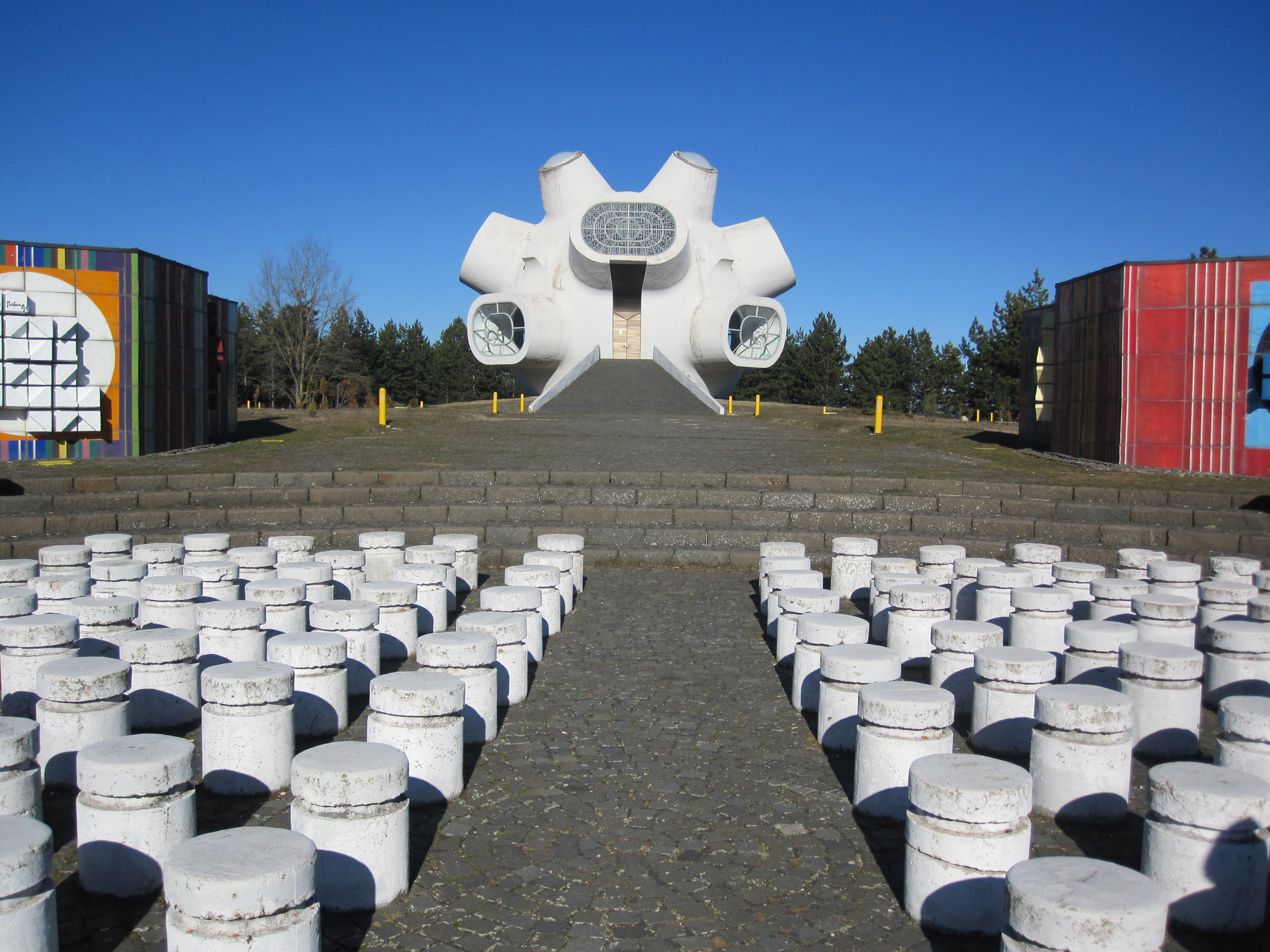
Makedonium (1974) designed by Jordan and Iskra Grabuloska in Kruševo

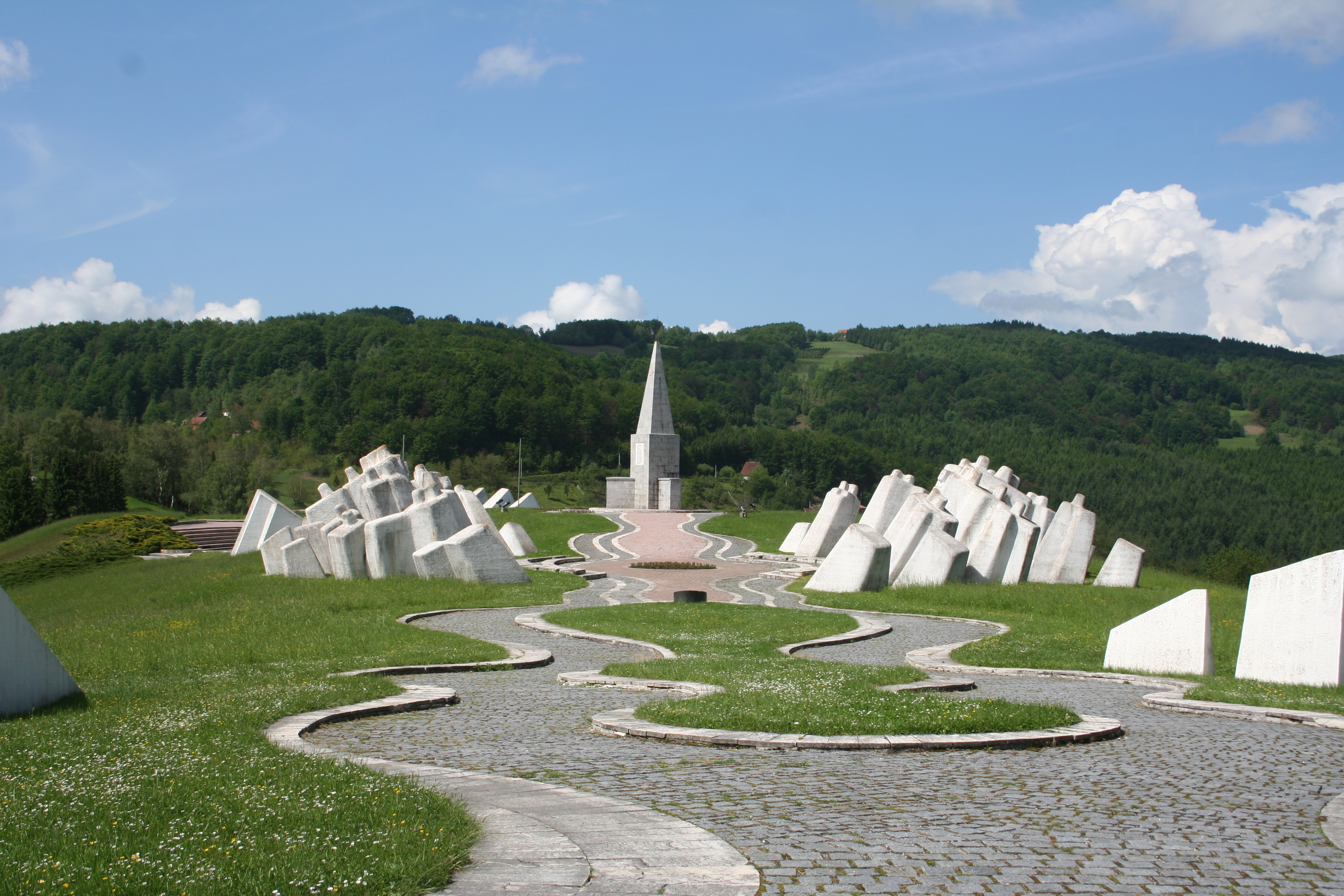
Memorial (1979) designed by Miodrag Živković and Aleksandar Đokić in Kadinjača

=== Brutalism ===
In the late 1950s and early 1960s Brutalism began to garner a following within Yugoslavia, particularly among younger architects, a trend possibly influenced by the 1959 disbandment of the Congrès Internationaux d'Architecture Moderne. Brutalism's growing influence in the nation was most prominently exemplified in reconstruction efforts of Skopje following a destructive 1963 earthquake. Japanese architect Kenzo Tange played a key role in pushing for Brutalism in the city, going so far as to propose a full redesign of Skopje in the style. The architecture of the city is compiled in Kenzo Tange's Masterplan of Skopje City 1963 with a collaboration led by the UNs teams of international architects.

Brutalism in Yugoslavia
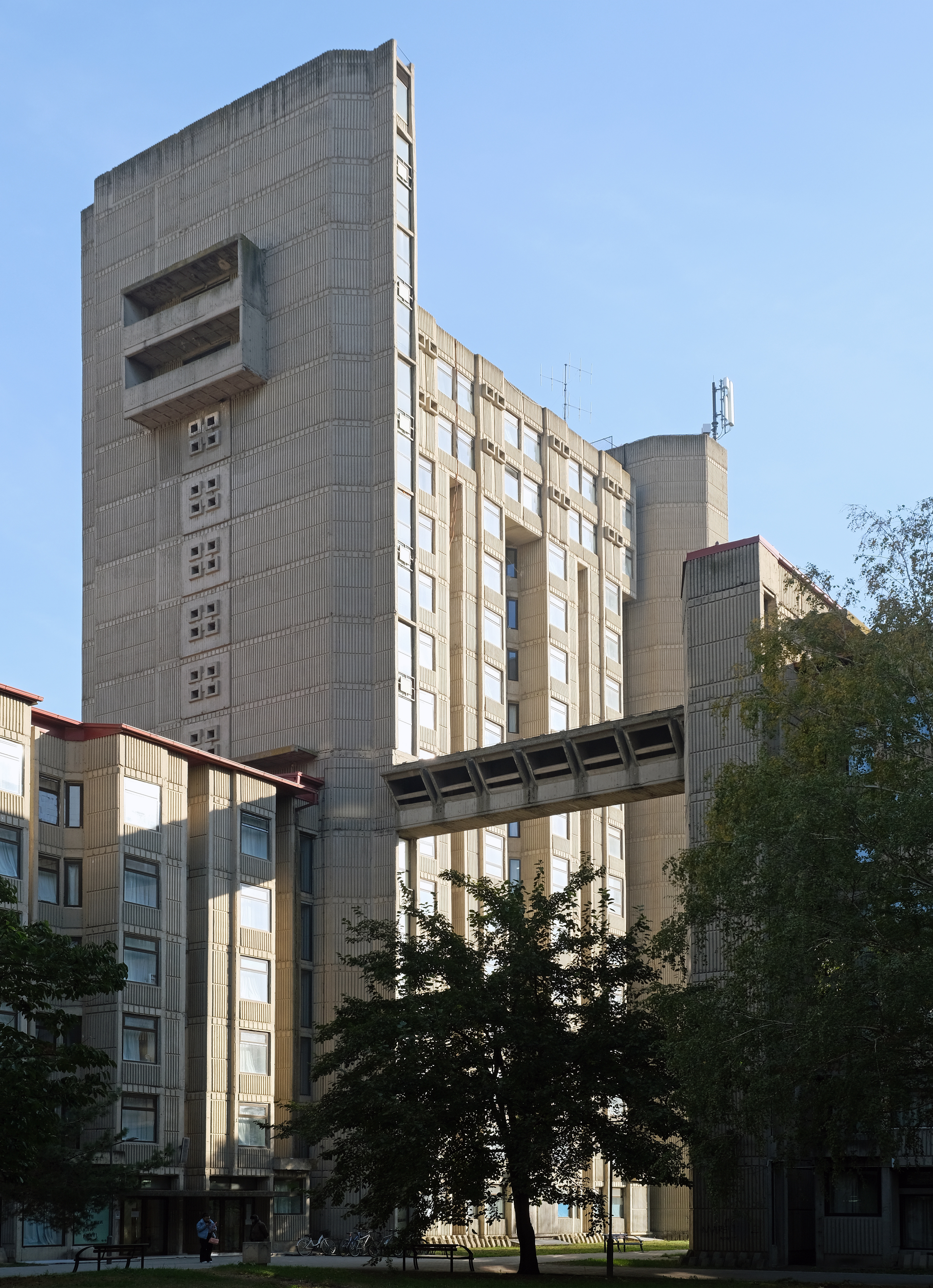
Student dormitory (1971) by Georgi Konstantinovski in Skopje

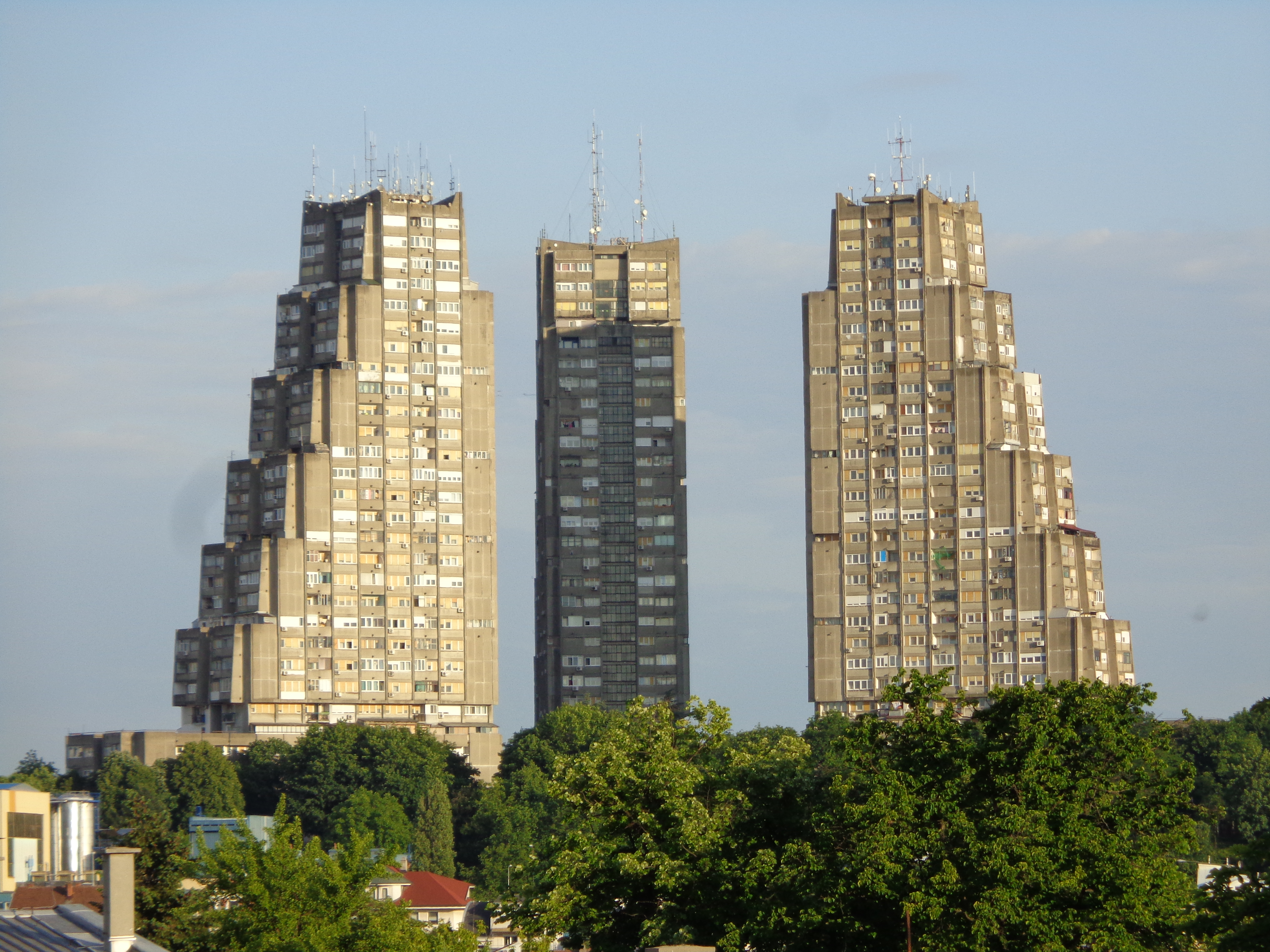
Eastern City Gate (1976) by Vera Ćirković in Belgrade

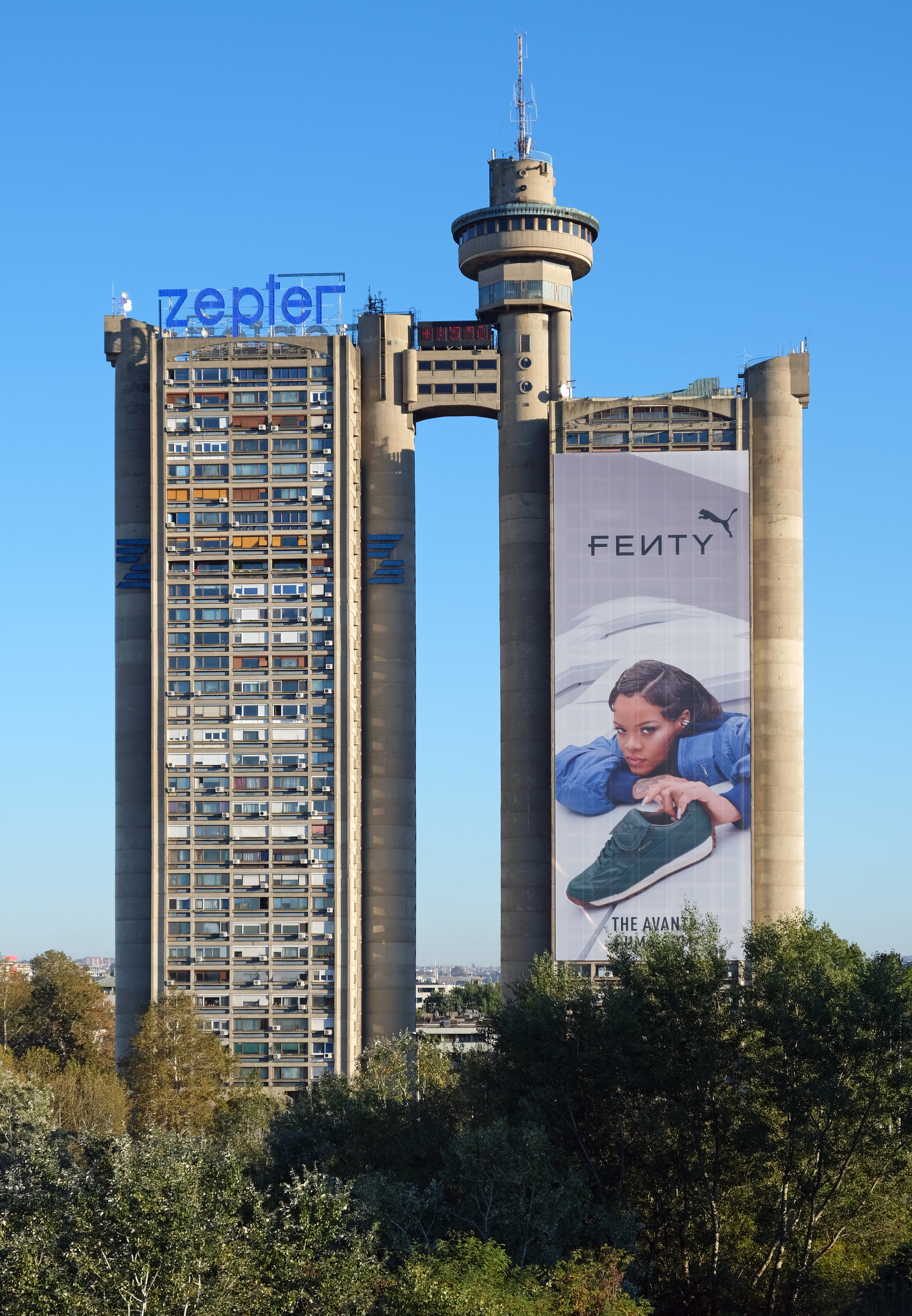
Western City Gate (1977) by Mihajlo Mitrović in Belgrade

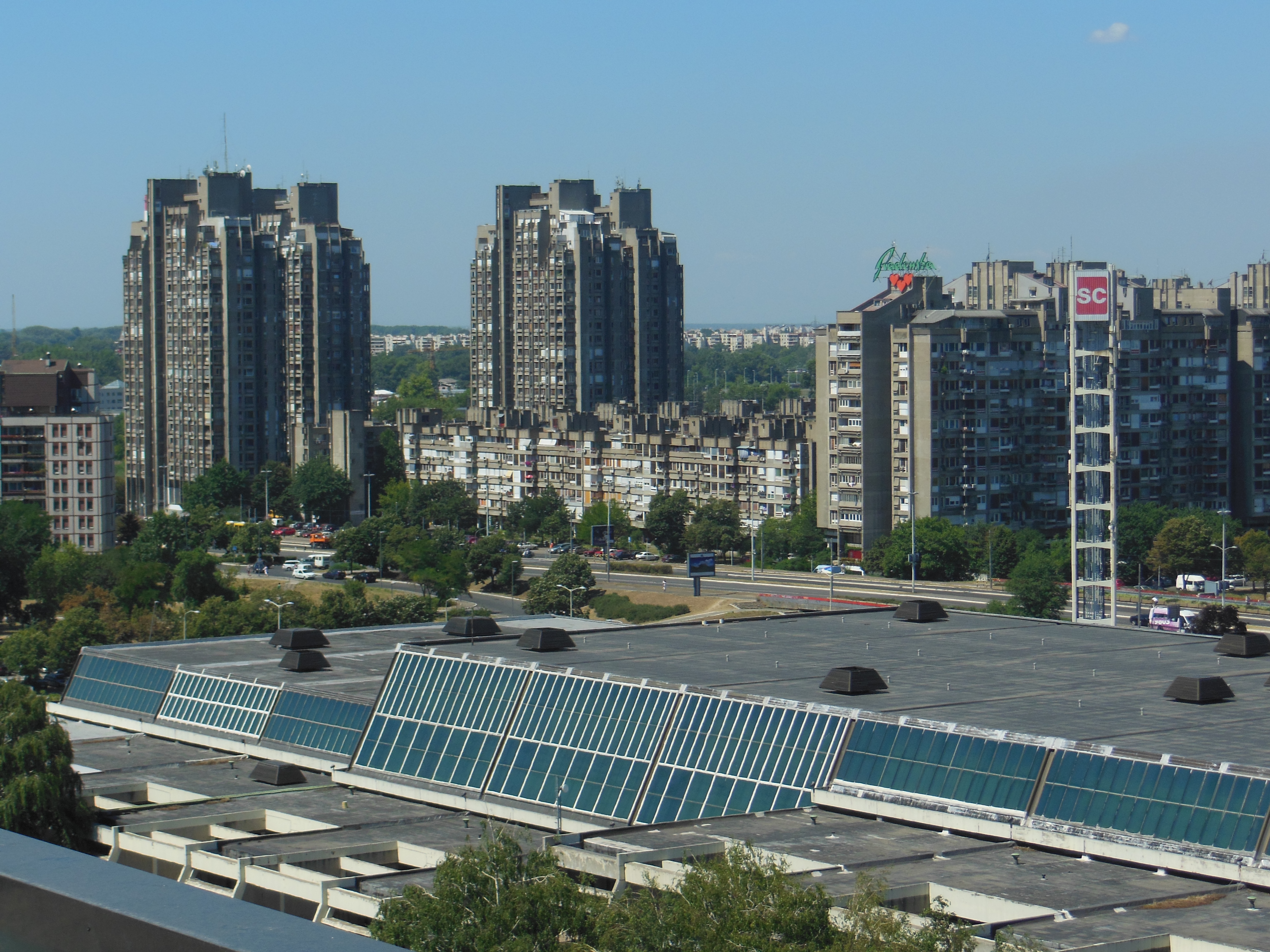
Sava Centar (1979) Stojan Maksimović in Belgrade

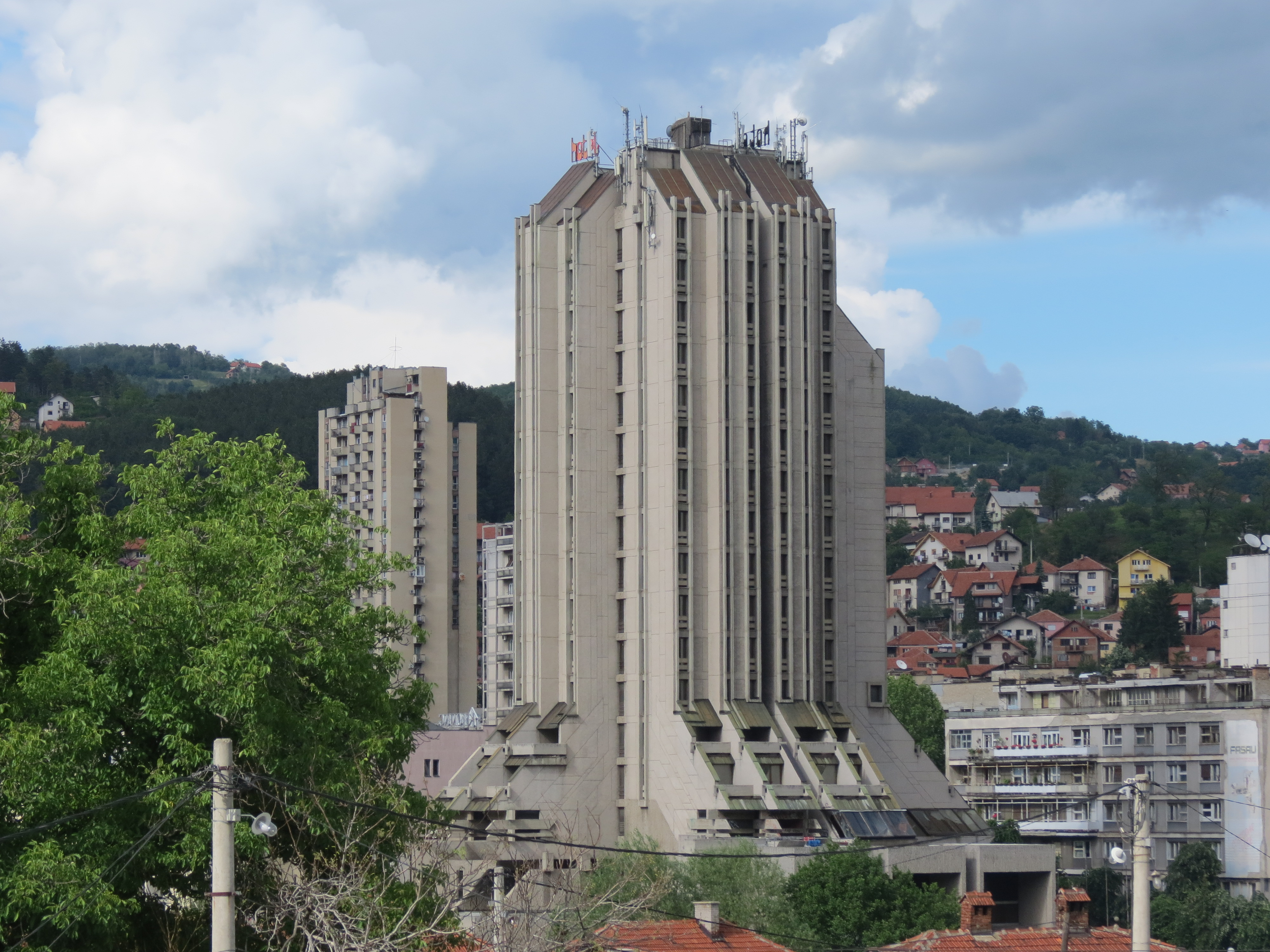
Hotel Zlatibor (1981) by Svetlana Kana Radević in Užice

=== Decentralization ===
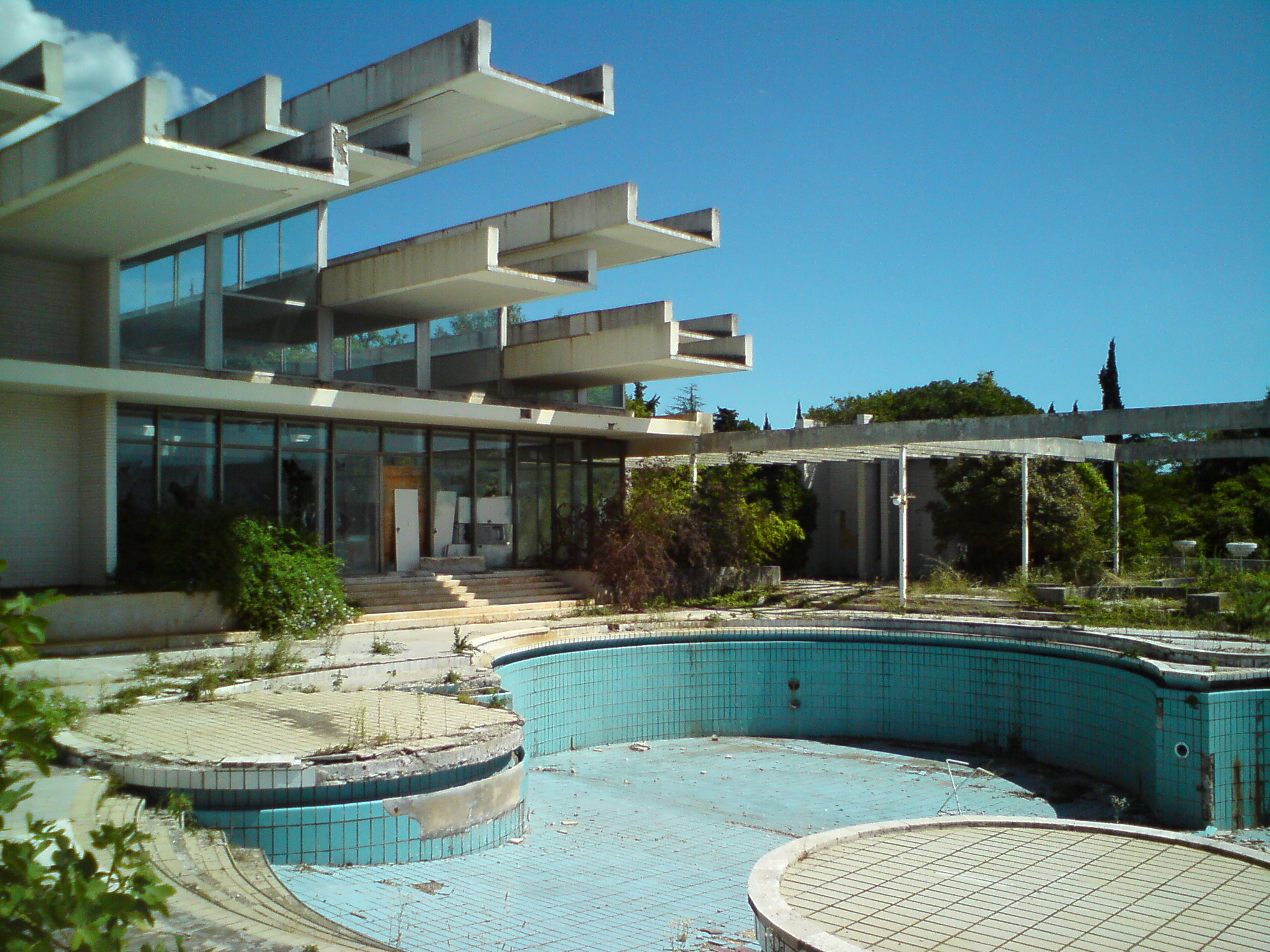
Now abandoned Haludovo Palace Hotel (1971) by Boris Magaš on Krk

With 1950s decentralization and liberalization policies in SFR Yugoslavia, architecture became increasingly fractured along ethnic lines. Architects increasingly focused on building with reference to the architectural heritage of their individual socialist republics in the form of critical regionalism. A notable example of this shift is the Juraj Neidhardt and Dušan Grabrijan's seminal 1957 publication Architecture of Bosnia and the way into modernity (Croatian: Arhitektura Bosne i Put U Suvremeno) which sought to understand modernism through the lens of Bosnia's Ottoman heritage.

Growing distinction of individual ethnic architectural identities within Yugoslavia was exacerbated with the 1972 decentralization of the formerly centralized historical preservation authority, providing individual regions further opportunity to critically analyze their own cultural narratives.

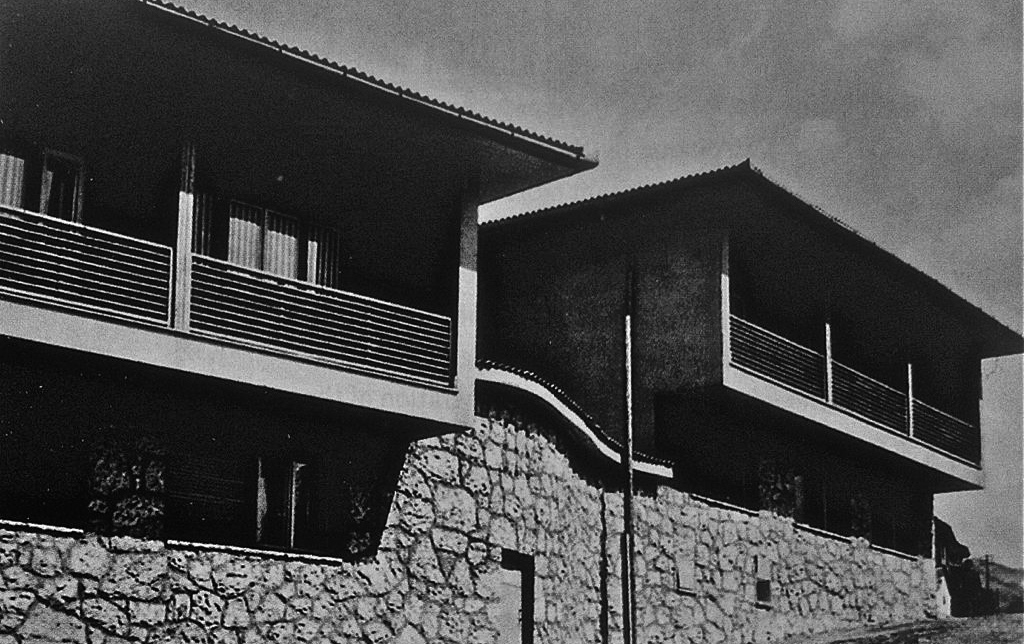
This 1953 housing complex in Džidžikovac designed by Andrija Čičin-Šain was influenced by traditional Bosnian loggias and doksa

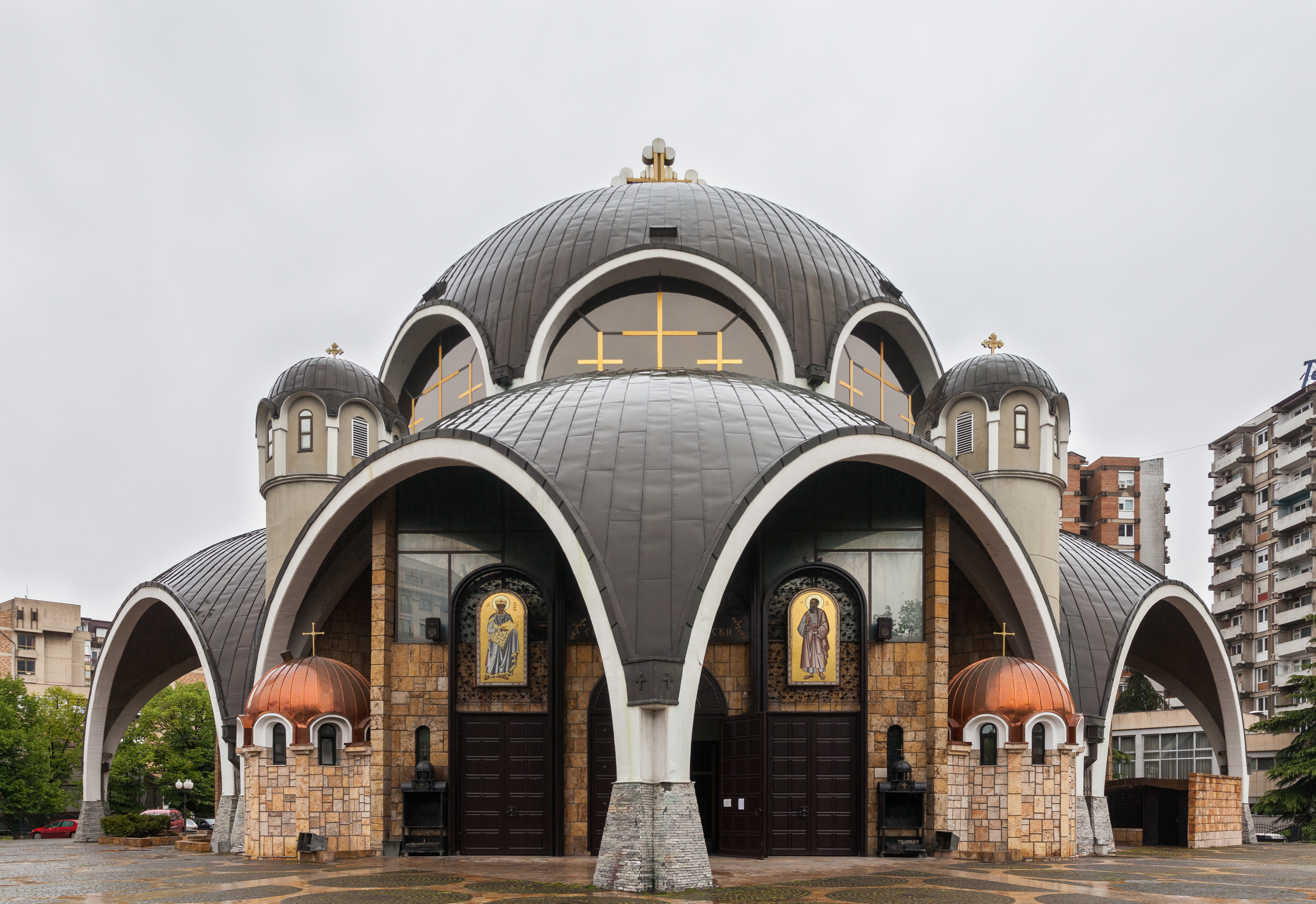
The Church of St. Clement of Ohrid (1972) by Slavko Brezoski in Skopje blurs the lines between Macedonian religious architecture and postmodernism

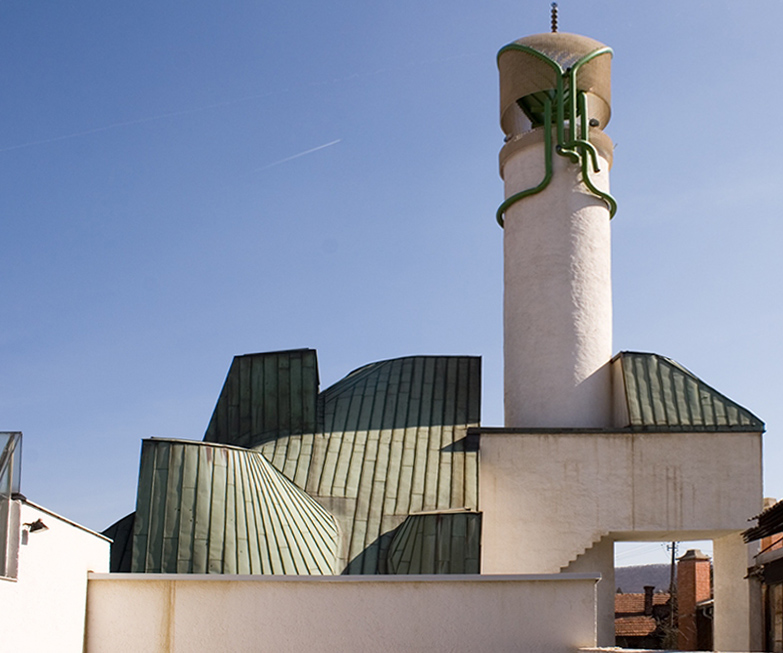
Šerefudin's White Mosque (1980) by Zlatko Ugljen in Visoko references traditional Bosnian mosque architecture

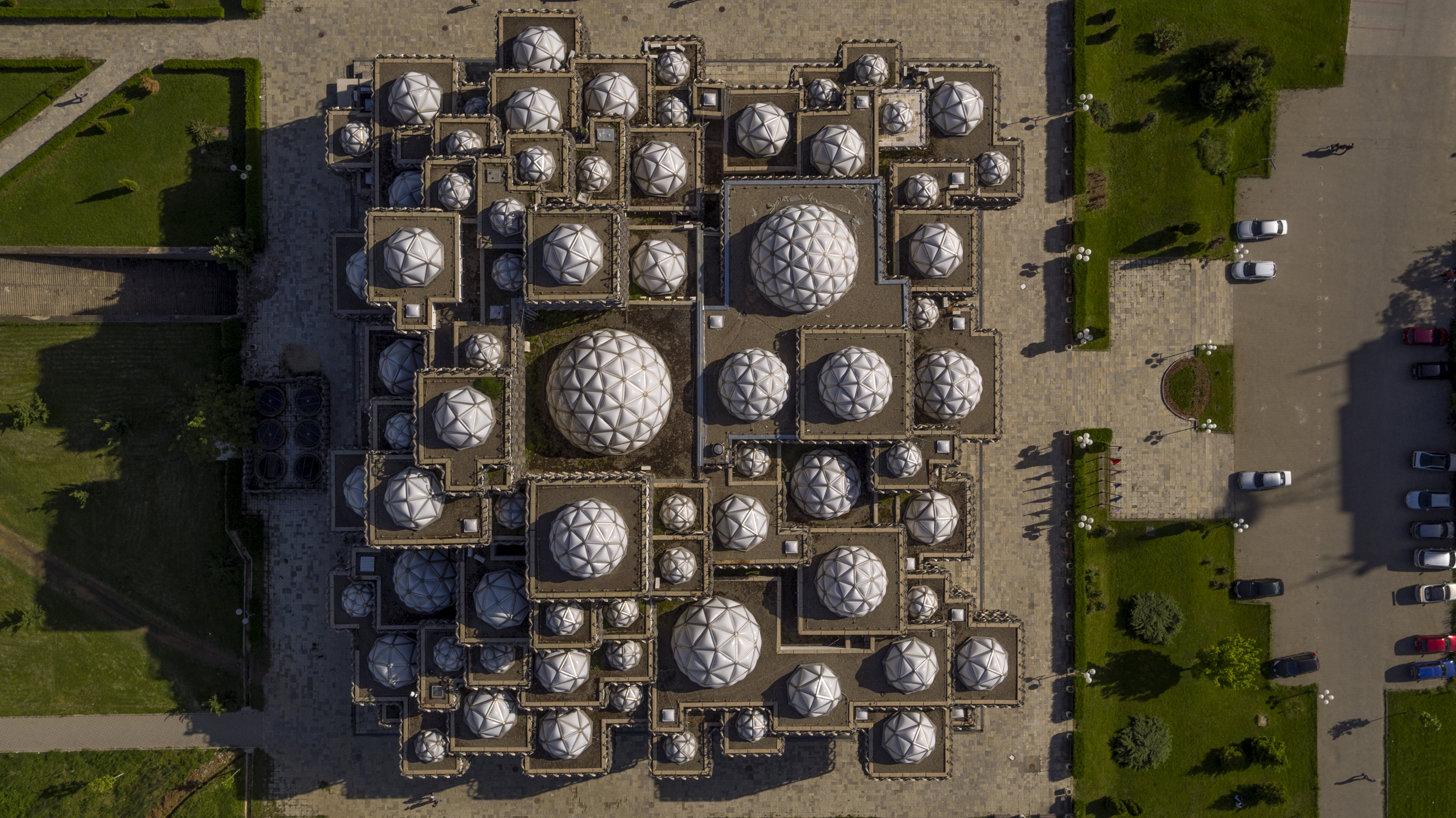
The domes of Andrija Mutnjaković's National Library of Kosovo (1982) in Pristina nod to Kosovo's Islamic heritage

== In popular culture ==
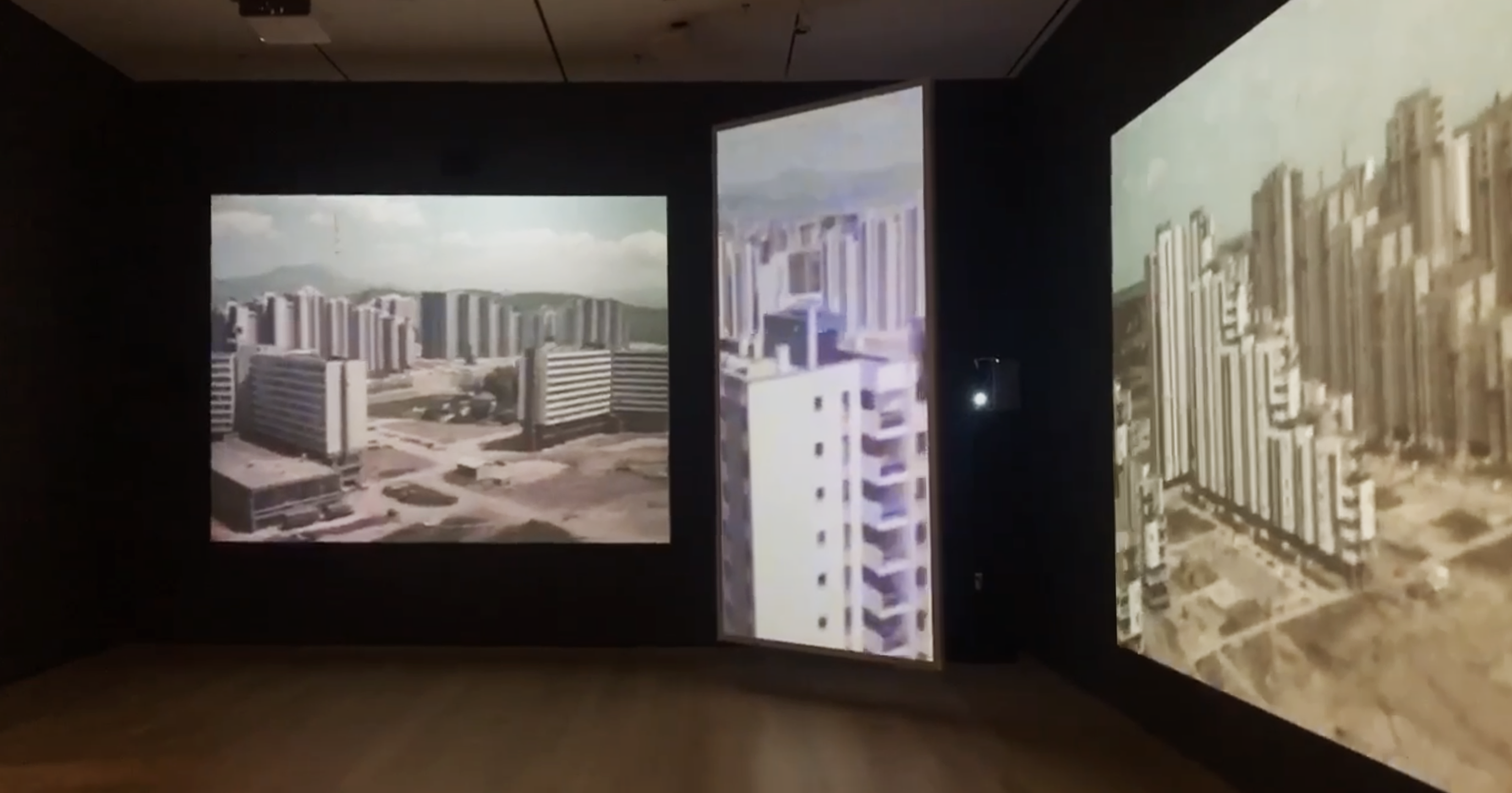
Video installation in "Toward a Concrete Utopia" exhibit at the Museum of Modern Art

Yugoslav architecture, particularly that of monuments, has attracted increased public attention in recent years. In the late 1990s and early 2000s, Belgian photographer Jan Kempenaers released a series of photographs documenting dilapidated World War II monuments and memorials in Yugoslavia. In July 2018 MoMA opened a 6 month exhibition entitled "Toward a Concrete Utopia" that provided visitors with a large collection of images, architectural models, and drawings from Yugoslav architecture from 1948 to 1980. Meanwhile, American researcher and author Donald Niebyl has been working since 2016 to create an online educational resource to explore and catalog the history of Yugoslav monuments and architecture, titled "Spomenik Database".

== See also ==
- Architecture of Serbia
- Architecture of Kosovo
- Architecture of Croatia
- Architecture of Bosnia and Herzegovina
- Architecture of Montenegro
- Architecture of North Macedonia
- Architecture of Slovenia
- Utopian architecture
