= Juraj Neidhardt =

- Born: 15 October 1901; Zagreb, Austria-Hungary
- Died: 13 July 1979 (aged 77); Sarajevo, Yugoslavia
- Occupation: Architect

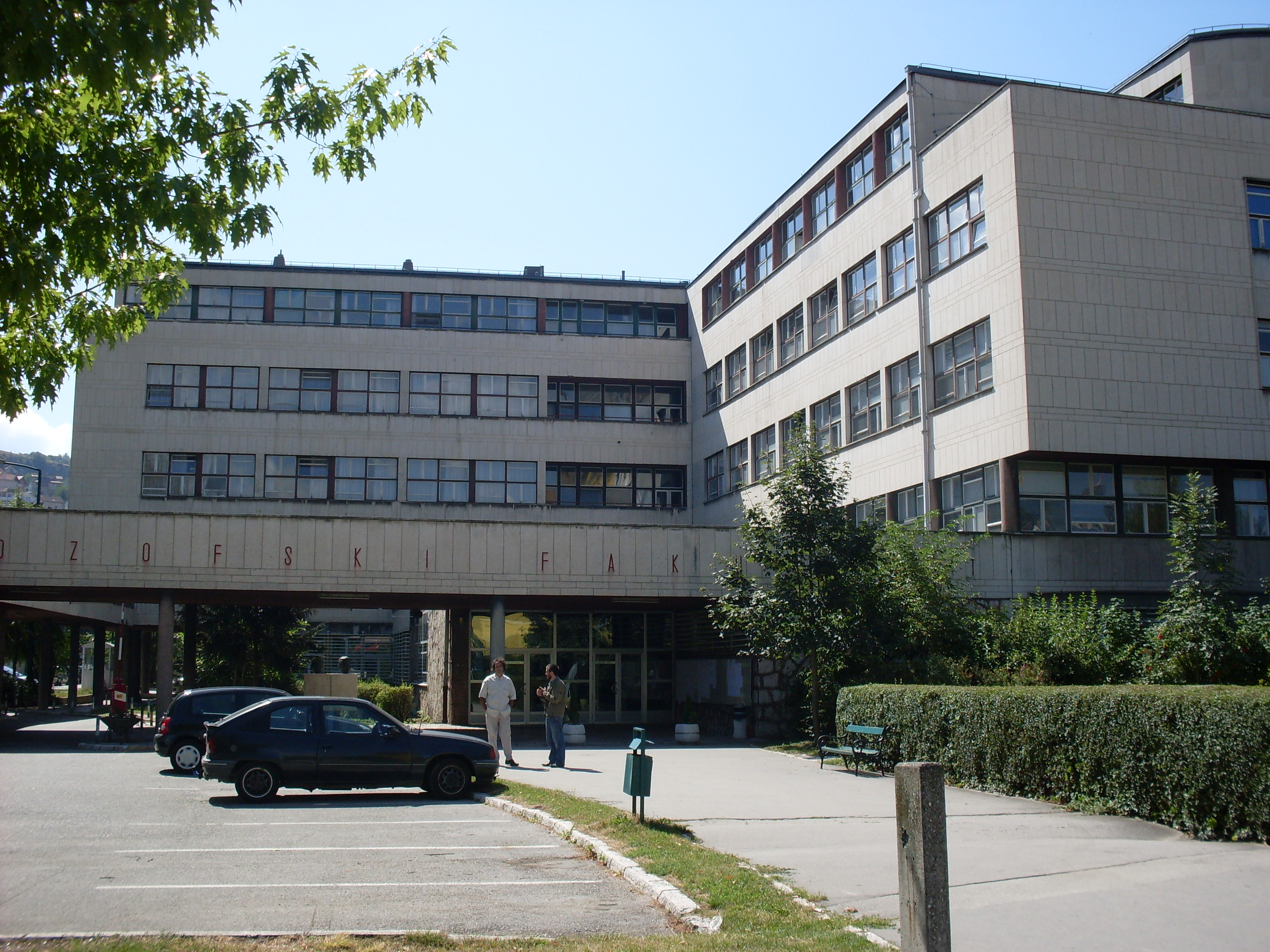
Faculty of Philosophy in Sarajevo (1955/59)

Government and Parliament buildings, Sarajevo

Juraj Neidhardt (Croatian pronunciation: [jûraj nǎjtxart]; 15 October 1901 – 13 July 1979) was a Yugoslav architect, teacher, urban planner and writer.

== Biography ==
Neidhardt was born in Zagreb on October 15, 1901. He studied architecture at the Academy of Fine Arts in Vienna, under Peter Behrens and gained a diploma in 1924. During his studies in Vienna he made an interesting project for the airport.

From 1930 to 1932 he worked for Behrens in Berlin and between 1932 and 1936 was the only paid assistant in the Paris studio of Le Corbusier. During this period Neidhardt was involved in several major projects, including a department store located in Alexanderplatz, Berlin. He was also a recipient of second prize in a competition for the Yugoslav Pavilion at the Exposition Internationale des Arts et Techniques dans la Vie Moderne, Paris (1937). He returned to Zagreb in 1937 where he designed the Theological School for the Zagreb Diocese.

He then moved to Sarajevo in 1939 and remained there until the end of his life. His decision to move to Sarajevo is greatly attributed to Dušan Grabrijan, a Slovenian-Bosnian architect, who coauthored a book with Neidhardt called Architecture of Bosnia and Voyage to Modern.

Neidhardt became a professor (1953) at the Architectural Faculty at the University of Sarajevo. Architecture in Bosnia and its regional characteristics preoccupied Neidhardt for the rest of his life. His principal works included low-cost housing estates, for example at Vareš, Zenica and Ljubija, and, more prominently, the Philosophy Faculty (1955–9), the Institute of Physics and Chemistry (1959–64; both of which were heavily damaged in 1994) as well as the urban plan (1954) for the centre of Marindvor, all in Sarajevo. His buildings and major urban schemes were all marked with the synthesis of traditional building elements and modern technological and artistic developments, with a strong emphasis on the integration of architecture with landscape.

Neidhardt's most significant architectural works include works on the ski house at Trebević, Faculty of Philosophy, Chemical-Physical Institute, House of Scouts (Dom Izviđača) in Sarajevo, the urban core solution at Marindvor in Sarajevo, Parliament building of Bosnia and Herzegovina.

Juraj Neidhardt died in Sarajevo, aged 77, and is buried in a Sarajevo cemetery called Bare.
