= Ivan Zemljak =

Croatian architect (1893–1963)

- Born: 15 March 1893; Zagreb, Kingdom of Croatia-Slavonia
- Died: 1 January 1963 (aged 69); Zagreb, Yugoslavia

Ivan Zemljak (Zagreb, 1893 - Zagreb, 1963) was a Croatian modernist architect, best known for his designs for schools.

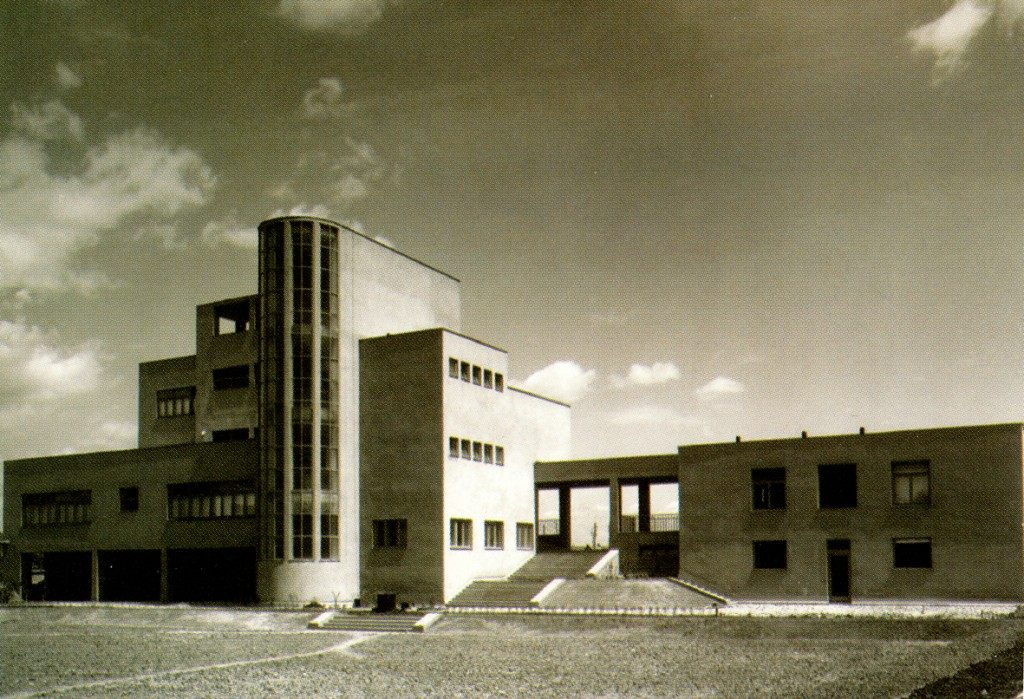
Selska Road School (1930) in Zagreb

== Life ==
Zemljak studied at the Graz University of Technology from 1912 to 1914, later attending the German Technical College in Prague. Following his 1920 graduation, Zemljak worked in Zagreb, where he completed a number of projects.

In 1929, Zemljak visited Germany and the Netherlands where he came into contact with neoplasticism and the work of Jacobus Oud.

Zemljak's style was characterized by the fusion of elements of the international style with features of traditional Croatian architecture.

== Works ==
- 1924 House, Nike Grškovića 11, Zagreb
- 1928 Apartment building, Masarykova 13, Zagreb
- 1930 Jordanov School, Jordanovac 113, Zagreb
- 1930 Selska Road school, Selska cesta 19, Zagreb
- 1933 Jakićevo Road school, Zagreb
- 1935 Koturaška Road school, Koturaška ulica, Zagreb
- 1935 Observatory in Jordanovac, Zagreb
- 1937 Craft school, Savska 39, Zagreb
- 1940 School and pediatrician in Knežija, Zadarska 31, Zagreb

== Gallery ==
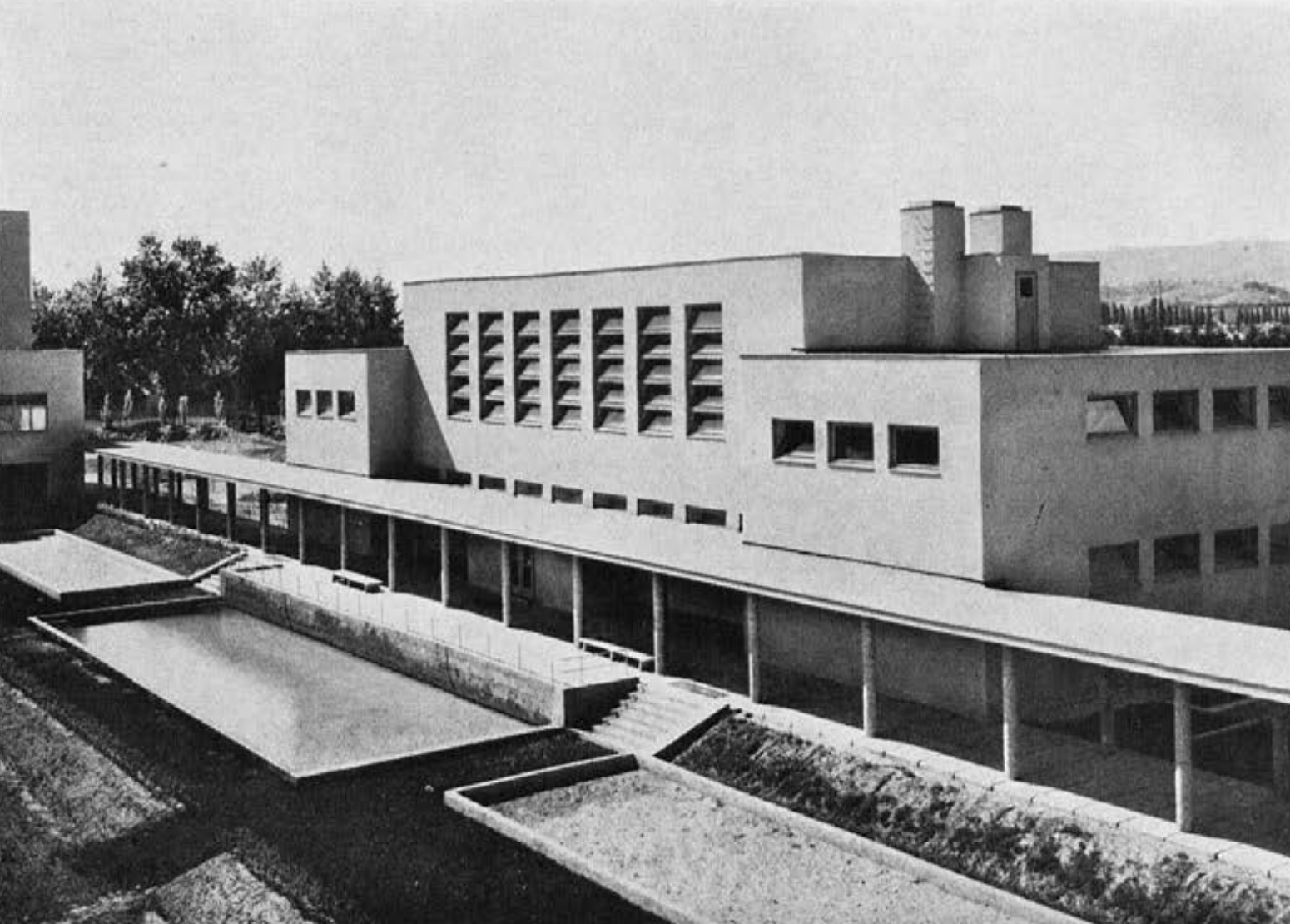
Building on Selska Road

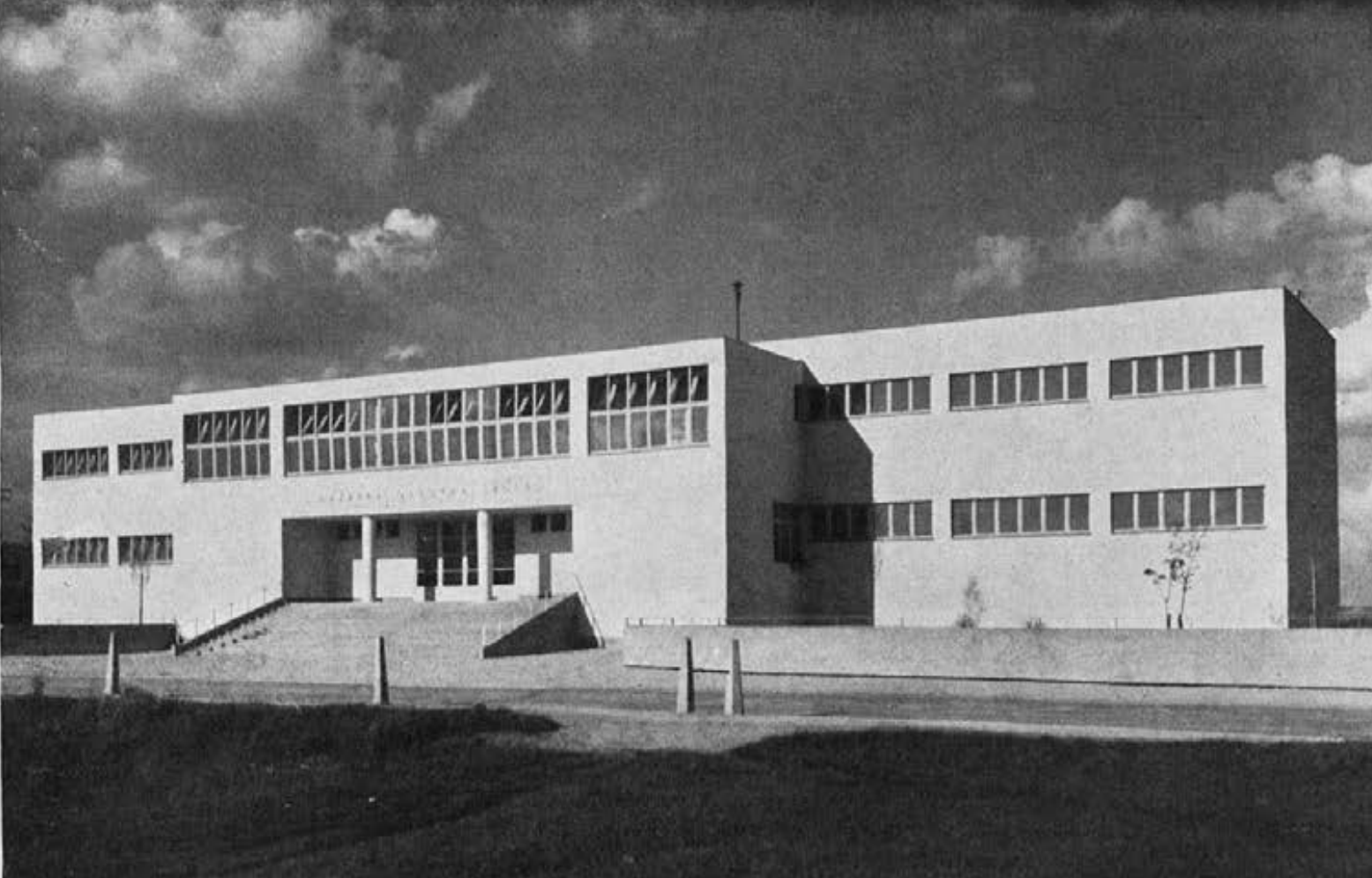
Selska Road School (1930)

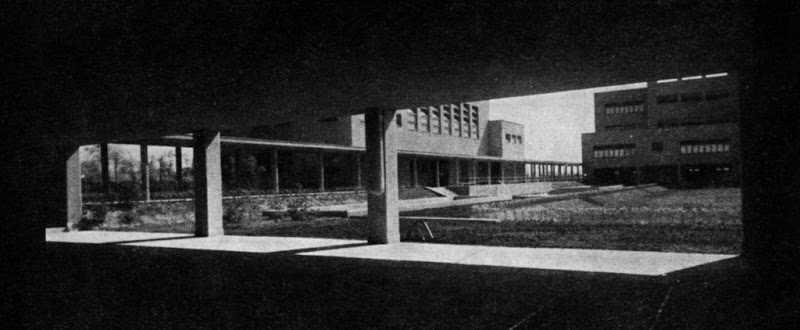
Selska Road School (1930)

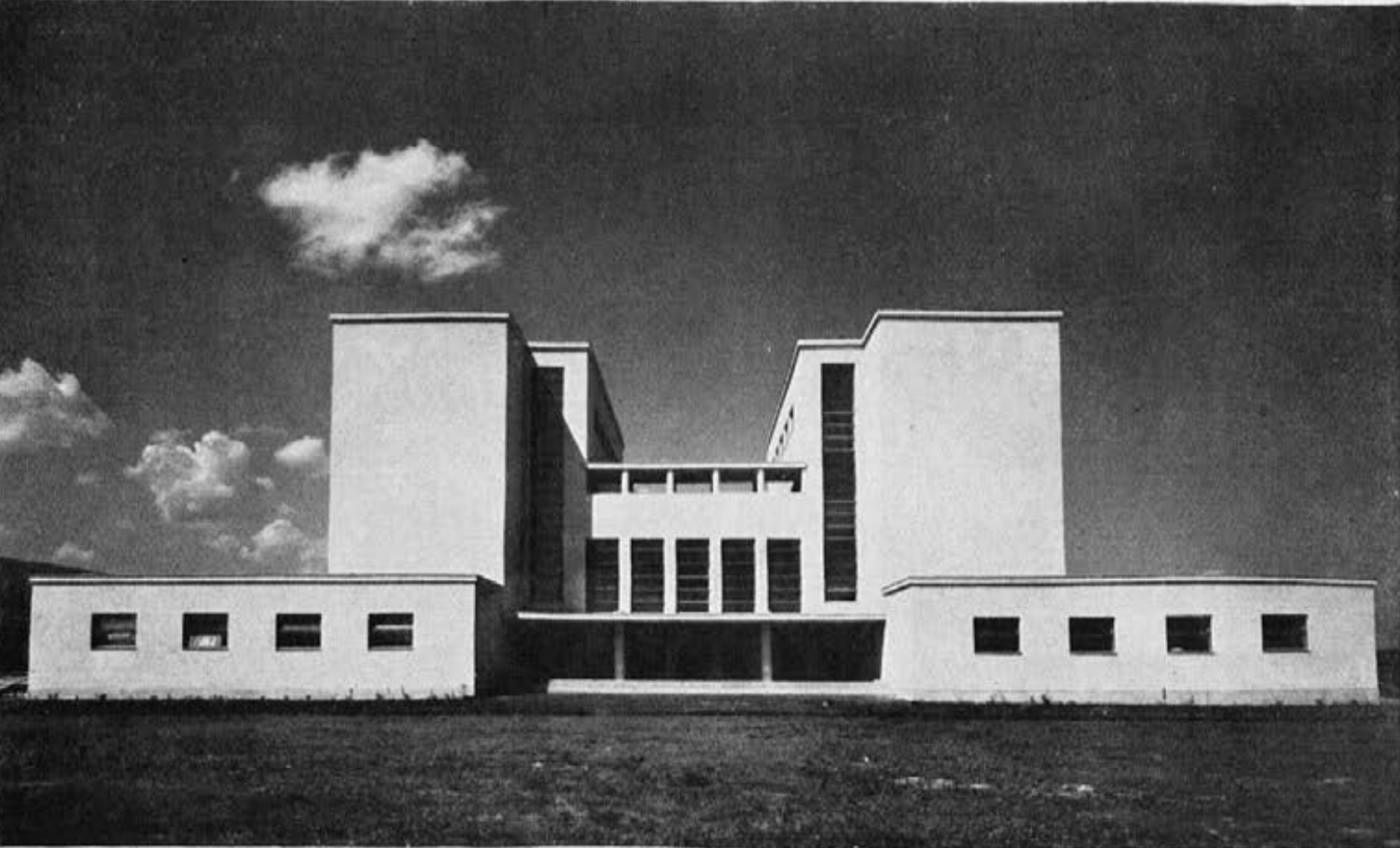
Jordanov School (1930)
