= Svetlana Kana Radević =

Yugoslav and Montenegrin architect

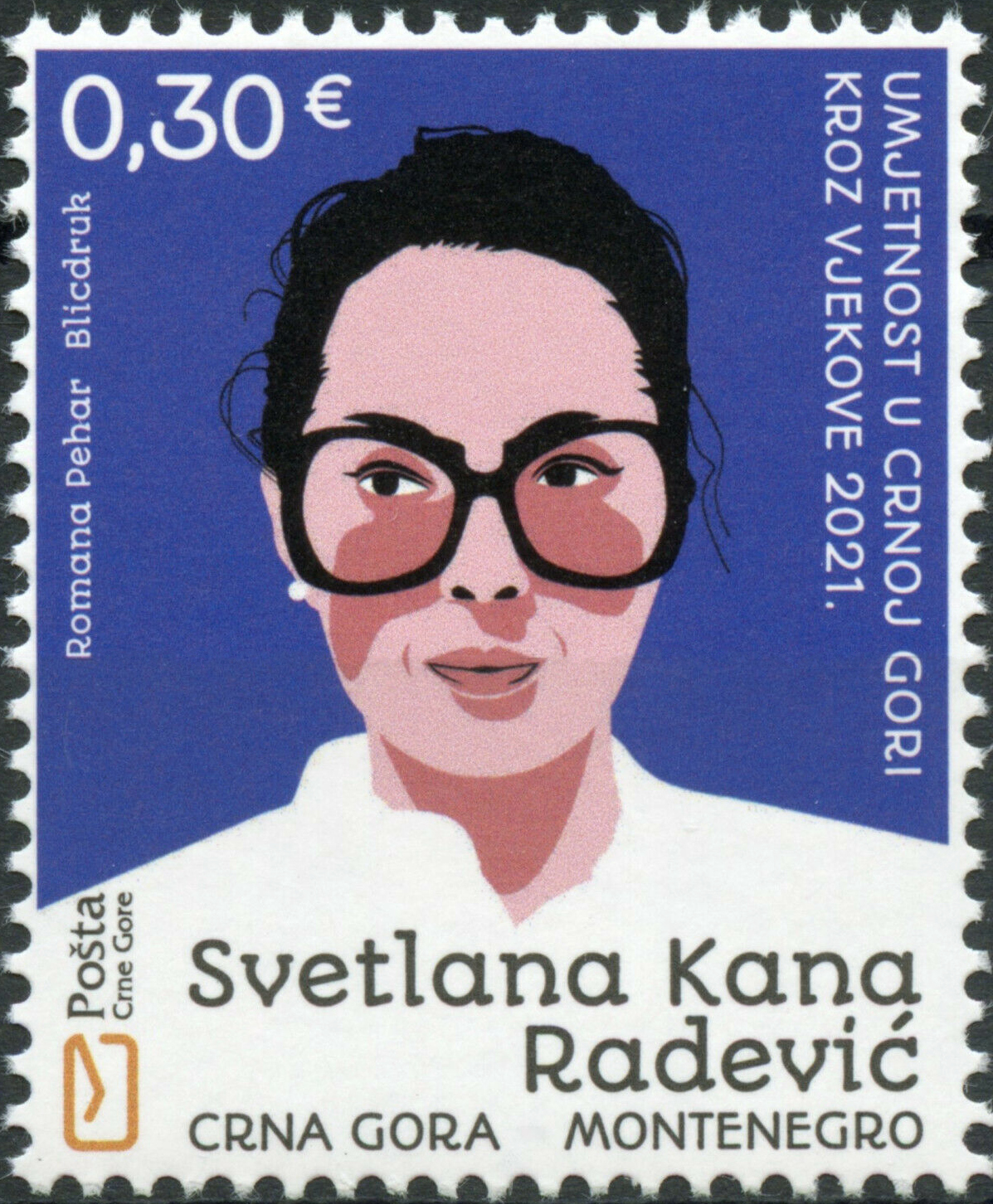
- Svetlana Kana Radević on a 2021 stamp of Montenegro
- Born: 21 November 1937; Cetinje, Kingdom of Yugoslavia (now Montenegro)
- Died: 8 November 2000 (aged 62); Montenegro, FR Yugoslavia
- Education: University of Belgrade; University of Pennsylvania
- Occupation: architect
- Known for: First female Montenegrin architect/Hotel Podgorica

Svetlana Kana Radević (Cyrillic: Светлана Кана Радевић; 21 November 1937 – 8 November 2000) was a Yugoslav and Montenegrin architect, credited as the first female Montenegrin architect. Her work has been recognized by two national architecture prizes.

== Biography ==
Svetlana Kana Radević was born on 21 November 1937 in Cetinje, Yugoslavia, where she attended elementary school and then completed high school at Slobodan Škerović Gymnasium in Titograd (now Podgorica). She graduated from the Faculty of Architecture at the University of Belgrade and then went on to attain a master's degree from the University of Pennsylvania. She continued her studies in Japan, which strongly influenced her later work.

She was a full member of Doclean Academy of Sciences and Arts and the first vice president of Matica crnogorska, as well as a foreign member of the Russian Academy of Architecture and Construction Sciences. Her style was distinctive for the selection of materials she used, melding the structures with their external environment and the substantial size and power of her designs. Her most noted work was the Hotel Podgorica, for which she won the Federal Borba Award for Architecture in 1967. The building typifies her style in that it uses stone, a traditional building material, to play with unique shapes which jut out from the façade, in an nontraditional manner. At the same time, the building fits into the landscape as if its concrete mass were always part of the environment. Her Monument to the Fallen Soldiers of Lješanska nahija in Barutana also won a national competition in 1975.

Radević died on 8 November 2000.

== Works ==
- Kruševac Business Center and bus station
- Hotel Podgorica
- Hotel Mojkovac
- Hotel Zlatibor, Užice (Serbia)
- Lexicographic Institute
- Monument to the Fallen Soldiers of Lješanska nahija, Barutana
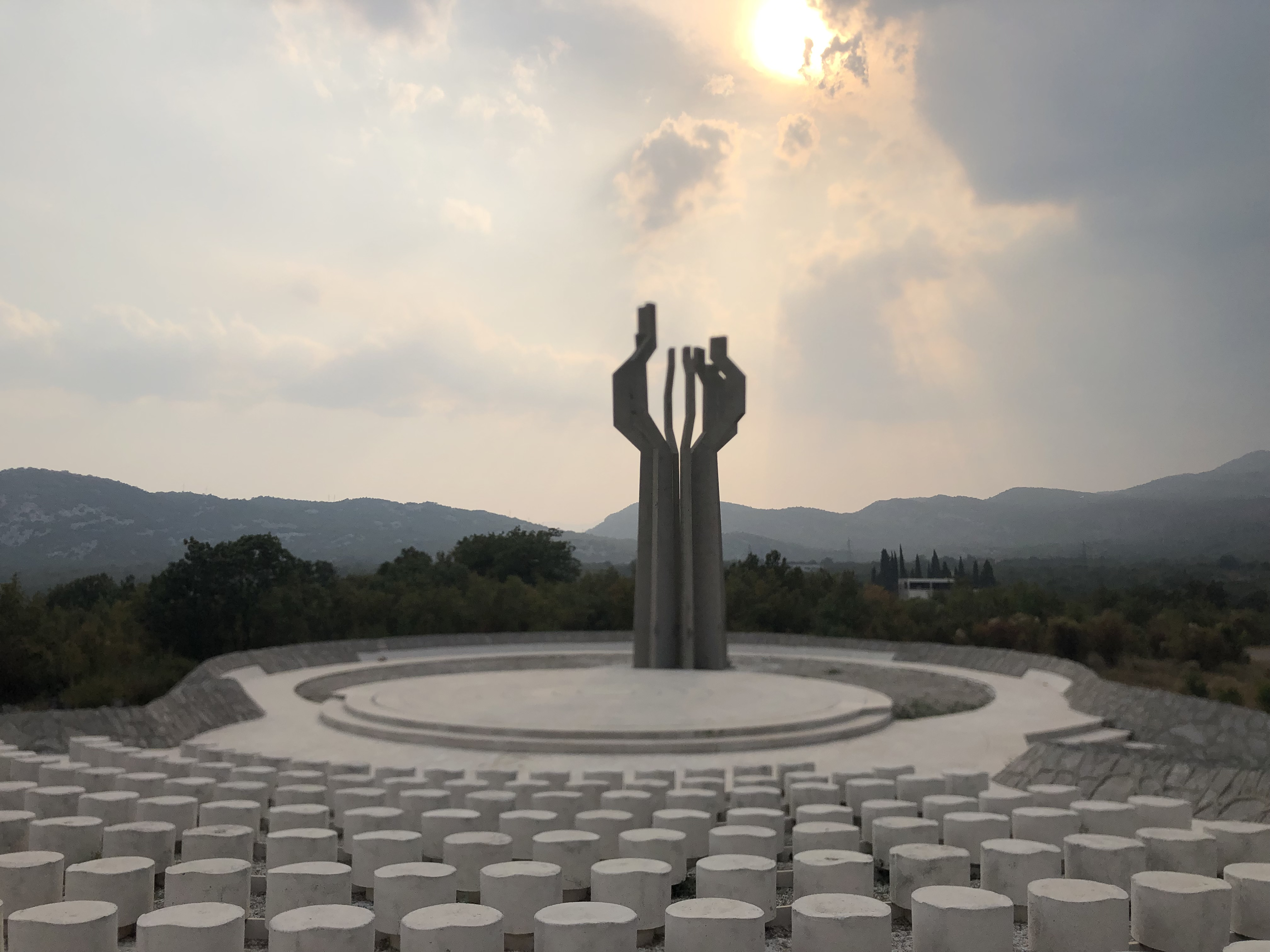
Barutana Memory Park (1980)

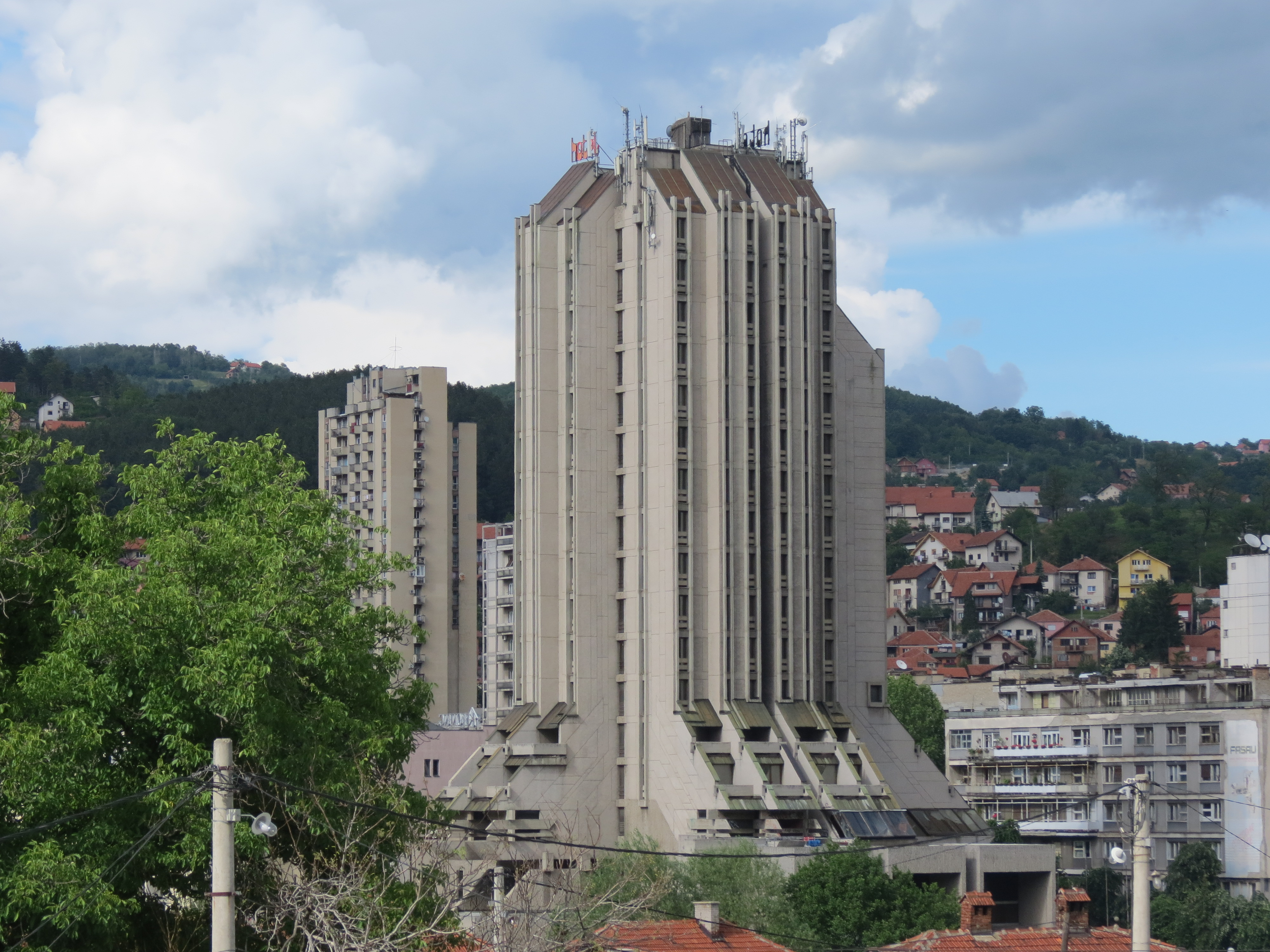
Hotel Zlatibor, Užice (1981)

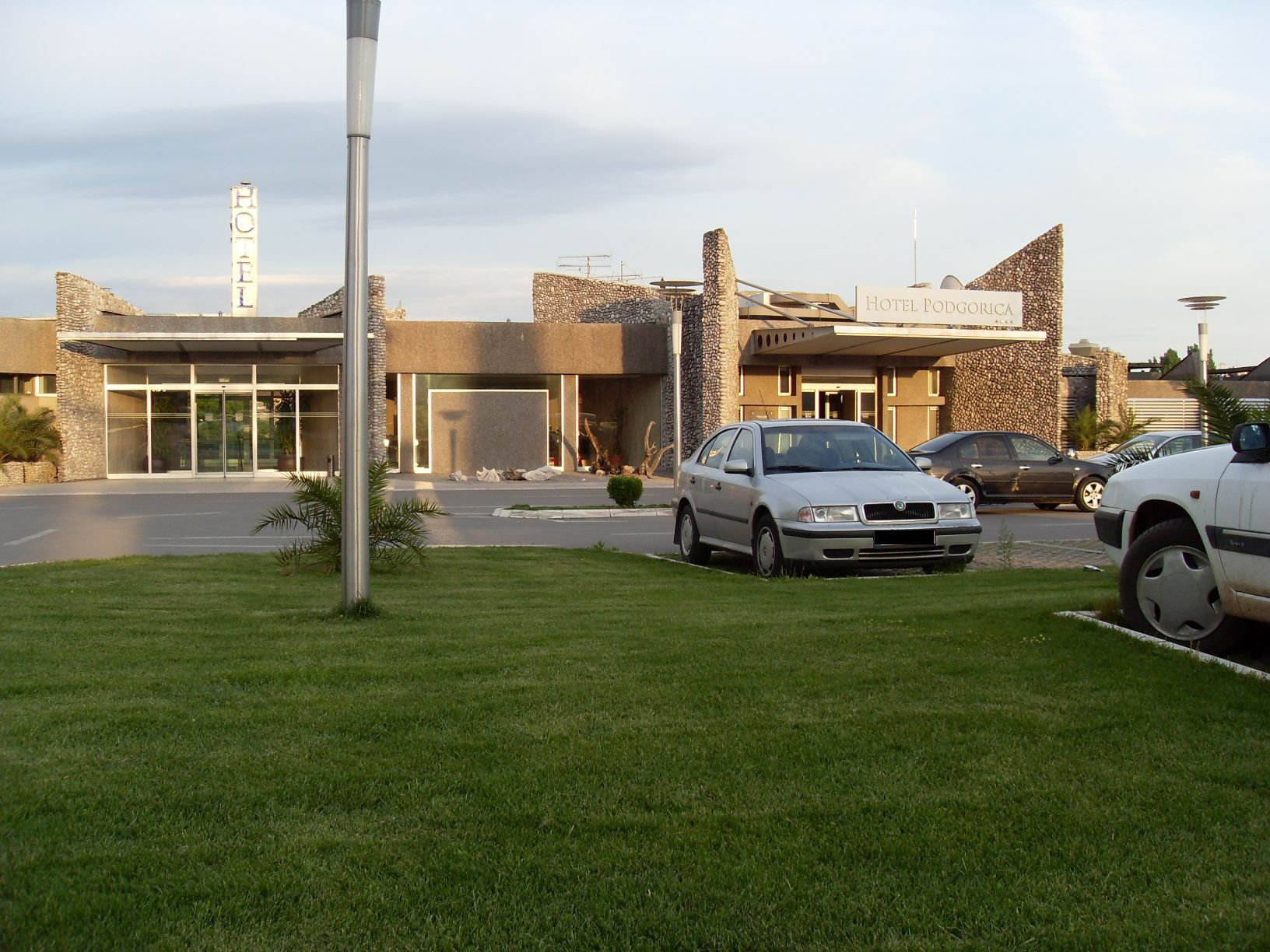
Hotel Podgorica

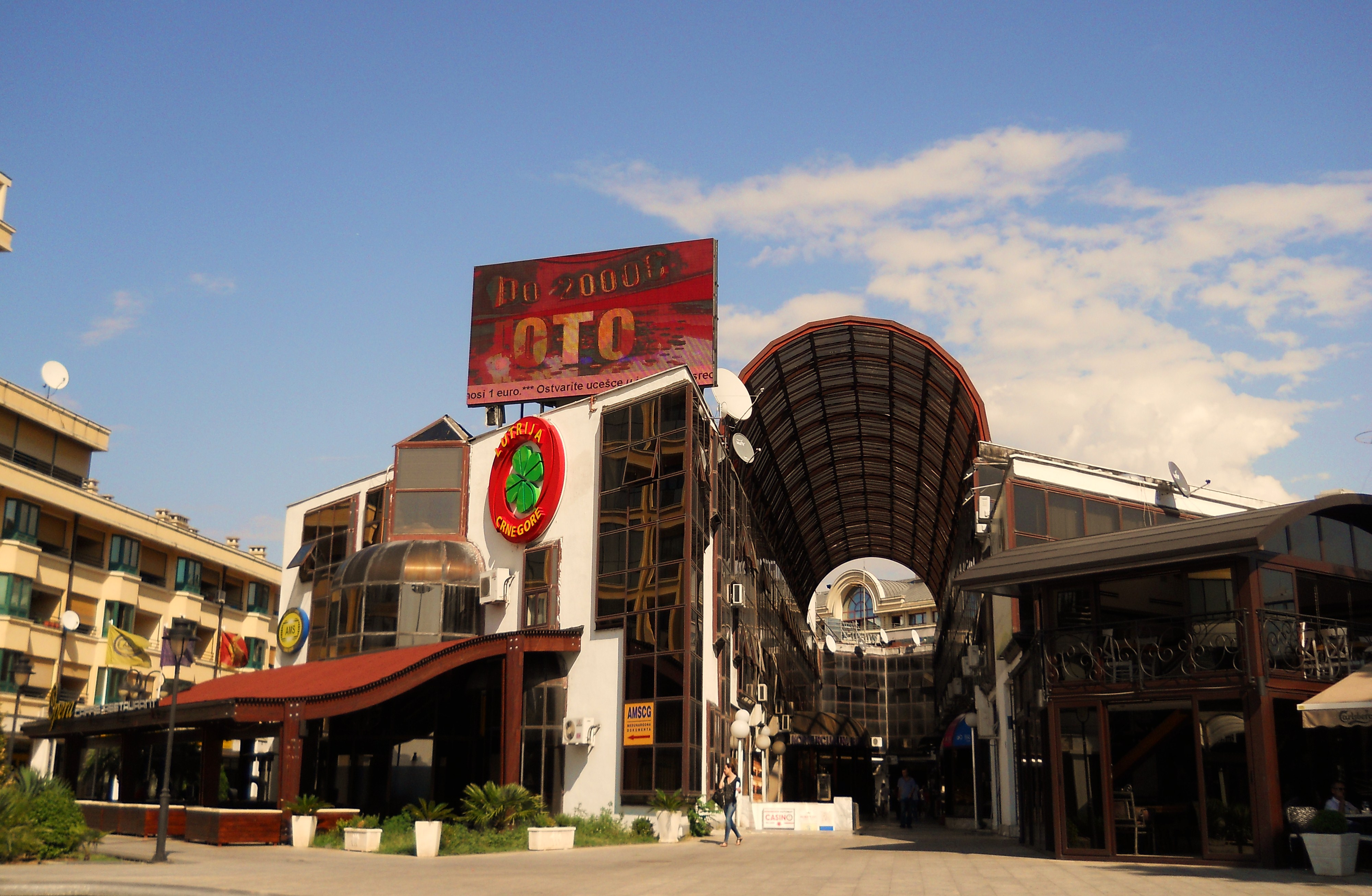
Kruševac Business Center
