= Architecture of Montenegro =

The architecture of Montenegro is a mixture of many influences, from Roman and Venetian to Ottoman and modern times.

== Characteristics ==
Montenegro has a number of significant cultural and historical sites, including heritage sites from the pre-Romanesque, Gothic and Baroque periods.

The Montenegrin coastal region is especially well known for its religious monuments, including the Cathedral of Saint Tryphon, the basilica of St. Luke (over 800 years), Our Lady of the Rock (Škrpjela), the Savina Monastery, the Cetinje Monastery and others.

This area, sometimes called Venetian Montenegro, is full of Venetian architecture, mainly in Cattaro (Kotor) and Perasto (Perast): the ancient city of Cattaro is listed on the UNESCO World Heritage list.

The Byzantine Empire's influence in architecture and in religious artwork is especially apparent in the country's interior.

The majority of architecture of Montenegro is Byzantine, Latin or Venetian (Gothic, Romanesque, Baroque) and Ottoman.

== The architecture of "Storica Cattaro" (venetian for "Stari Kotor") ==
Four centuries of Venetian domination have given the city the typical Venetian architecture, that contributed to make Kotor a UNESCO world heritage site.

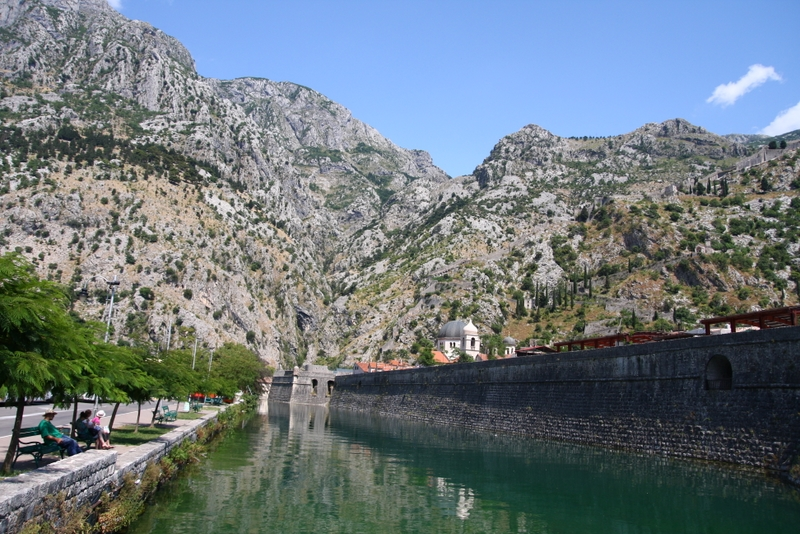
The Venetian fortifications of Kotor

The Venetian fortification system of Kotor (that venetians called "Cattaro"), which protects it from the sea, is actually a wall 4.5 km long, 20 m high and 15 m wide, and is preserved as one of the world's historic values by the UNESCO.

The construction of the ramparts were built and rebuilt up to the 18th century. The oldest town gate of Cattaro, of the three existing in the town, is the “South” gate which was partially constructed in the 9th century. The “North” and the “Main” gates were built in the Renaissance style by the first half of the 16th century. The most representative monument of Roman architecture in the Adriatic is the magnificent Cathedral of Saint Tryphon, constructed in 1166 and built on the remains of the former temple from the 9th century. There are the remains of the frescos from the 14th century and the valuable treasury with domestic and Venetian golden works dating from the 14th to the 20th century.

Besides the Cathedral, in the heart of the old town, there are magnificent examples of sacral architecture originating from 12th till 20th century:

- The Romanic church of St. Lucas was built in 1195, while the Romanic church of St. Ana dates from the end of the 12th century and has frescos dating back from the 15th century.
- The Romanic church of St. Mary dates from 1221. The church contains the remains of a monumental fresco painting as well as an early Christian baptistry.-
- The Gothic church of St. Mihovil was built on the remains of the Benediction monastery from the 7th century with frescos dating back from the 15th century.
- St. Clara's church dates from the 14th century with the extremely beautiful marble altar, the work of Francesco Cabianca, from the 18th century.
- The Church of Lady of Health originates from the 15th century.
- The Orthodox Church of St. Nicolas was built by the beginning of the 20th century with a valuable collection of icons.

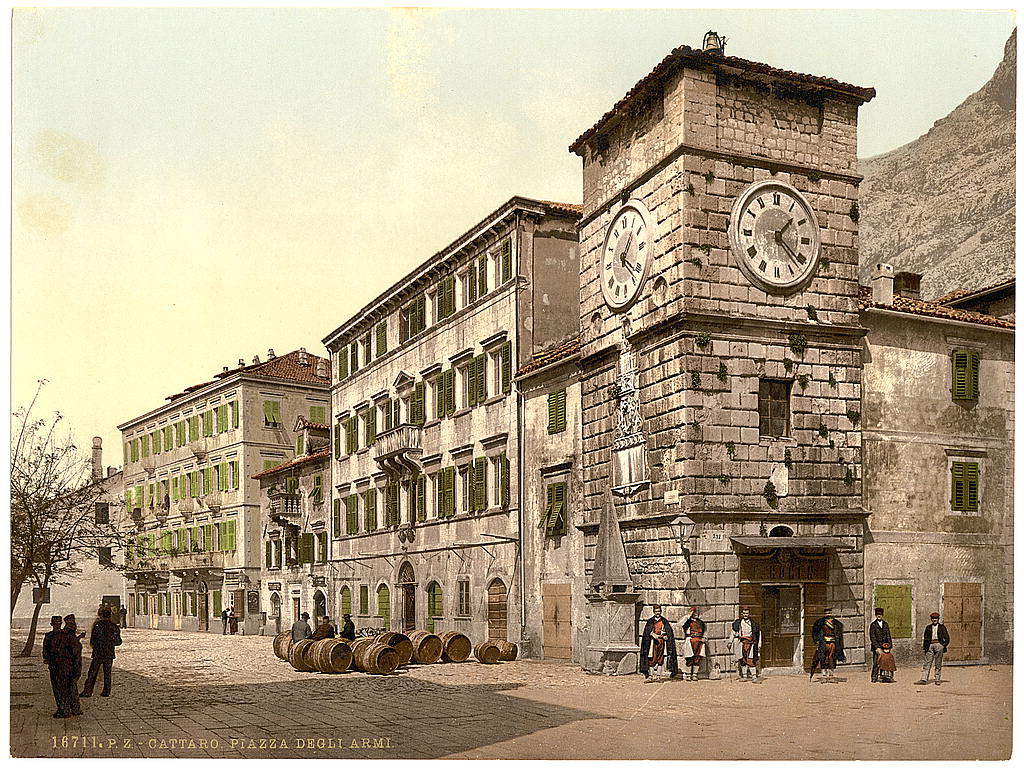
Postcard of Old Cattaro, showing typical venetian architecture buildings and the "Clock tower"

There are also numerous palaces in venetian style in the Kotor Stari Grad:

The "Drago palace" with Gothic windows from the 15th century; the "Bizanti palace" from the 17th century; the "Pima palace", with typical Venetian renaissance and baroque forms from the 16th century; the "Grubonia palace" with the built-in emblem of the old Kotor's pharmacy established in 1326; the "Gregurina palace", from the 17th century, which today contains the Naval museum, and finally the "Clock tower", from the 16th century, with the medieval pillory just beside it.

== See also ==
- Venetian Albania
- Cattaro Cathedral
- Natural and Culturo-Historical Region of Kotor
- Cetinje Monastery
- Sveti Stefan
- Budva

== Bibliography ==
- Realm of the Black Mountain: A History of Montenegro by Elizabeth Roberts (Hurst & Co, 2007) ISBN 978-1-85065-868-9
