= Dušan Grabrijan =

Slovenian-Bosnian architect, architectural theorist and professor

Dušan Grabrijan (1899–1952) was a Slovenian-Bosnian architect, architectural theorist and professor.

Grabrijan was a student of Jože Plečnik. In Ljubljana, he is known, for example, for the monument to Slovene Modernist poets Ivan Cankar, Dragotin Kette, and Josip Murn at Žale. He came to Sarajevo in 1930; there, he spent 20 years of his life working on purpose of architectural improvement of the city of Sarajevo. Also he worked as professor at the Secondary Technical School in Sarajevo, where during the thirties he published a number of works.

One of the fields that most attracted him was the Oriental House, adapted to the context of Bosnian culture.
