= Lichtblau =

Lichtblau is a surname. Notable people with the surname include:

- Eric Lichtblau (born 1965), American journalist
- Ernst Lichtblau (1883–1963), Austrian architect and designer
- Franz Lichtblau, German architect
- Leon Lichtblau (1901–1938), Romanian socialist and communist militant, and Soviet statistician
