= Koseze =

Koseze may refer to several places in Slovenia:

- Koseze, Ilirska Bistrica, a settlement in the Municipality of Ilirska Bistrica, southern Slovenia
- Koseze, Ljubljana, a neighborhood in Ljubljana, the capital of Slovenia
  - Koseze Pond
- Koseze, Vodice, a settlement in the Municipality of Vodice, northern Slovenia
- Spodnje Koseze, a settlement in the Municipality of Lukovica, northern Slovenia
- Zgornje Koseze, a settlement in the Municipality of Moravče, northern Slovenia
