= Bosnian style in architecture =

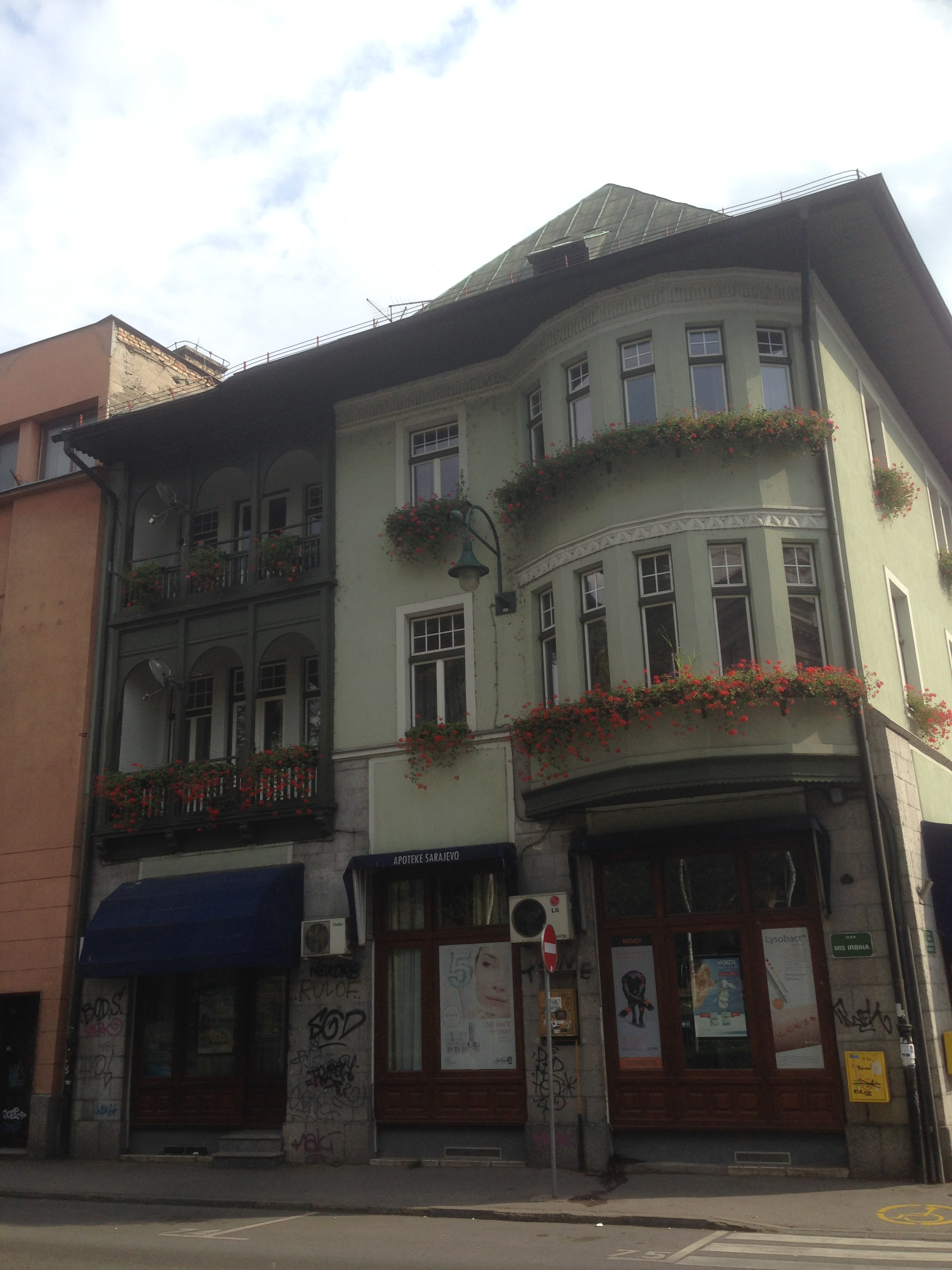
Building of the Land Waqf – an example of Bosnian style in architecture

The Bosnian style in architecture is a specific architectural expression at the beginning of the 20th century, which evolved from the traditional architecture of Vienna Secession and from the awareness of the fact that the work originated in Bosnia and Herzegovina.

The Bosnian style can be compared with Scandinavian National Romanticism. The Bosnian Style was championed by a younger generation of architects, like Czech architect Josip Pospišil (Josef Pospíšil), Slovene architect Rudolf Tönnies, and Austrian architect Ernst Lichtblau, who all studied at the Art Academy in Vienna with Karl von Hasenauer and Otto Wagner. The style was, however, named by Sarajevo’s senior architect, Josip Vancaš, for whom many of these younger architects worked.

Although the Bosnian style was lauded as more sympathetic in its local inspiration, Gunzberger-Makas and Damljanovic-Conley argue that its stress remained on the Islamic component of Bosnian vernacular architecture, often with historical rather than contemporary sources. The shift from Moorish Revival to Bosnian Style was thus "the substitution of one historicist collage for another", in which pan-Islamic motifs were replaced with pan-vernacular motifs, ambiguously connecting Ottoman architecture with that of the present, and wrongly suggesting theses motives to be specifically Bosnian, while they are found throughout the Ottoman Balkans. The Bosnian Style may thus be "best understood as within the tradition of national romanticism", although its designers were not from within the nation they aimed to represent. As it still focused on the differences from Western and Central Europe, and it did not change the power relations about the scripted, imperial interpretations of local architecture, the Bosnian Style was no less Orientalist than Moorish Revival.

== Development of Bosnian style ==
During its reign, the Austro-Hungarian authorities sought to impose and build architecture of European styles in Bosnia and Herzegovina and thus to show the meaning of their mission in the occupied country. Initially, it offered historic styles that built the most representative buildings of the second half of the 19th century in Vienna. In Bosnia, too much was built in foreign building styles, primarily historicism, and too little appreciated, respected, and used the vernacular Bosnian methods of building.

Confronted with the multinational population structure in Bosnia and Herzegovina, the government realized that it was necessary to have a political ear when choosing one of the historical styles. For construction in areas where the Bosniak population was predominant, architects used the Moorish Revival style. Over time, it turned out that this style did not fit, as well as others, because it did not arise in the development of architectural thought and practice based on indigenous architectural heritage.

In the late 19th and early 20th centuries, there was a movement amongst architects and engineers towards creating a truly Bosnian style.

=== Ernst Lichtblau ===
Viennese architect Ernst Lichtblau, apprentice of Otto Wagner, in 1904, studied the ancient residential architecture throughout Bosnia and Herzegovina, seeking to create a modern style based on these indigenous forms. His work in Bosnia is one example of the Wagner School's contact with architecture in Bosnia and Herzegovina.

His drawings were published in 1907 in the journal Der Architekt. They depict groups of old houses under the Jajce Fortress. He was impressed by the cascading and cubist forms of the roofs, the simple but powerful shapes of the houses, modeled by light and fine valers of scale black, white and brown. Thanks to the Art Nouveau interpretation of the contents, in them the old architecture of Bosnia manifested its hidden and subtle artistic values, reaching the level at which the points of contact with modern architecture showed themselves.

In another group of drawings, Lichtblau seeks to create houses or buildings for contemporary needs, contemporary forms and construction. Some drawings show an effort to create a typical house that would take the form of an old residential architecture, some again represent the example of a representative house - villas for Bosnia - of course again designed and designed according to the same principle.

The project for a house in Bosnia was created as early as 1904, so that date can be taken as the beginning of the development or search for a Bosnian style. Because in that Lichtblau project there are already significant components of the old Bosnian architecture - such as the elevated position of the house, the terraced access zone, the environment where the green is very significant is carefully cultivated, the house is enclosed by a high wall around a narrow courtyard. The house itself - the villa - shows that the architect respects the one-story elevation of the old houses; the house has latticework on the corner - with moldings - windows, a high pyramidal roof, white walls, size and proportion, elements and whole derived from old houses and built to new standards.

Lichtblau goes a step further. He designed a villa in Vienna in full Bosnian style, giving this architectural expression European and universal legitimacy.

Lichtbau designs the State Forest Directorate's project as a modern building with the characteristics of a centrally developed layout of a Bosnian apartment building.

=== Josip Vancaš ===
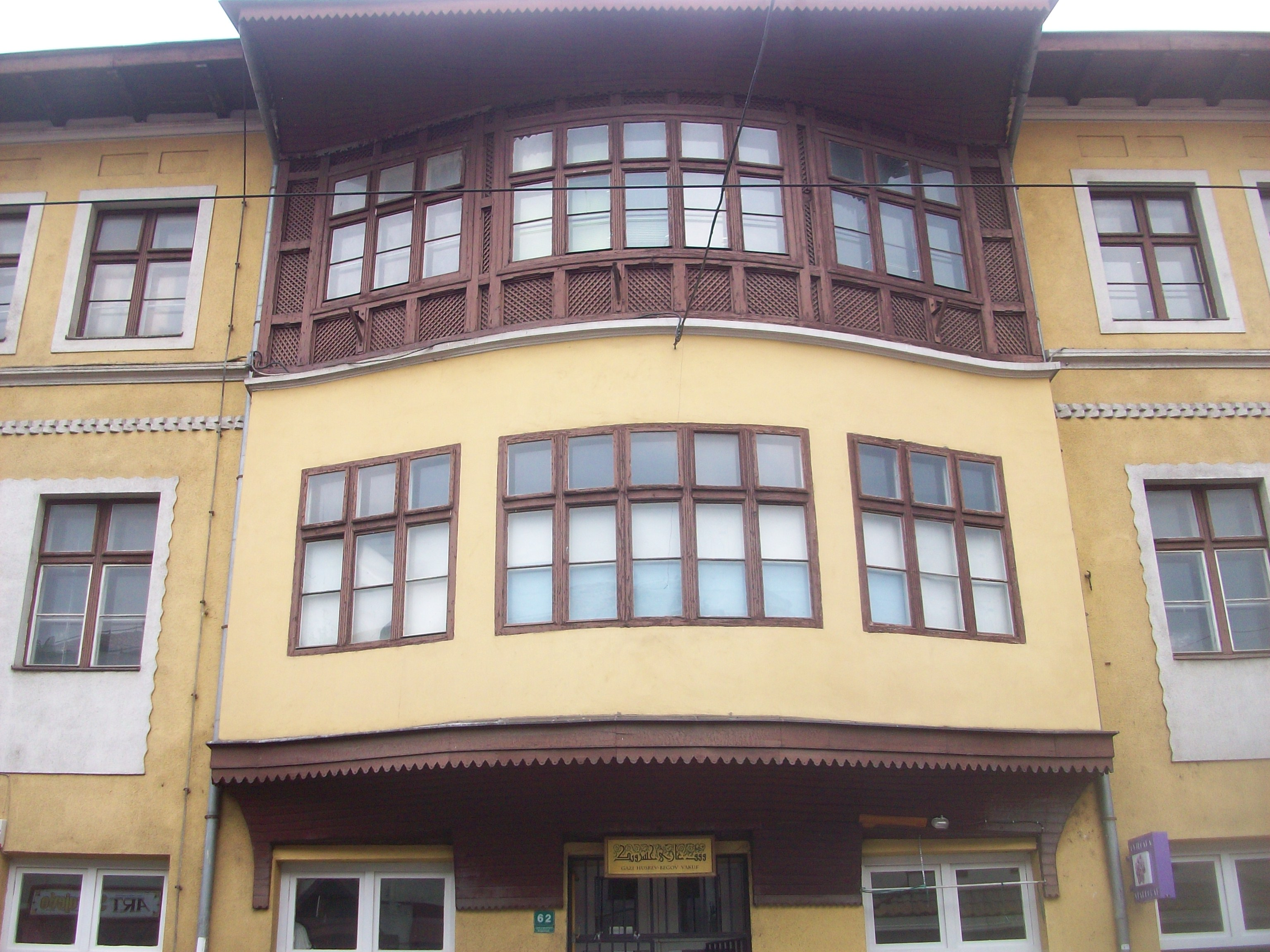
Hotel Stari Grad in Sarajevo, by Josip Vancaš (1909).

In his first search for a Bosnian style, Josip Vancaš himself studied old houses, made sketches, studies and worked on the recording of characteristic objects and entities. He advocated indigenous construction and the incorporation of Bosnia's centuries-old tradition into contemporary architecture.

As a Representative at the Diet of Bosnia, Vancaš submitted to the Bosnian Parliament in 1911 a resolution in which these architects expressed their views on the architectural heritage in Bosnia and Herzegovina and proposals for the preservation and use of architectural landmarks. The Resolution called on the Land Government to take appropriate measures to list all older and public and private buildings and construction monuments, to place state monuments under the protection of the state, to draw these buildings with drawings and photographs, and to prepare a legal basis - for new buildings in the Bosnian style enjoyed benefits and tax breaks. The resolution itself did not produce some definite results, although it was accepted by the Government.

=== Josip Pospišil ===
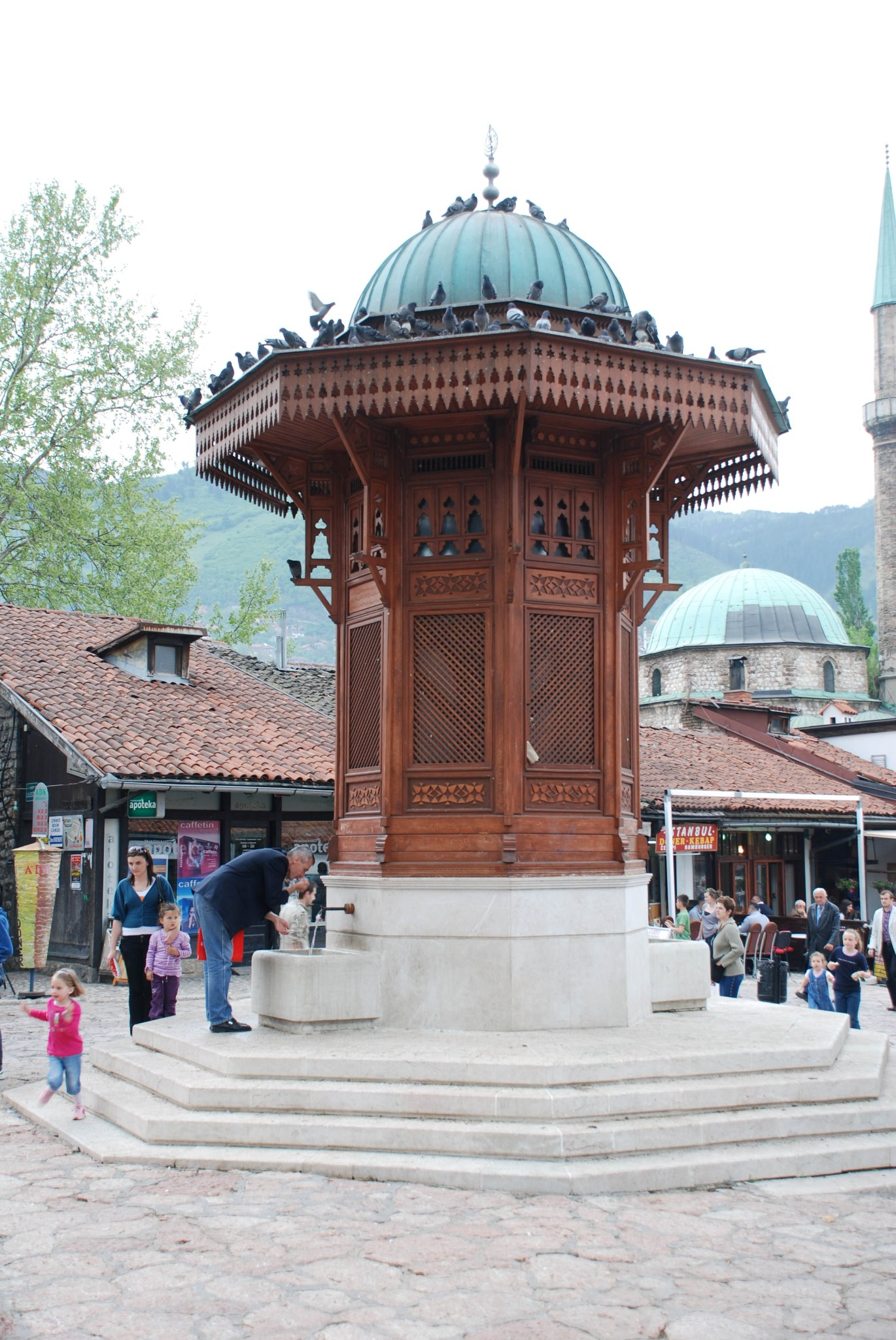
Pospišil's Sebilj in Baščaršija

In 1909, architect Josip Pospišil arrived in Sarajevo, and immediately began studying indigenous heritage in urbanism and architecture, fighting for their protection and restoration. He propagated the "Bosnian style", looking for models in his immediate vicinity.

Pospišil in 1912 appeared in the renowned magazine Der Bautechniker with several professional articles in which he also informs the foreign cultural public about the problems of current construction practice and theory in Bosnia and Herzegovina. Then he published several of his projects and, among them, a perspective view of the future building of the Sarajevo Fire Brigade barracks. Pospišil's 1912 Fire Brigade barracks was one key Bosnian Style public building actually built in the provincial capital. A mixture of modern styles, it had functionalist tendencies in its near lack of ornament, a façade organisation described as Secessionist in spirit, and an Expressionist depiction of both structure and function. It also had a roof profile and projecting wooden bay windows reminiscent of Bosnian vernacular architecture.

Pospišil's designs on the Radnik Pharmacy, a residential and commercial four-storey building in Tito's 34 (Salom Palace), Musafija Palace, Sebilj (public kiosk fountain) on Baščaršija Square, are examples of expansion of the Bosnian-style.

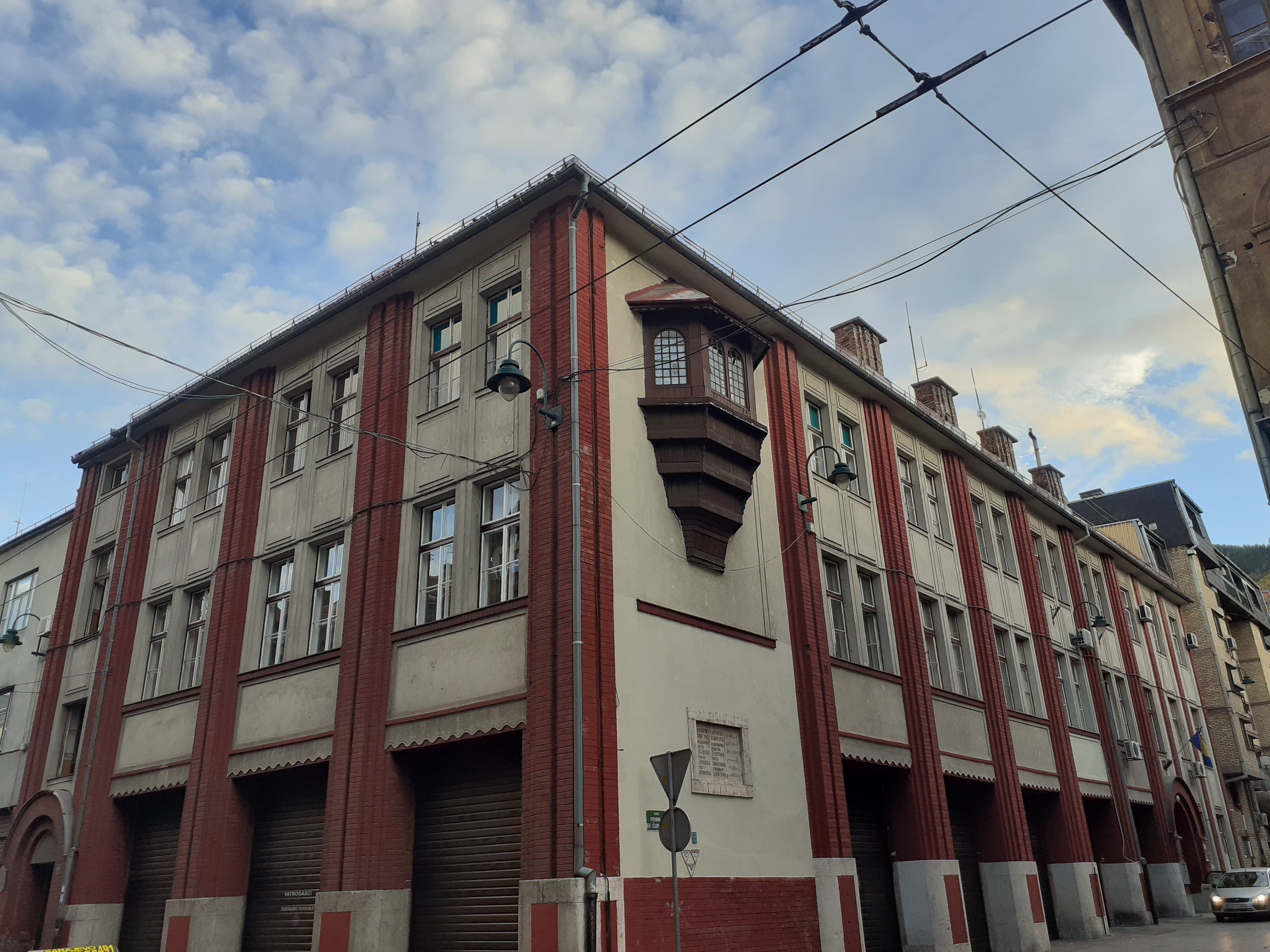
Pospišil's Sarajevo Fire Brigade barracks, 1912

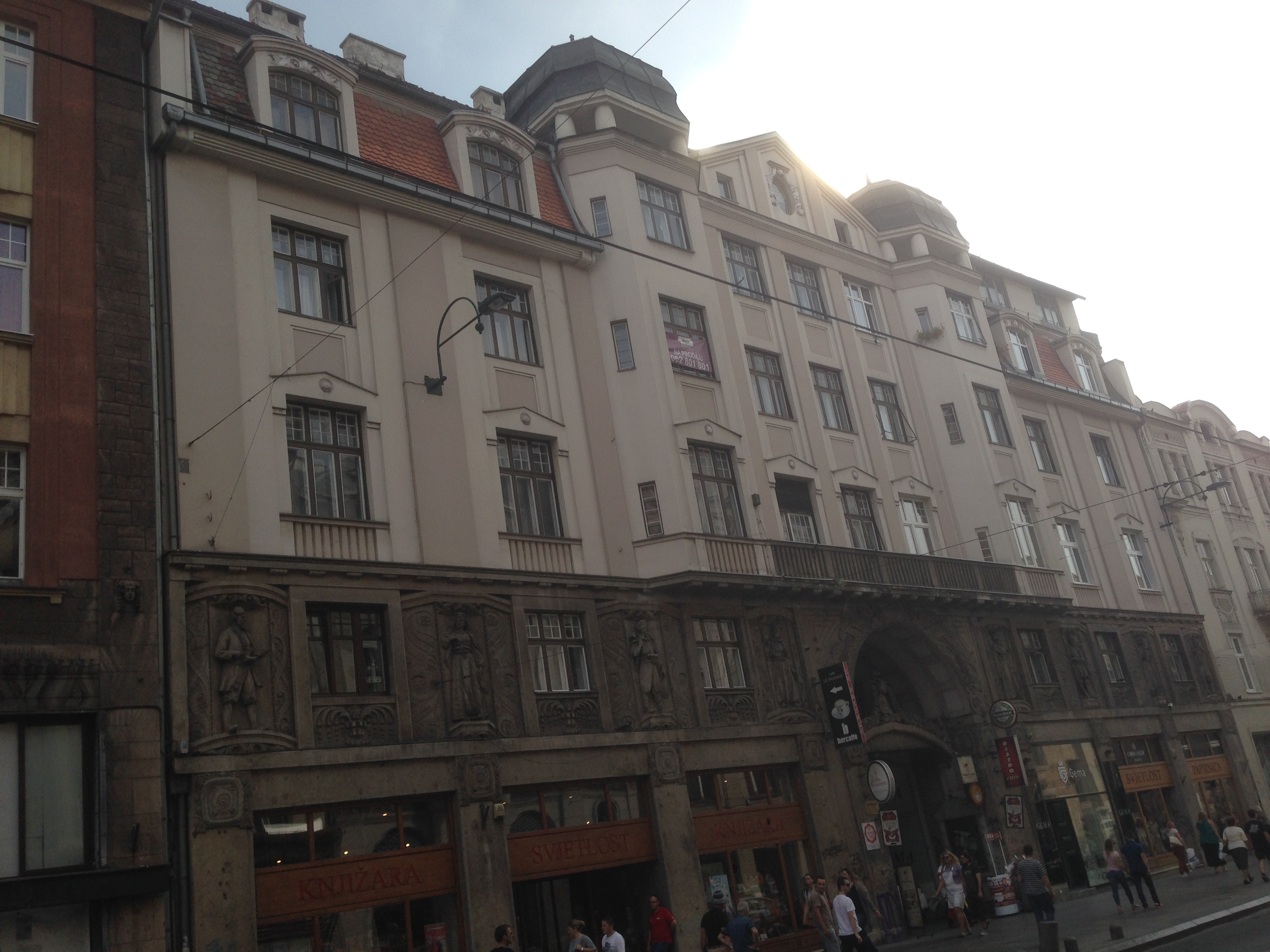
Salom Palace
(Titova 34)

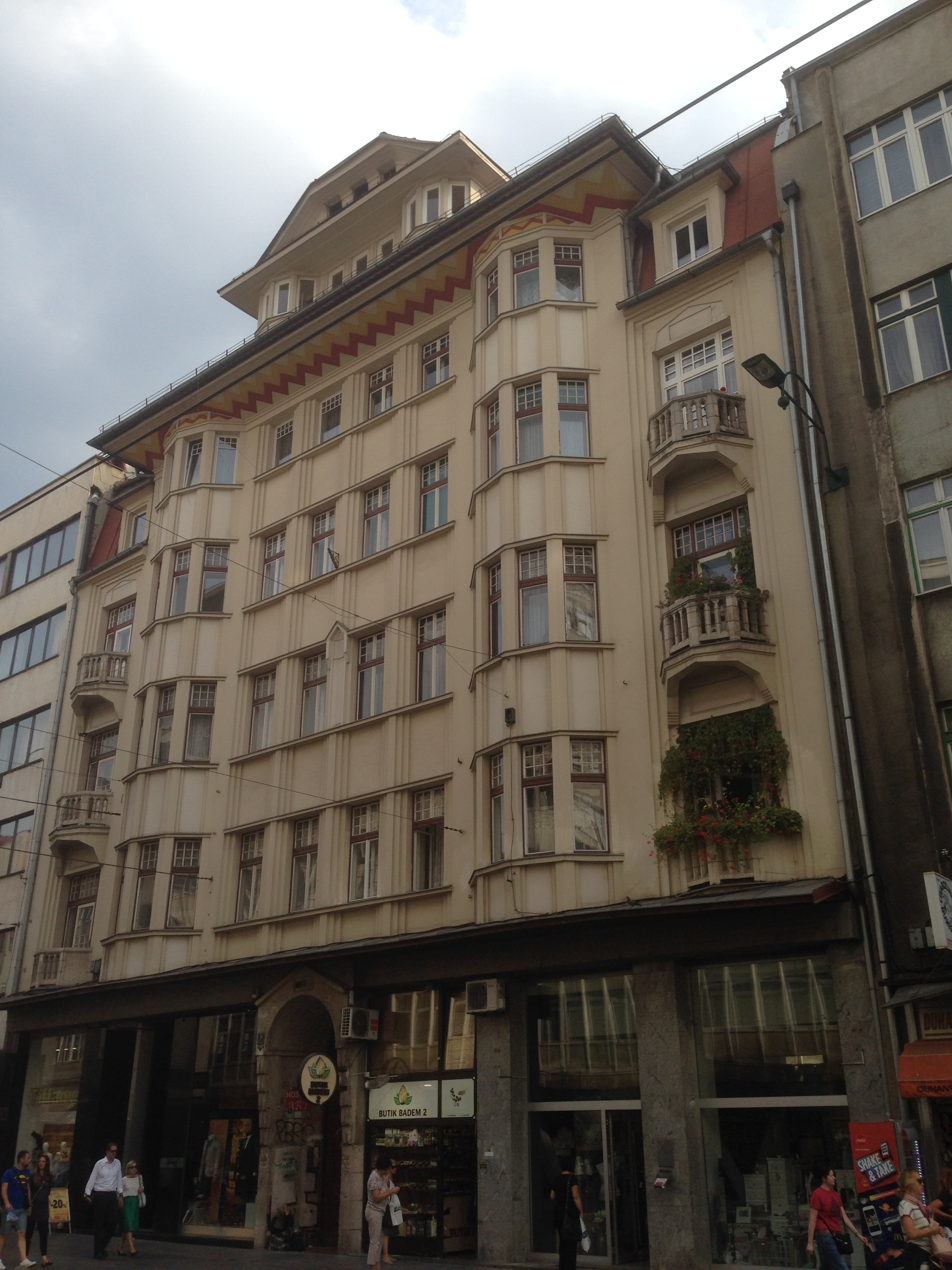
Musafija Palace

== Buildings ==
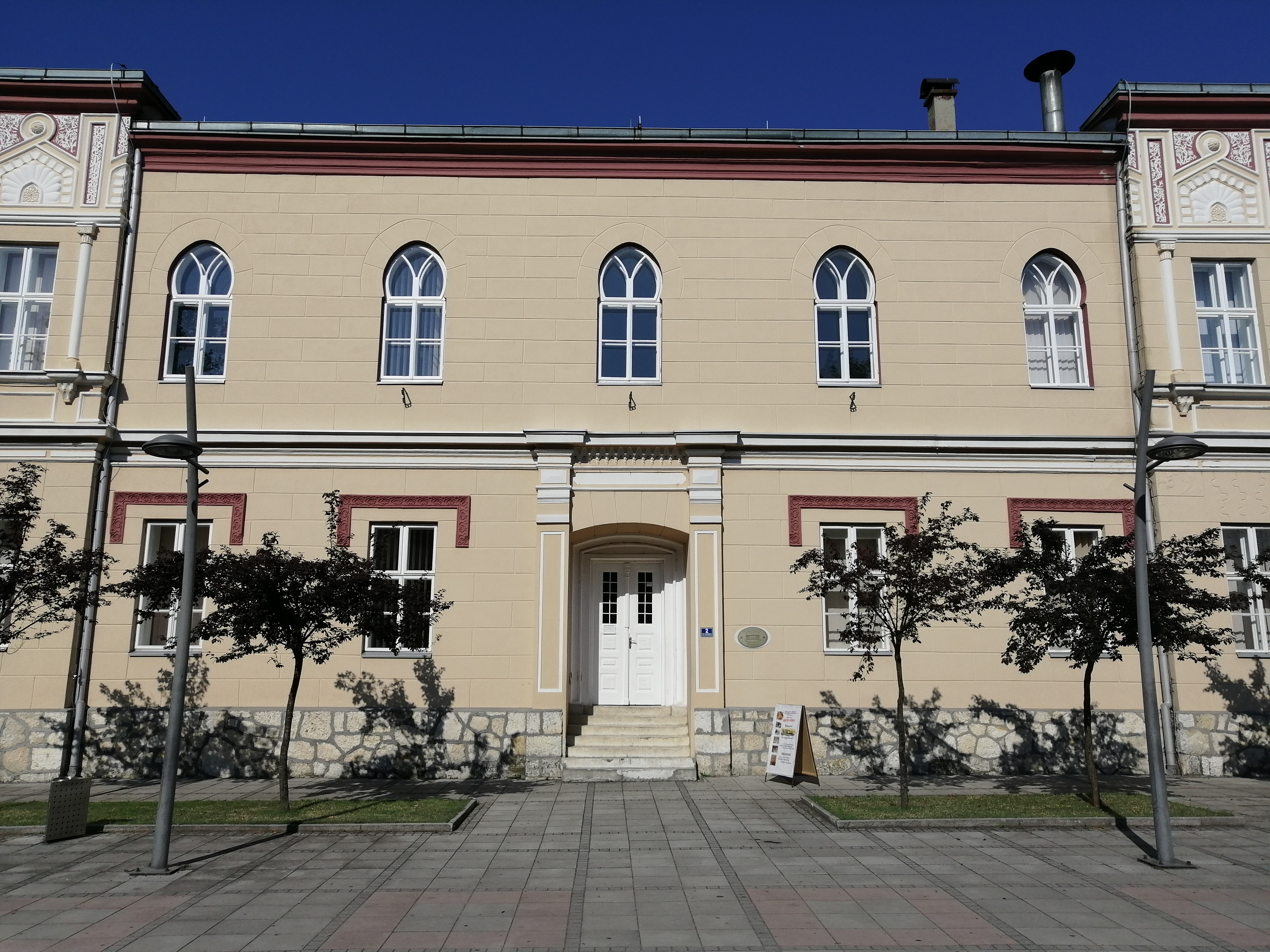
National Library, Derventa

- The building of the Land Waqf (Islamic Community of Bosnia and Herzegovina and the Waqf Directorate) and Hadim Ali-Pasha's Waqf.
- Mandic's summer house in Ilidza
- Husedžinović Family Building in Banja Luka from 1913.
- Hotel Stari Grad in Sarajevo. With this project, Vancaš makes a greater departure from the Vienna Secession principle of the facade organization, most notably in the freedom of rhythmization of the wall plans and forms of doxat. The central doxat is irregularly convex, two storeys in size, with the top all in wood and glass, like a divanhana at a Bosnian house. Angular doxate is a pentagonal plan.
- The residential-business corner of Baščaršija from 1911 is an expression of respect found with: a stone ground floor, rich doxata, attic windows with a classic broken arch, a closed fence and a pointed roof with a carved fringe. Other buildings on Baščaršija that were built before the First World War had emphasized elements of belonging to the architecture into which they were interpolated.
- The building of Hadin-Pasha's vakuf in formal elements bears all the features of a Bosnian house.
- Derventa Municipal Building and Derventa Royal Gymnasium Building
- Croatian home in Kiseljak
- Tešanj Credit Building

== See also ==
- Architecture of Bosnia and Herzegovina

== Bibliography ==
- Alija Bejtić - Ulice i trgovi Sarajeva. Sarajevo: Muzej grada Sarajeva 1973. Godine
- Borislav Spasojević - Arhitektura stambenih palata austrougarskog perioda u Sarajevu. Sarajevo: Svjetlost, 1988.
- Nedžad Kurto - Sarajevo 1492-1992, Oko, Sarajevo.
- Jela Božić, - Arhitekt Josip pl. Vancaš, Značaj i doprinos arhitekturi Sarajeva u periodu austrougarske uprave, doktorska disertacija, Sarajevo, 1989.
- Ibrahim, Krzović (1987). Arhitektura Bosne i Hercegovine 1878-1918. Umjetnicka galerija, 1987.
