= Rudolf Tönnies =

- Born: 20 April 1869; Ljubljana
- Died: 6 December 1929 (aged 60); Munich
- Occupation: Architect

Rudolf Tönnies was an Austro-Hungarian and Yugoslav architect and politician (councillor of the Drava Banovina), son of the Swedish industrialist Gustav Tönnies. Together with the Czech Josip Pospišil and the Austrian Ernst Lichtblau, who had all studied at the Art Academy in Vienna with Karl von Hasenauer and Otto Wagner, Tönnies is considered one of the proponents of the "Bosnian style" as a step towards architectural modernism in Bosnia and Herzegovina, as opposed to Moorish Revival style

== Biography ==
Rudolf Tönnies studied construction and civil engineering and worked for the Croatian government in Zagreb, then as lead architect for the Government of Bosnia and Herzegovina in Sarajevo, where he left among the most notable residential and mixed buildings in Vienna Secession style in town. In 1918 he returned to Ljubljana, obtained a trade concession (building master) and joined his brothers. In Ljubljana he built around 1923 the Credit Bank (today the seat of the National Bank) and at the same time the Ljubljana yard (headquarters of Railway Transport Company).

In 1898 he married Paula Faller (Ivanec, Varaždin, 22 August 1864); they had a daughter, Frigga Tönnies.

Tönnies also contributed to the Bosnian style in architecture, which can be compared with Scandinavian National Romanticism. The Bosnian Style was championed by a younger generation of architects, like Czech architect Josip Pospišil, Slovene architect Rudolf Tönnies, and Austrian architect Ernst Lichtblau, who all studied at the Art Academy in Vienna with Karl von Hasenauer and Otto Wagner. The style was, however, named by Sarajevo's senior architect, Josip Vancaš, for whom many of these younger architects worked.

== Works ==
- Palace of the Orthodox Metropolitan, Štrosmajerova 1 Sarajevo (1899)
- Villa Rädisch, Petrakijina 13 Sarajevo, 1906. This Vienna secession villa boasts a dense flower carpet.
- House of Milan Jojkić, Muvekita 8 Sarajevo, 1906. The partitioning of this façade is similar to that of the house that Tönnies designed for Mehmed-beg Fadilpašić some years later.
- Residential and commercial building on Zelenih beretki, Sarajevo 1907
- House of Mehmed-beg Fadilpašić, Franjevačka 2 Sarajevo, 1910. The undulating façade, the floral and geometric elements and the protruding roof show the influences of both Bosnian vernacular and Vienna Secession architecture.
- Building of Altarac Meyer, Ferhadija 22 Sarajevo, 1911. This building, an example of the geometric Art Nouveau, typical of the late period, also shows some influence of Neoclassicism.
- House of Atijas Mordohaj Rahae, Valtera Perića 4 Sarajevo 1911. This building has a notable corner solution with a dome.
- Bank on obala Kulina bana, Sarajevo 1913
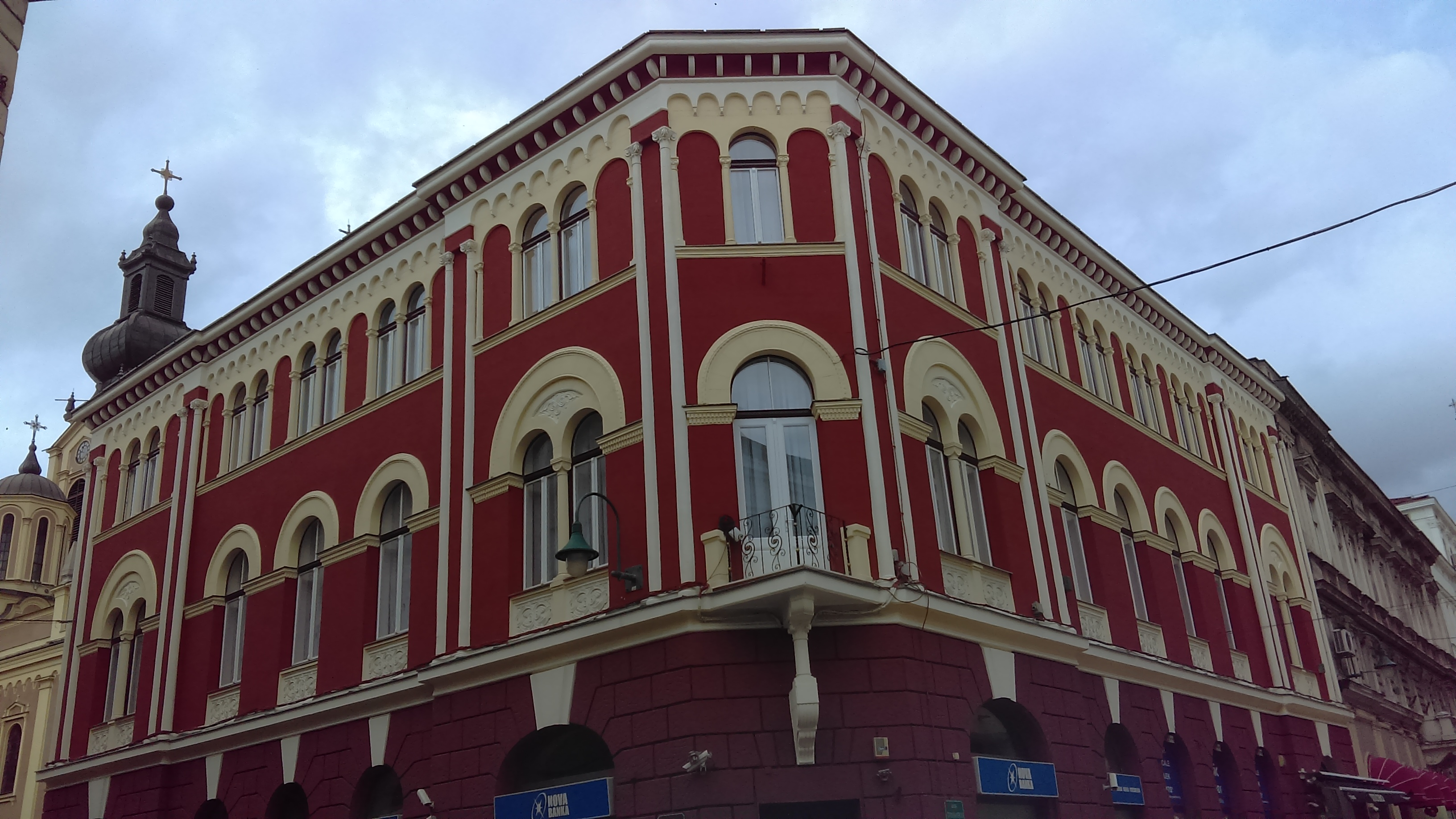
Palace of the Orthodox Metropolitan, Sarajevo, 1898-1899

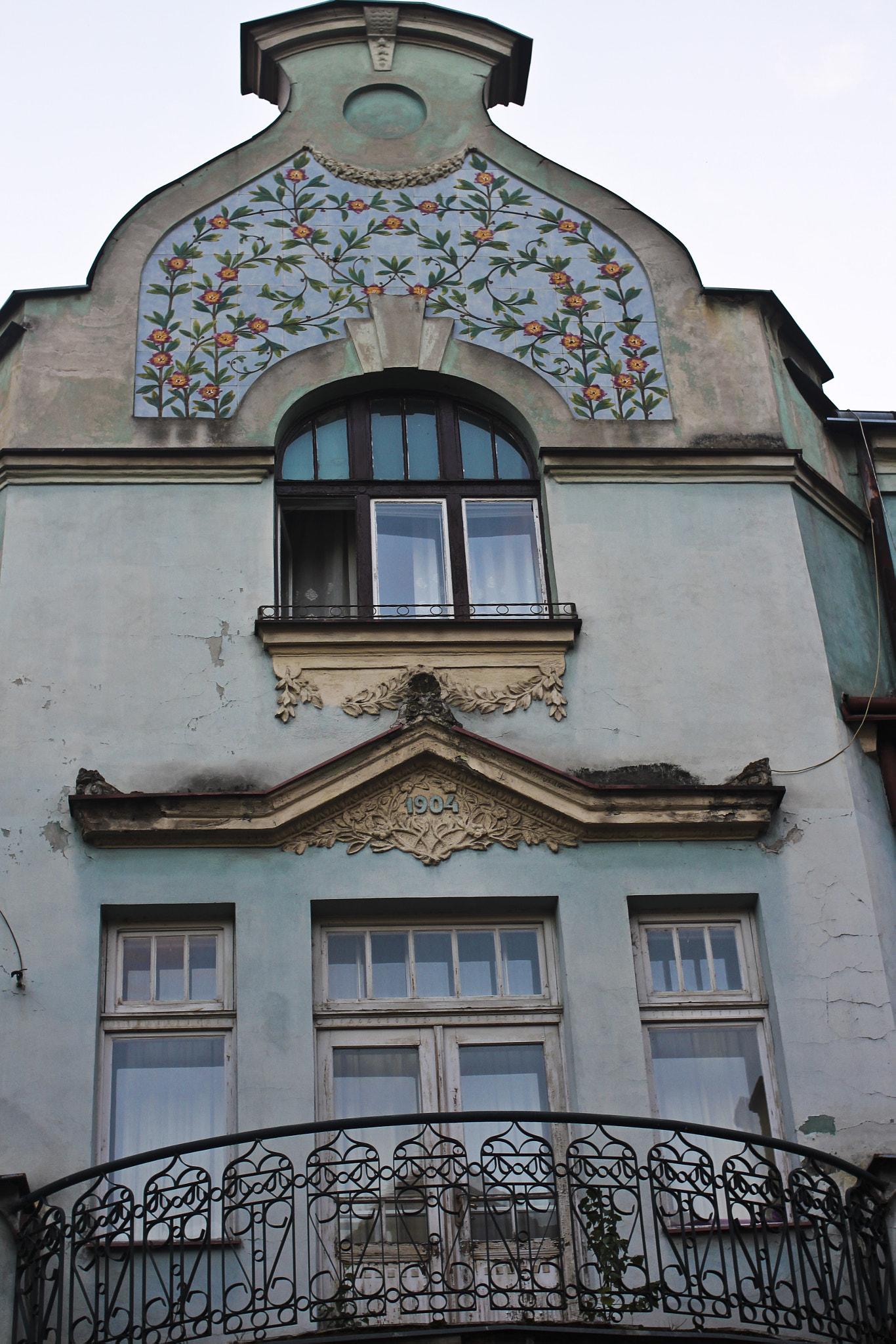
Villa Rädisch, Petrakijina 13 Sarajevo, 1906.

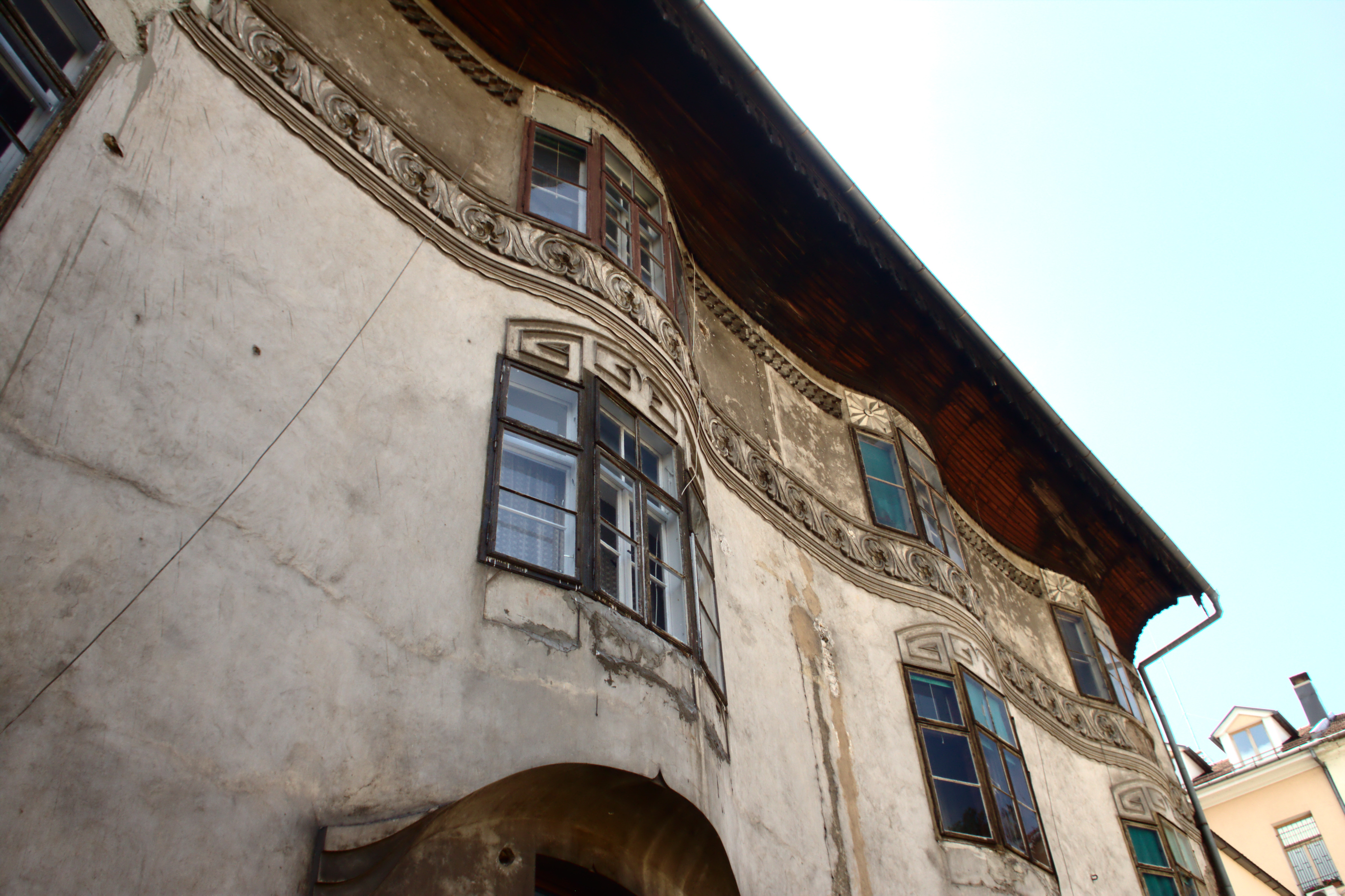
House of Mehmed-beg Fadilpašić, Franjevačka 2 Sarajevo, 1910.

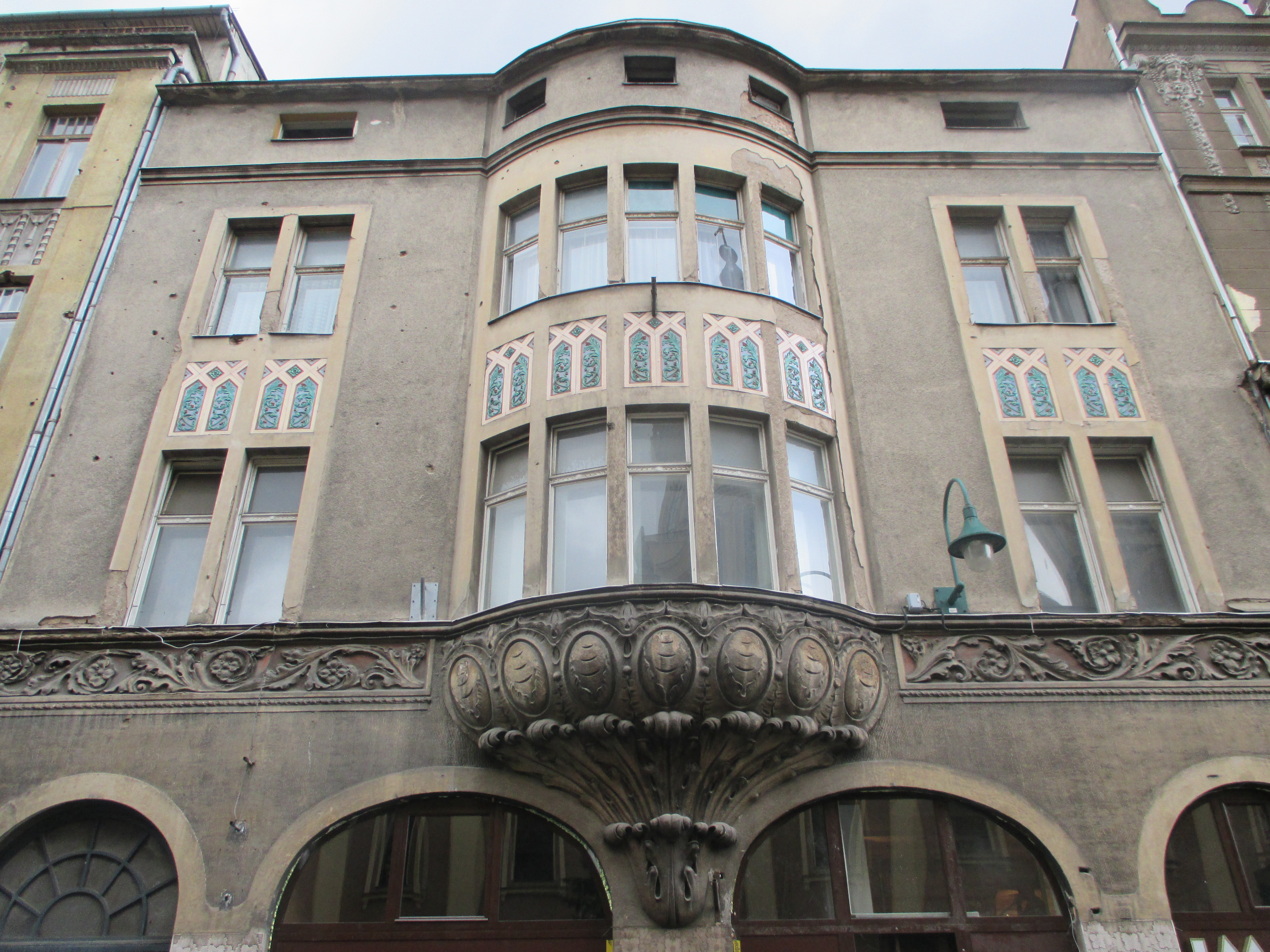
Residential and commercial building on Zelenih beretki, Sarajevo 1907

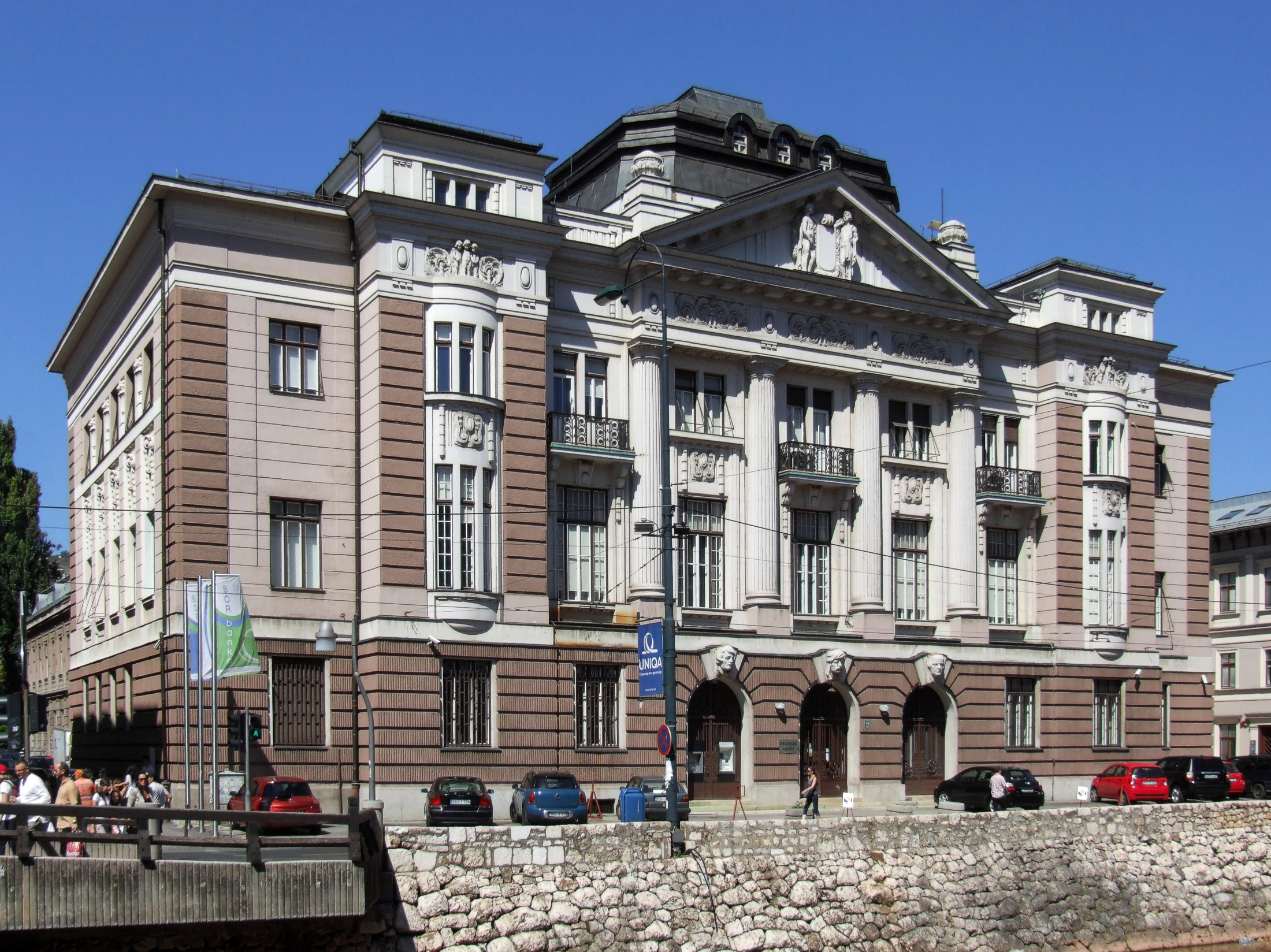
Bank on obala Kulina bana, Sarajevo 1913

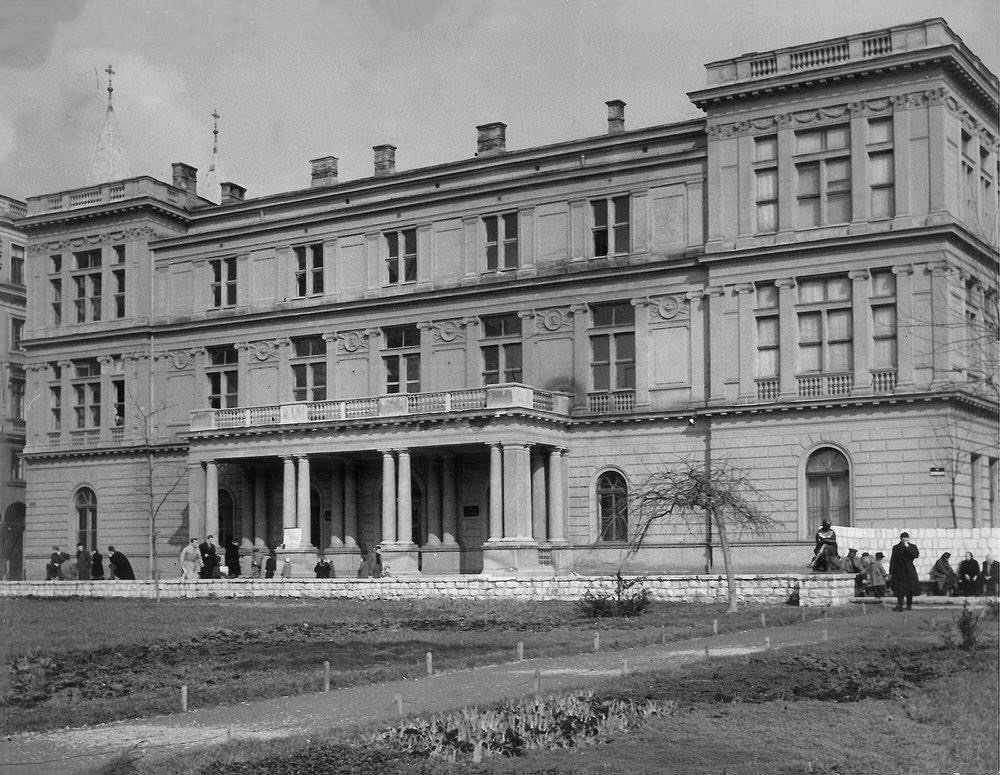
The building of the Orthodox seminary in the 1920s

== See also ==
- František Blažek
- Karel Pařík
- Josip Vancaš

== Bibliography ==
- Slovenski biografski leksikon 1925-1991.(2009). Elektronska izdaja. Ljubljana: SAZU
- Enciklopedija Slovenije; knjiga 13, Mladinska knjiga, Ljubljana, 1999
