= Koseze Pond =

Artificial pond in Ljubljana, Slovenia

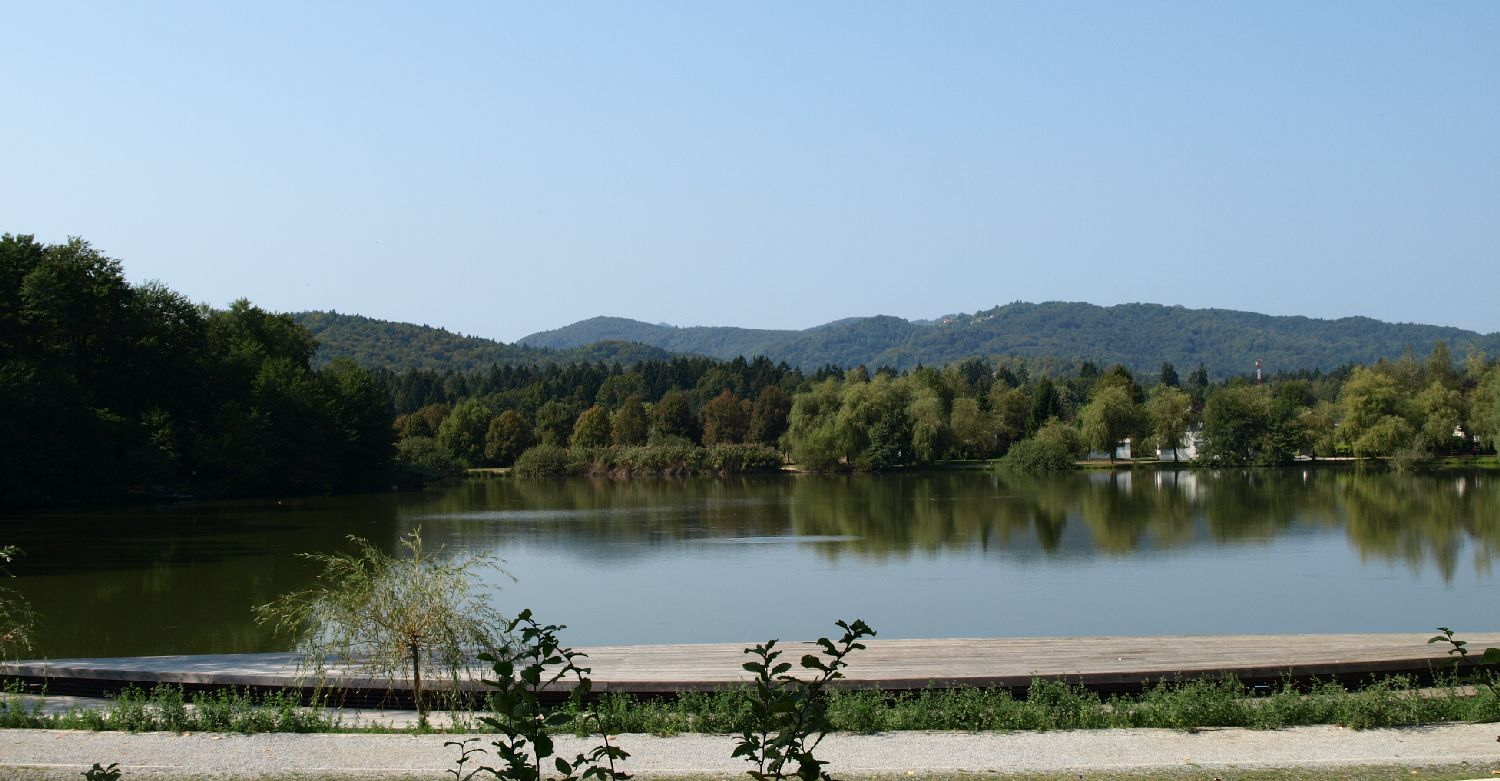
- Koseze Pond

- Location within Slovenia
- Location: Šiška District, City Municipality of Ljubljana, Slovenia
- Coordinates: 46°4′2.35″N 14°28′7.76″E
- Type: artificial pond
- Primary inflows: Mostec Creek
- Basin countries: Slovenia
- Surface area: 3.8 ha (9.4 acres)
- Max. depth: 2–3 m (6 ft 7 in – 9 ft 10 in)

Koseze Pond (Slovene: Koseški bajer), Martinek Pond (Martinek bajer), Lake Koseze (Koseško jezero) or simply the Pond (Bajer) is an artificial pond at the edge of Ljubljana, the capital of Slovenia, between Šiška Hill to the west and the neighborhood of Mostec to the east. It is part of the Tivoli–Rožnik Hill–Šiška Hill Landscape Park and is named after the nearby Koseze neighborhood in Ljubljana's Šiška District. Near Koseze Pond, the Path of Remembrance and Comradeship touches Tivoli–Rožnik Hill–Šiška Hill Landscape Park.

The pond has an area of 3.8 hectares (9.4 acres) and a maximum depth of 2–3 metres (6 ft 7 in – 9 ft 10 in). It is fed by Mostec Creek. It was created after a former clay pit at the site, which supplied the brickworks operated by Gustav Tönnies (1814–1886), was closed. The pit was then overgrown by grass, but the Agrostroj company later flooded the area to test irrigation pumps.

Koseze Pond is now used as a recreation area by local residents. In the summer it is used for racing radio-controlled model boats and fishing. Swimming is prohibited due to the poor quality of the water, which is also contaminated by cyanobacteria. In the winter it is used for skating. Koseze Pond is a natural habitat for the edible frog, migrant hawker, common bulrush, and common reed. It is also the nesting place of the common moorhen, the mute swan and other bird species.

Koseze Pond is featured in the novel Ne bom se več drsal na bajerju (I Will No Longer Skate on the Pond), which was awarded the Kresnik prize, the most prestigious prize for novels in Slovenia, in June 2023. The novel was written by Lado Kralj and awarded posthumously. It takes place in Ljubljana during the Italian occupation in the early 1940s and in the post-war period in the 1950s. It focuses on the Šiška District of Ljubljana, where a young man working for the Communists falls in love with a student at the monastery boarding school, a woman who is also the love interest of an Italian officer.

== See also ==
- Tivoli Pond, another pond in the Tivoli–Rožnik Hill–Šiška Hill Landscape Park

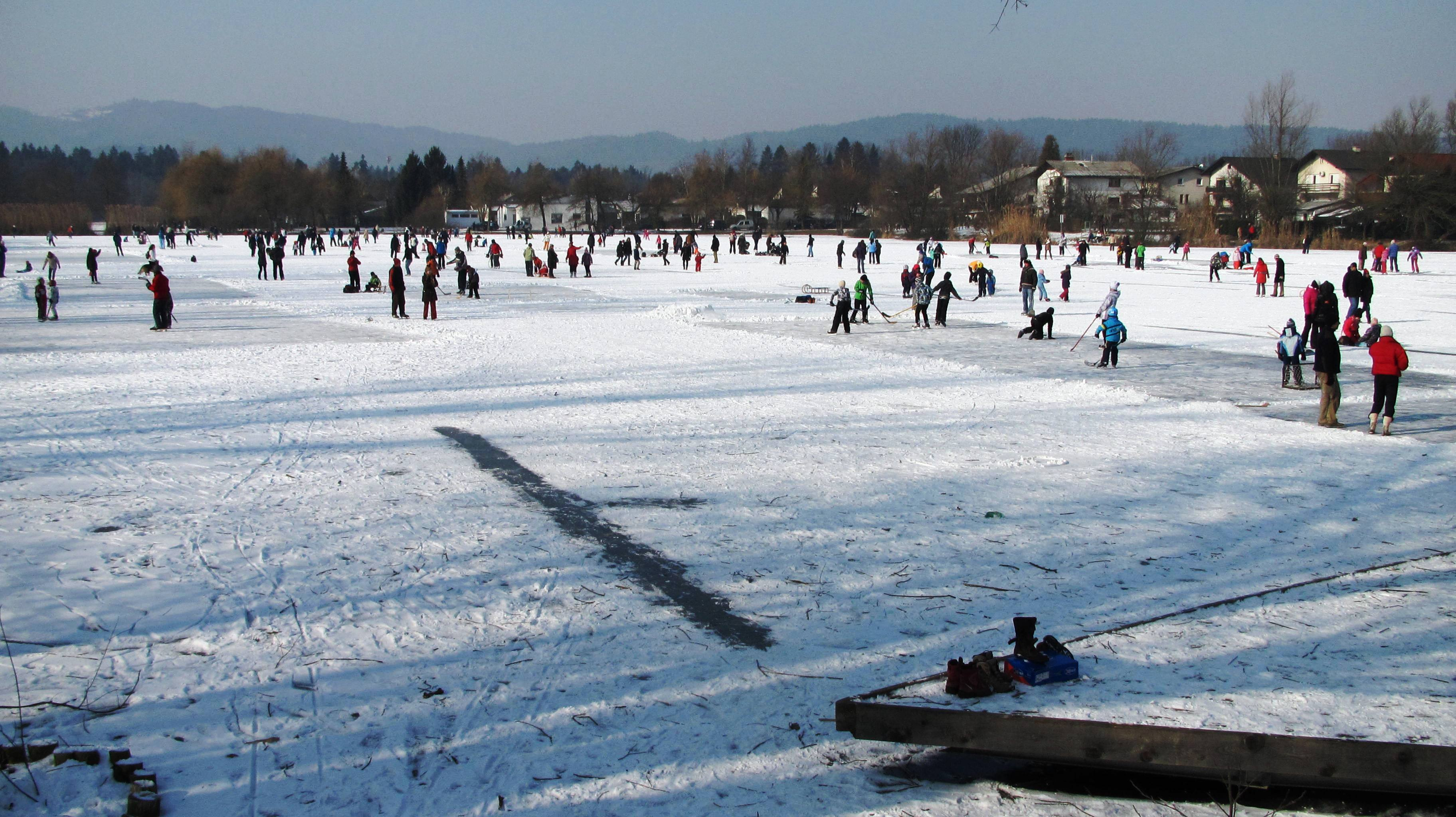
Skating takes place on Koseze Pond in winter.
