= Franz Lichtblau =

German architect (1928–2019)

- Born: 1928; Bad Tölz, Bayern, Germany
- Died: 2019 (aged 91); Munich, Germany
- Education: Technical University of Karlsruhe, Technical University of Munich
- Occupation: Architect
- Buildings: Emmauskirche, Immanuelkirche, Johanneskirche, Michaelskapelle, Philippuskirche, Zachäuskirche

Franz Lichtblau (1928 – 2019) was a German architect.

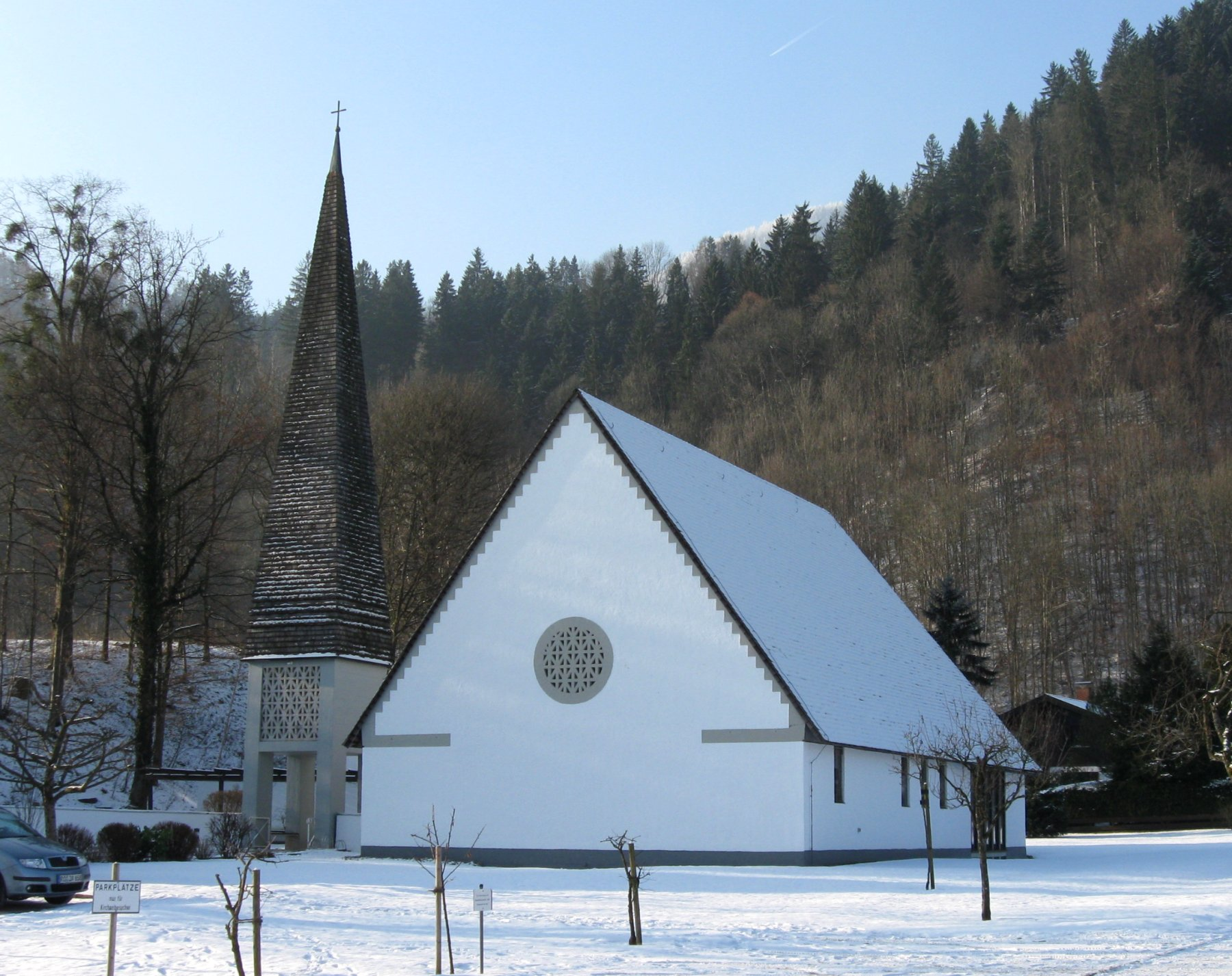
Protestant church of the Resurrection in Oberaudorf (1957–1958), since 1999 under monument protection

Lichtblau studied after his Abitur 1946 and after an apprenticeship as a carpenter with Egon Eiermann at the Technical University of Karlsruhe as well as with Robert Vorhoelzer, Martin Elsaesser, Hermann Leitenstorfer and Hans Döllgast at the Technical University of Munich. In 1956 he took part in a competition for the Protestant Church in Oberaudorf am Inn, which he won. Subsequently, he established a number of Protestant churches in Upper Bavaria and from 1962 also in Würzburg, Coburg, Erlangen, Augsburg, Bamberg and Kempten. In addition, he undertook numerous monumental renovations in Nördlingen, Memmingen, Lindau, Schweinfurt and Amberg. In partnership with Ludwig J. N. Bauer (1929–2003), social buildings, kindergartens, student residences, facilities for the disabled, old people's and nursing homes, residential buildings, city extensions as well as industrial and commercial buildings were also built. Lichtblau often worked together with the church painter Hubert Distler. In addition to Olaf Andreas Gulbransson, Gustav Gsaenger and Reinhard Riemerschmid, who died at an early age, Lichtblau had a decisive influence on Protestant church architecture in Bavaria in the second half of the 20th century. Many of the churches that Lichtblau created are built over a polygonal ground plan. Most of them have a freestanding tower.

== Buildings (selection) ==
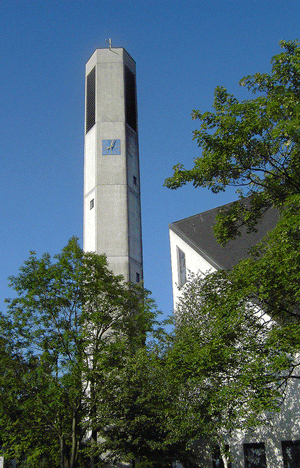
Immanuelkirche in Munich (2004)

- Church of the Resurrection in Gartenstadt Keesburg, Würzburg
- Conversion of the Max barracks into 50 social housing units (Lindau Island, 1989)
- Emmauskirche in Munich (1964)
- Extension of the church of the Resurrection by Olaf Andreas Gulbransson in Neufahrn (Landkreis Freising) by Community hall and parsonage (1972, with Ludwig Bauer)
- Extension of the reconciliation church in Neunburg vorm Wald (1966–1968)
- Immanuelkirche in Munich (1965–1966)
- Johanneskirche in Alterlangen (1963–1964)
- Michaelskapelle in Dietramszell (1961)
- New choir centre for the Windsbacher Knabenchor (1974 by competition)
- Pfennigparade in Munich-Schwabing (Bauabschnitt 3: Behinderten- und Personalwohnungen, Gewerbetrakt, 1976)
- Philippuskirche in Munich (1964)
- Protestant church in Übersee (on heptagonal ground plan, 1965)
- Protestant church of the Resurrection in Oberaudorf (1957–1958), since 1999 under monument protection
- Reconstruction and extension of social homes of the Rummelsberger Diakonie (Schloss Ditterswind etc.)
- St.-Andreas Church in Augsburg (1966–1967)
- Redesign of the Johanneskirche in Bad Tölz (1970)
- Zachäuskirche in Sauerlach (1963)

== Literature ==
- Andreas Hildmann (Hrsg.): Kleine Kirchen von Franz Lichtblau. Eine Werkliste. Kunstverlag Josef Fink, Lindenberg 2013, ISBN 978-3-89870-832-6.
