= Koseze (Ljubljana) =

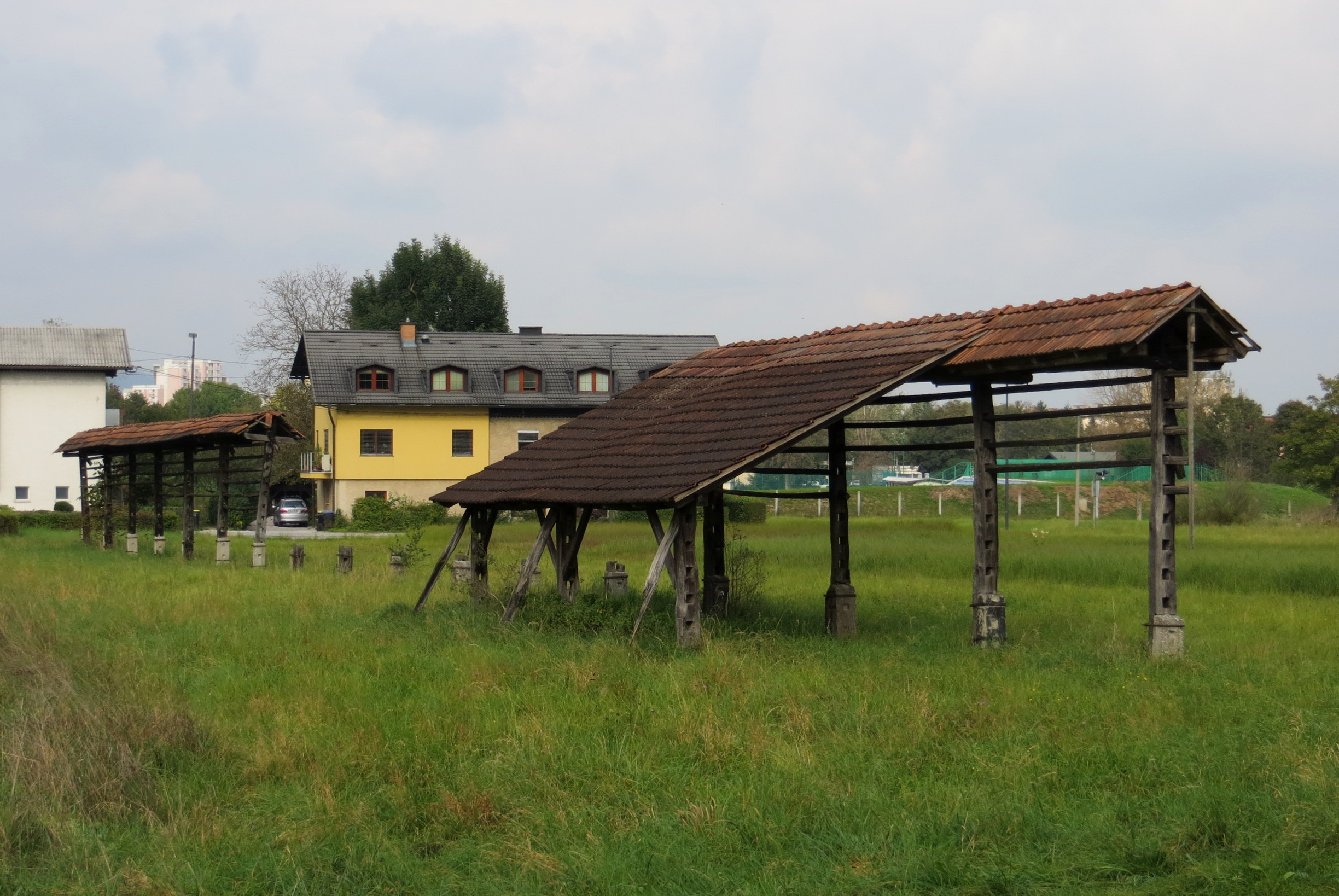

- Location in Slovenia
- Coordinates: 46°4′8″N 14°28′30″E
- Country: Slovenia
- Traditional region: Upper Carniola
- Statistical region: Central Slovenia
- Municipality: Ljubljana
- Elevation: 308 m (1,010 ft)

Koseze (pronounced [kɔˈseːzɛ]; German: Koßes) is a formerly independent settlement in the northwest part of the capital Ljubljana in central Slovenia. It is part of the traditional region of Upper Carniola and is now included with the rest of the municipality in the Central Slovenia Statistical Region.

== Geography ==
Koseze stands on clay soil beyond the gravelly terrace of the Sava River. Koseze Pond in the village is a former clay pit that supplied the brickworks operated by Gustav Tönnies (1814–1886) and was later flooded by the Agrostroj company to test irrigation pumps. Meadows and woods lie southwest of Koseze.

== Name ==
Koseze was attested in 1414 as Edlingen (and as Edling in 1428 and zu Kasess in 1499). The name is originally an accusative plural demonym from the common noun *kosez, referring to lesser Slavic nobility. The settlement was formerly known as Koßes in German.

== History ==
In the 1900 census, Koseze had a population of 257 living in 34 houses. By 1931, the population had increased to 680 in 97 houses. Koseze was annexed by the City of Ljubljana in 1935, ending its existence as an independent settlement.

== Church ==
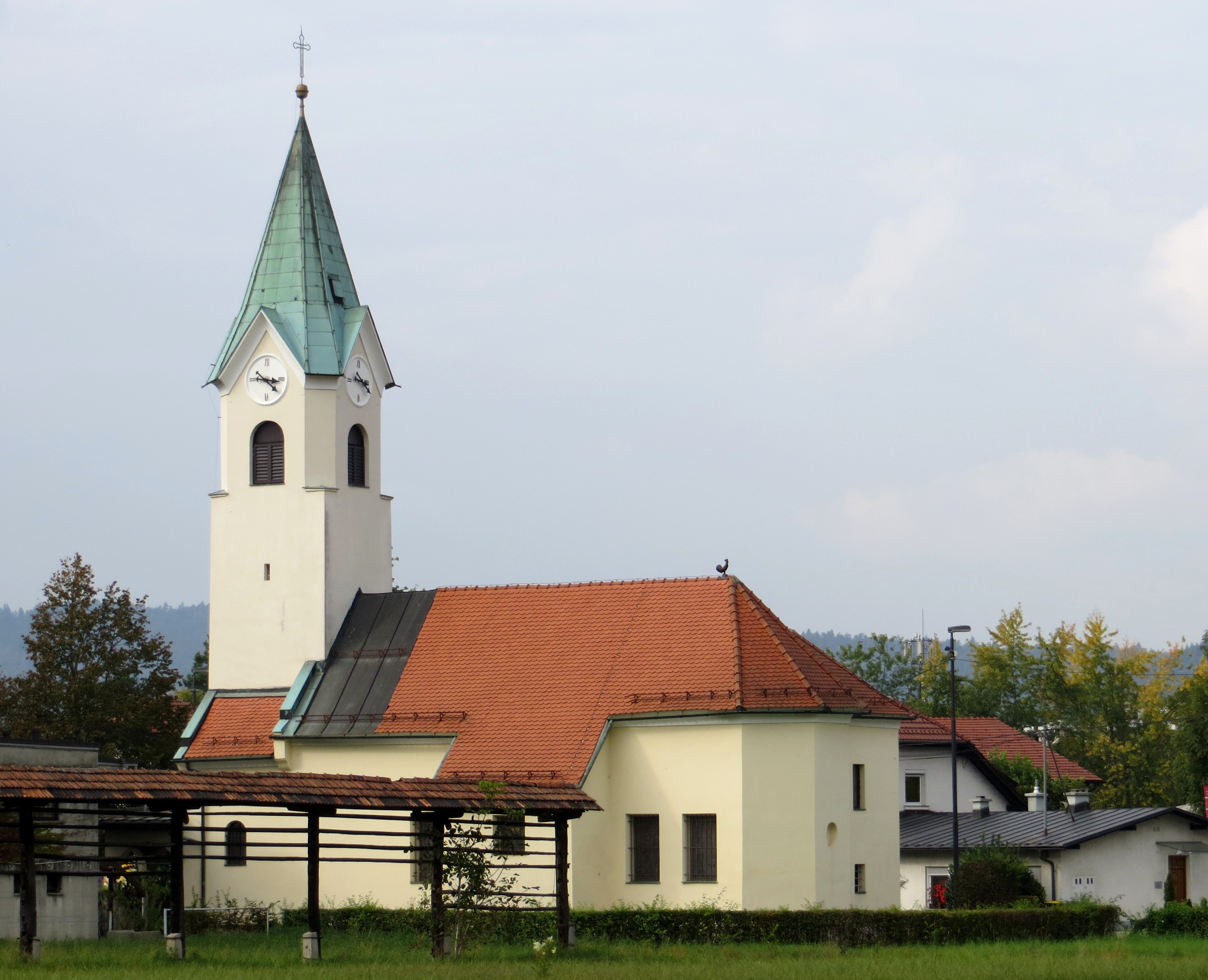
Divine Savior Church

There are two church buildings in Koseze. The older structure, originally dedicated to Saint Margaret, is one of the oldest churches in the immediate Ljubljana area and dates back at least to the 14th century and the exterior has frescoes dating to the first half of the 15th century. A bell tower was added to the church in 1708, and the building was badly damaged in the 1895 Ljubljana earthquake. The church was repaired between 1907 and 1908. Ljubljana–Koseze became a parish in 1961, when it was separated from the Parish of Šentvid, and the church was rechristened as Divine Savior Church. The interior of the church was renovated by the architect Anton Bitenc (1920–1977) circa 1973. The medieval church was too small to serve the needs of the parish, and so a larger church was built next to it from 1972 to 1974. Dedicated to the Virgin Mary, this was the first church built in Ljubljana after the Second World War. The new church was designed by Anton Bitenc with extensive stained glass by Stane Kregar (1905–1973).
