= Gustav Tönnies =

Swedish and Austro-Hungarian carpenter, architect and industrialist

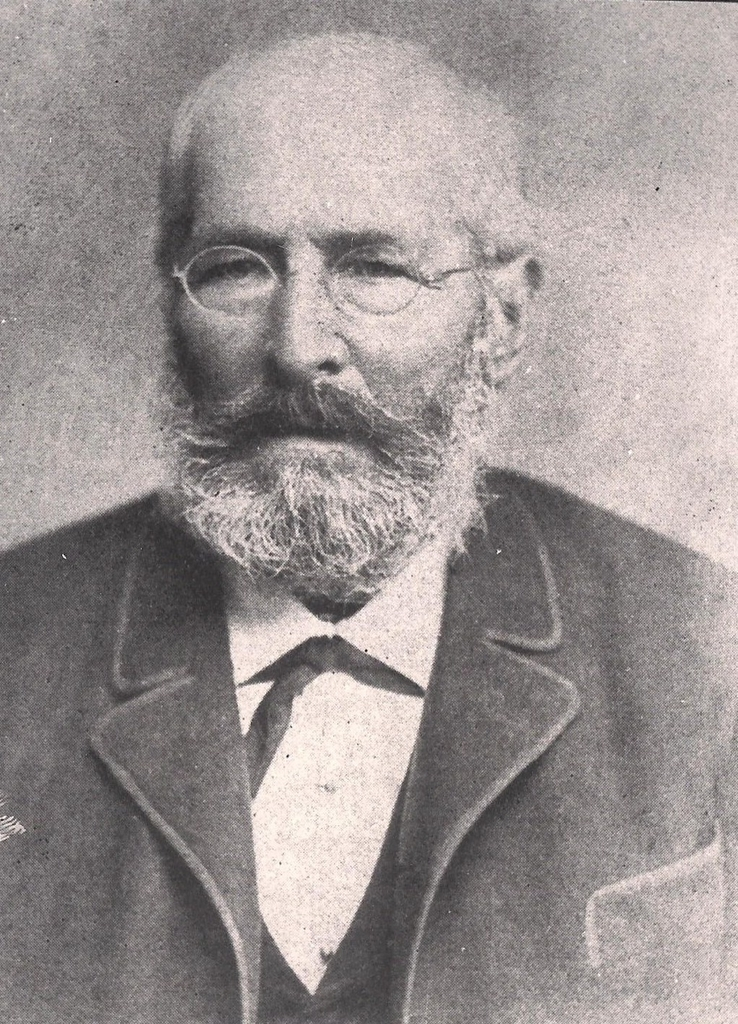
- Born: January 16, 1814; Stralsund, Swedish Pomerania
- Died: November 12, 1886 (aged 72); Ljubljana, Austria-Hungary.
- Occupations: architect and industrialist
- Spouse: Amalija Malovrh
- Relatives: Rudolf Tönnies, Ferdinand Tönnies

Gustav Johann Ludvik Tönnies (January 16, 1814 – November 12, 1886) was a Swedish and Austro-Hungarian carpenter, architect and industrialist, who lived most of his life in Ljubljana.

During the period of the great social and economic change in Europe, Gustav Tönnies and his nine sons were among some of the most famous and respected industrialists, architects and builders of Ljubljana (from 1845 to 1936). They were one of the most economically active families who helped to create an industrial revolution in Slovenian towns and cities and made a significant contribution to the historical records which include the fact that the land of Carniola was ranked as one of the most developed European provinces and which also influenced the development of the cities of Trieste, Sarajevo and Zagreb.

== Biography ==
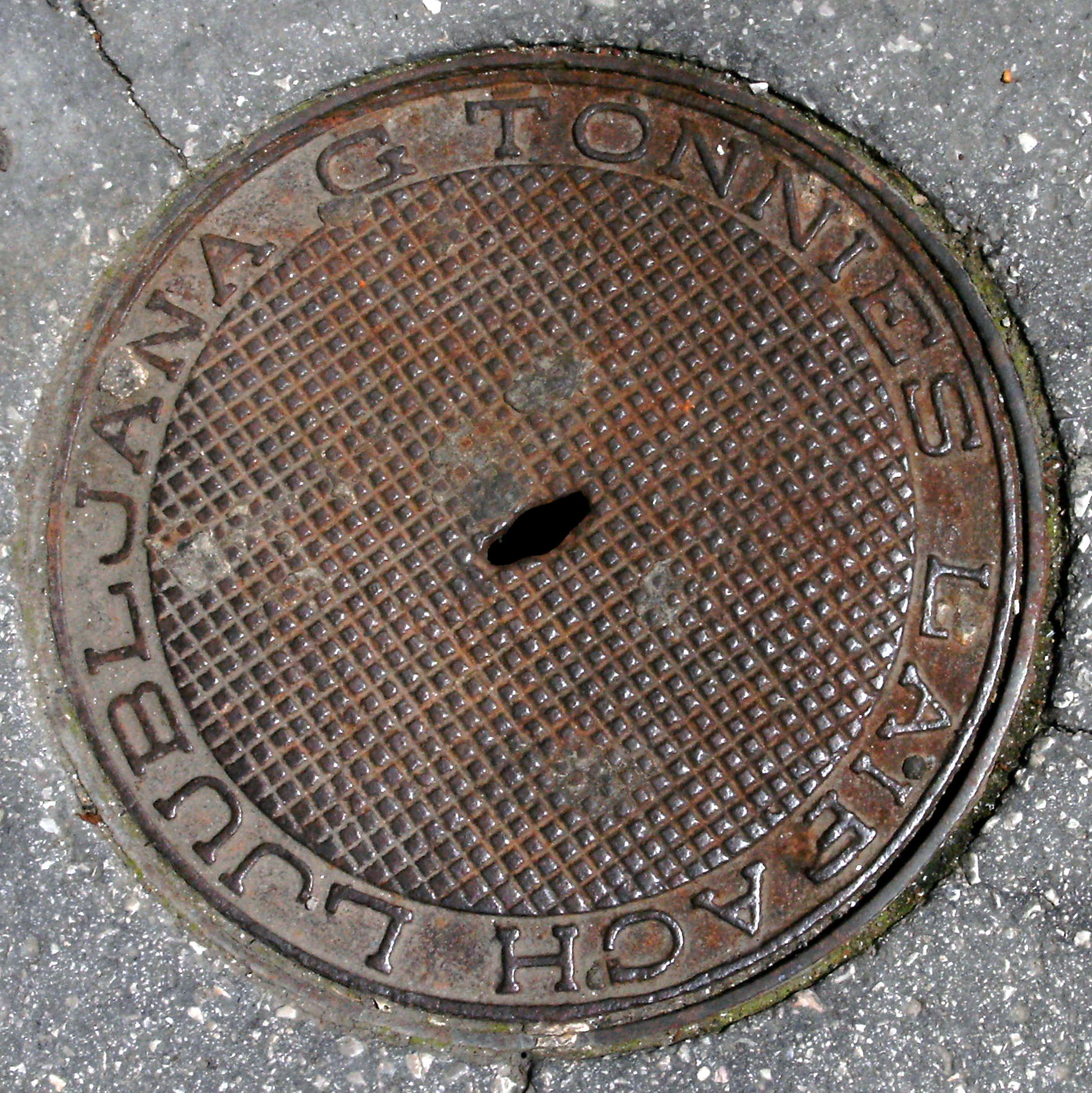
Tönnies manhole in Ljubljana

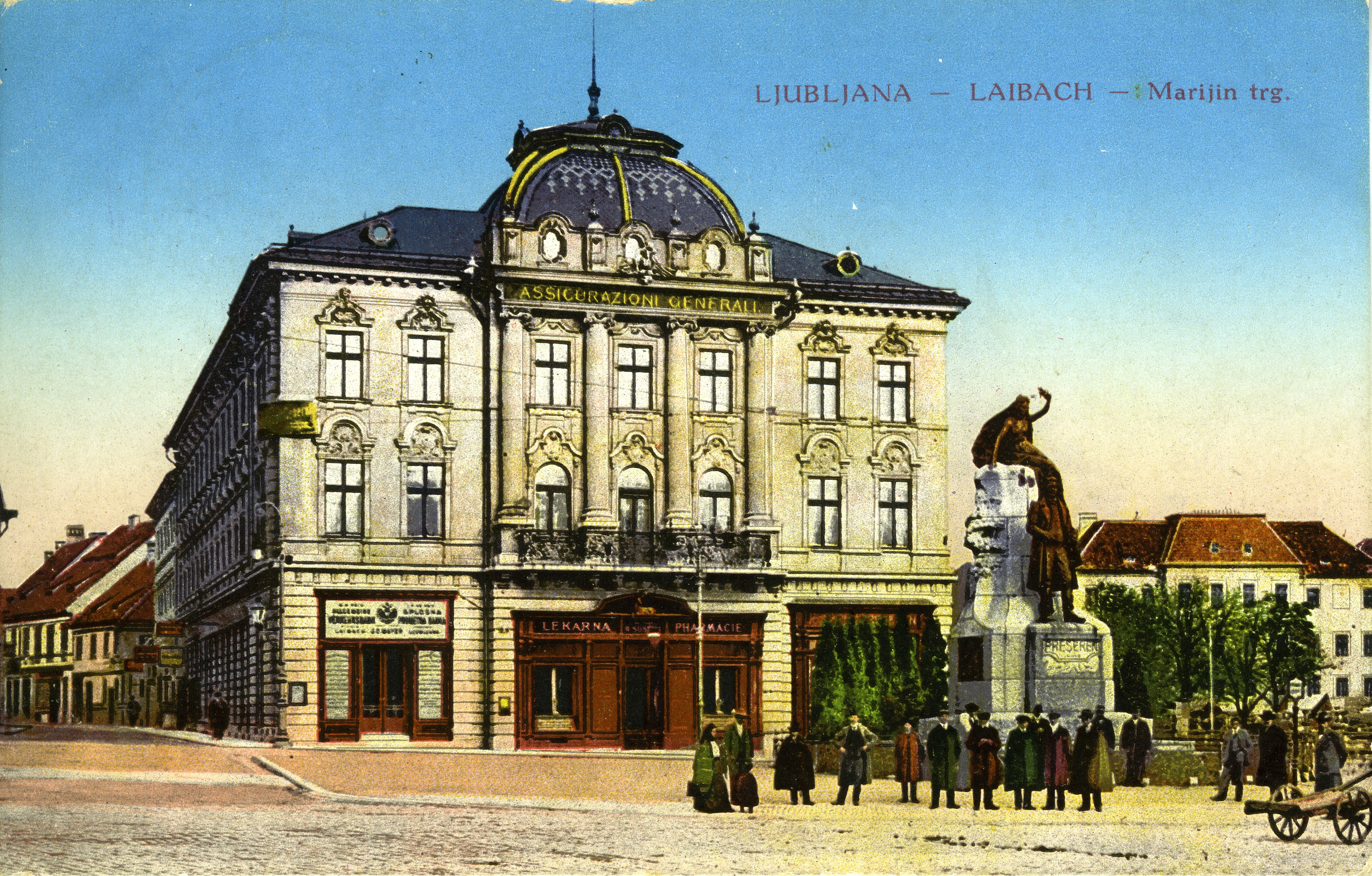
Ljubljana Central Pharmacy in 1917

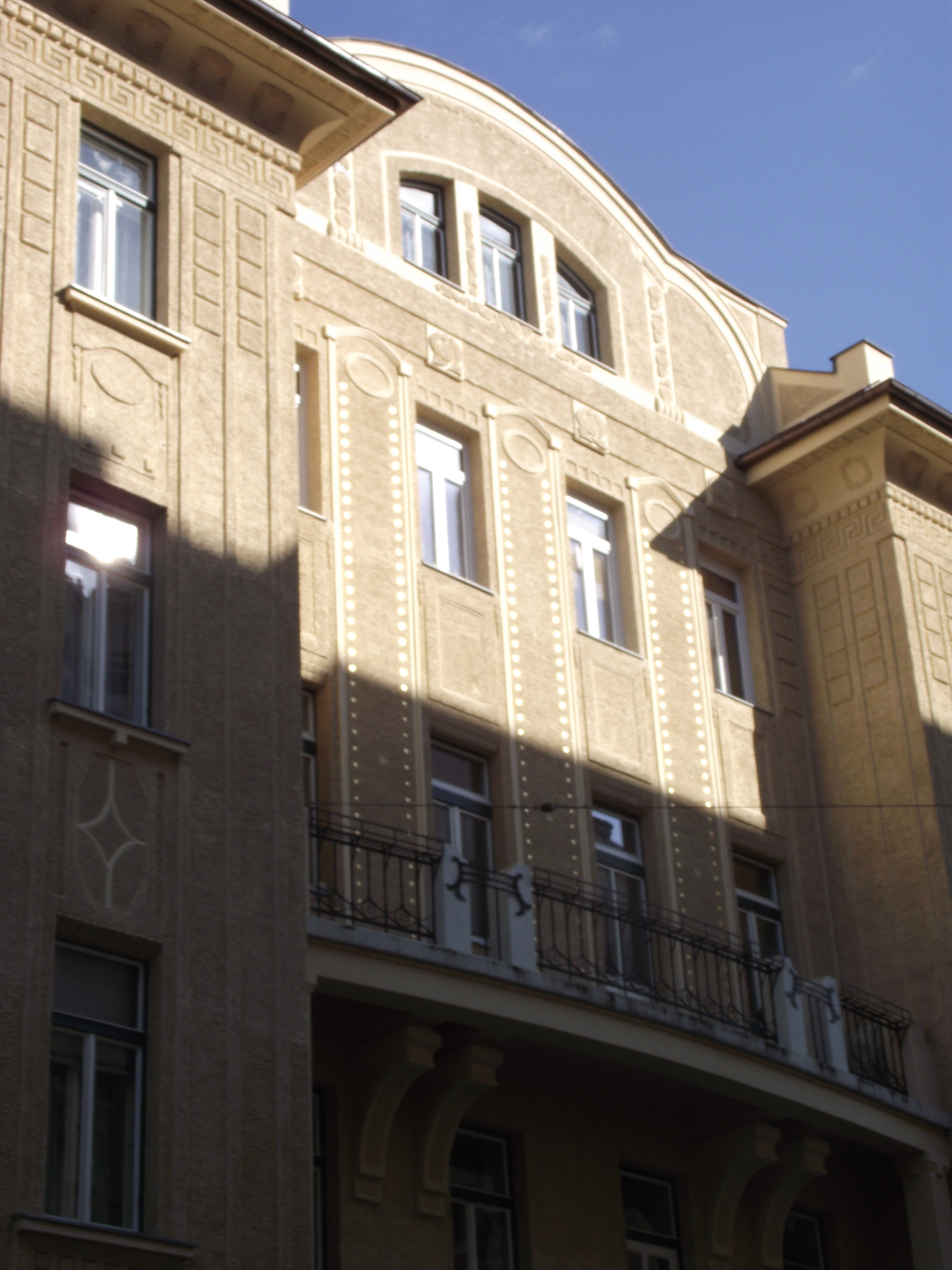
Župančičeva 8 building in Ljubljana

Gustav Tönnies was born in Sweden, where he studied carpentry and worked as an apprentice in several European cities. In 1845, he was sent from Graz to Ljubljana to work on the construction of the roof of Kolizej, at the time one of the largest buildings in this part of Europe. Because the completed work was to an exceptionally high standard, Ljubljana Major Johann Nepomuk Hradeczky offered Gustav Tönnies the position of city carpenter. Because of this, he established his own company, which soon expanded to include other aspects of the building and construction industry: the production of various materials, machinery, and a foundry which were required for the advancement of his building business.

Gustav Tönnies participated in the construction of the railway stations on the Celje – Ljubljana – Trieste route and later from Ljubljana to Treviso. He also took over the renovations and re-construction of various industrial buildings in Ljubljana which included: Madil textile factory; Cukrarna sugar refinery on Poljan in 1858, Kozler brewery in Sisak (now named Union) in 1866; Tschinkel & son confectionary and coffee substitute factory in 1871 (today Titus); Tobacco factory (later named Tobačna). In Trieste, he also constructed warehouses at the port and the main railway station where the first train arrived from Ljubljana on July 17, 1857.

Gustav Tönnies acquired quarries in Nabrežina, Repentabor and Momjan. He also founded the factory Strojne Tovarne in Livarne Šiška and a brickworks in Koseze (which had the first circular furnace). In 1871 he joined company with F. Dobner, formerly directors of the ironworks at Dvor at Žužemberk, and in addition to building locksmithing, he also established an iron foundry and machine workshop; In 1880 Dobner exited the company, and Tönnies remained the sole owner of the "Gustav Tönnies machine shop and iron foundry". In particular, he made machinery for the wood industry and crafts, vacuum cleaners, turbines and steam engines.

In 1895, an earthquake struck Ljubljana and the Tönnies Company was a great asset to the rebuilding of the city supplying the much needed construction materials for the building projects in progress. This dedicated engineer received an award from Emperor Franz Joseph on the 600th anniversary of the accession of Carniola to the Habsburg Monarchy. At the time of his death in 1886, the Tönnies establishments employed 650 people.

The Tönnies sons continued their father's legacy and built the court palace; a town hall; a gymnasium; the Mladika complex; the Catholic printing house (today the Faculty of Law); the Jakopič Pavilion in Tivoli Park; the Yugoslav Credit Bank (now the Bank of Slovenia); the main railway station in Ljubljana and many other buildings in Ljubljana.

In addition to the construction work of Tönnies, they also had important achievements in mechanical engineering. The machinery developed included that what was used in forestry industry; wood processing; pumps and turbines; belt presses and the instruments for measuring earthquakes.

== Sons ==
- Gustav Tönnies Jr. (September 3, 1851 – October 22, 1922) studied construction at the Danube. craft school, and in 1887 acquired the right to craft buildings. He worked as builder, stonecutter and carpenter in Trieste until 1900; In 1901 he received a concession for the same crafts in Ljubljana and compensate u. the Adolf brothers as the holder of the trade right for the building.
- Adolf Tönnies (September 21, 1855 – June 13, 1900) trained as a builder and worked for his father's building company. In 1883 he passed the technical exam in Trieste and obtained a concession for Trieste. He managed the Gustav Tönnies Company until his death.
- William Tönnies (April 24, 1857 – May 31, 1925) trained in mechanical engineering and had technical management of the iron foundry and machine shop.
- Emil Tönnies (September 7, 1863 – August 30, 1941) practiced as commercialist until 1914, managing his father's quarries in Aurisina and Monrupino. He continued the construction works, greatly expanding the family business. The iron foundry and machine shop were sold in 1919 by a new establishment.
- Rudolf Tönnies (April 20, 1869 – December 6, 1929 in Munich), studied construction and civil engineering and worked for the Croatian government in Zagreb, then as lead architect for the Government of Bosnia and Herzegovina in Sarajevo. In 1918 he returned to Ljubljana, obtained a trade concession (building master) and joined his brothers. In Ljubljana he built around 1923 the Credit Bank (today the seat of the National Bank) and at the same time the Ljubljana yard (headquarters of Railway Transport Company).

== See also ==
- Ferdinand Tönnies
- Rudolf Tönnies

== Bibliography ==
- Slovenski biografski leksikon 1925-1991.(2009). Elektronska izdaja. Ljubljana: SAZU
- Enciklopedija Slovenije; knjiga 13, Mladinska knjiga, Ljubljana, 1999
