= Ernst Lichtblau =

Austrian architect and designer

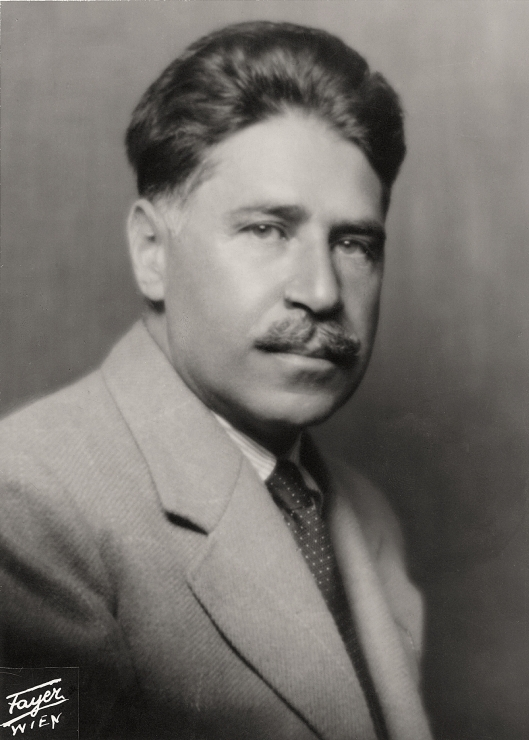
Ernst Lichtblau picture

Ernst Lichtblau (24 June 1883 in Vienna - 8 January 1963 in Vienna) was an Austrian architect and designer.

== Biography ==
Born in an assimilated Jewish family (the father was managing director of a factory for Meerschaum pipes), Lichtblau graduated in 1902 from the state school in the Schellinggasse in downtown Vienna, in which he later (1906–1914) would return as a teacher of furniture design. From 1902 to 1905 he studied at the Vienna Academy of Fine Arts in the master class of Otto Wagner.

=== Role in the development of the Bosnian style in architecture ===
Lichtblau in 1904 studied the ancient residential architecture throughout Bosnia and Herzegovina, seeking to create a modern style based on these indigenous forms. His work in Bosnia is one example of the Wagner School's contact with the architecture in Bosnia and Herzegovina.

His drawings were published in 1907 in the journal Der Architekt. They depict groups of old houses under the Jajce Fortress. He was impressed by the cascading and cubist forms of the roofs, the simple but powerful shapes of the houses, modeled by light and fine valers of scale black, white and brown. Thanks to the Art Nouveau interpretation of the contents, in them the old architecture of Bosnia manifested its hidden and subtle artistic values, reaching the level at which the points of contact with modern architecture showed themselves.

In another group of drawings, Lichtblau seeks to create houses or buildings for contemporary needs, contemporary forms and construction. Some drawings show an effort to create a typical house that would take the form of an old residential architecture, some again represent the example of a representative house - villas for Bosnia - of course again designed and designed according to the same principle.

The project for a house in Bosnia was created as early as 1904, so that date can be taken as the beginning of the development or search for a Bosnian style. Because in that Lichtblau project there are already significant components of the old Bosnian architecture - such as the elevated position of the house, the terraced access zone, the environment where the green is very significant is carefully cultivated, the house is enclosed by a high wall around a narrow courtyard. The house itself - the villa - shows that the architect respects the one-story elevation of the old houses; the house has latticework on the corner - with moldings - windows, a high pyramidal roof, white walls, size and proportion, elements and whole derived from old houses and built to new standards.

Lichtblau goes a step further. He designed a villa in Vienna in full Bosnian style, giving this architectural expression European and universal legitimacy.

Lichtbau designs the State Forest Directorate's project as a modern building with the characteristics of a centrally developed layout of a Bosnian apartment building.

=== Architect in Vienna ===
From 1910 to 1939 Lichtblau worked as a freelance architect in Vienna. From 1910 to 1920 he was also a freelancer of Wiener Werkstätte, later he was in a relationship with the Social Democrat-led community Rotes Wien, led a housing consultation, the consulting position for interior decoration (BEST), in the Karl-Marx-Hof and participated in communal housing. Lichtblau's most famous buildings include the so-called "chocolate house" in Vienna-Hietzing, a part of the Paul-Speiser-Hof and a double dwelling in the Vienna Werkbundsiedlung due to its façade design with dark brown majolica.

=== Exile in the USA ===
Lichtblau had to emigrate in 1939, he reached the United States from Britain and became a respected teacher at the Rhode Island School of Design.

=== Memory ===
In 1990, in Donaustadt (22nd district) in Vienna, the Lichtblaustraße was named after him, in Vienna Margareten (5th district) there is an Ernst-Lichtblau-Park.

== Main works ==
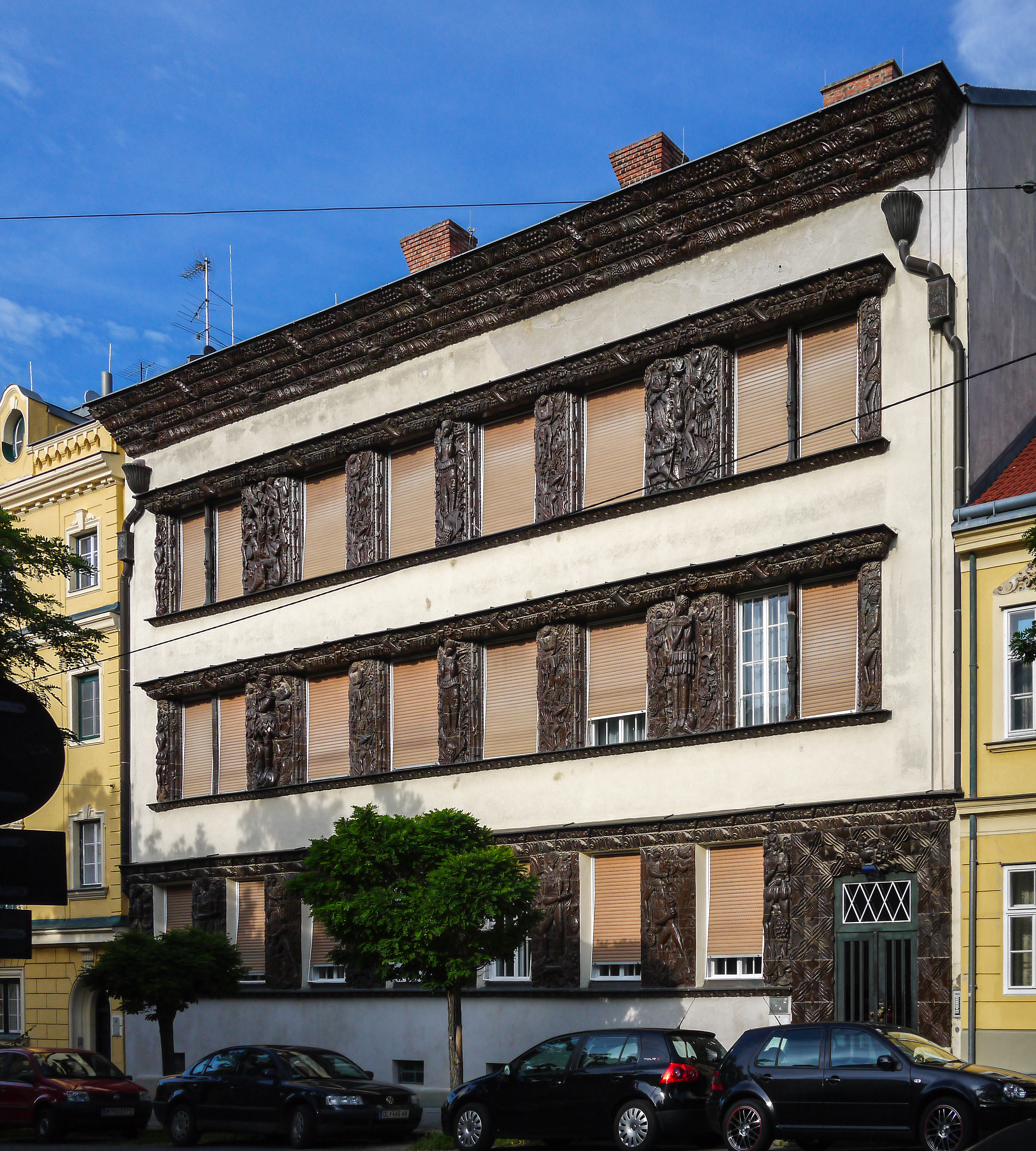
Schokoladenhaus, Wien 13, Wattmanngasse 29

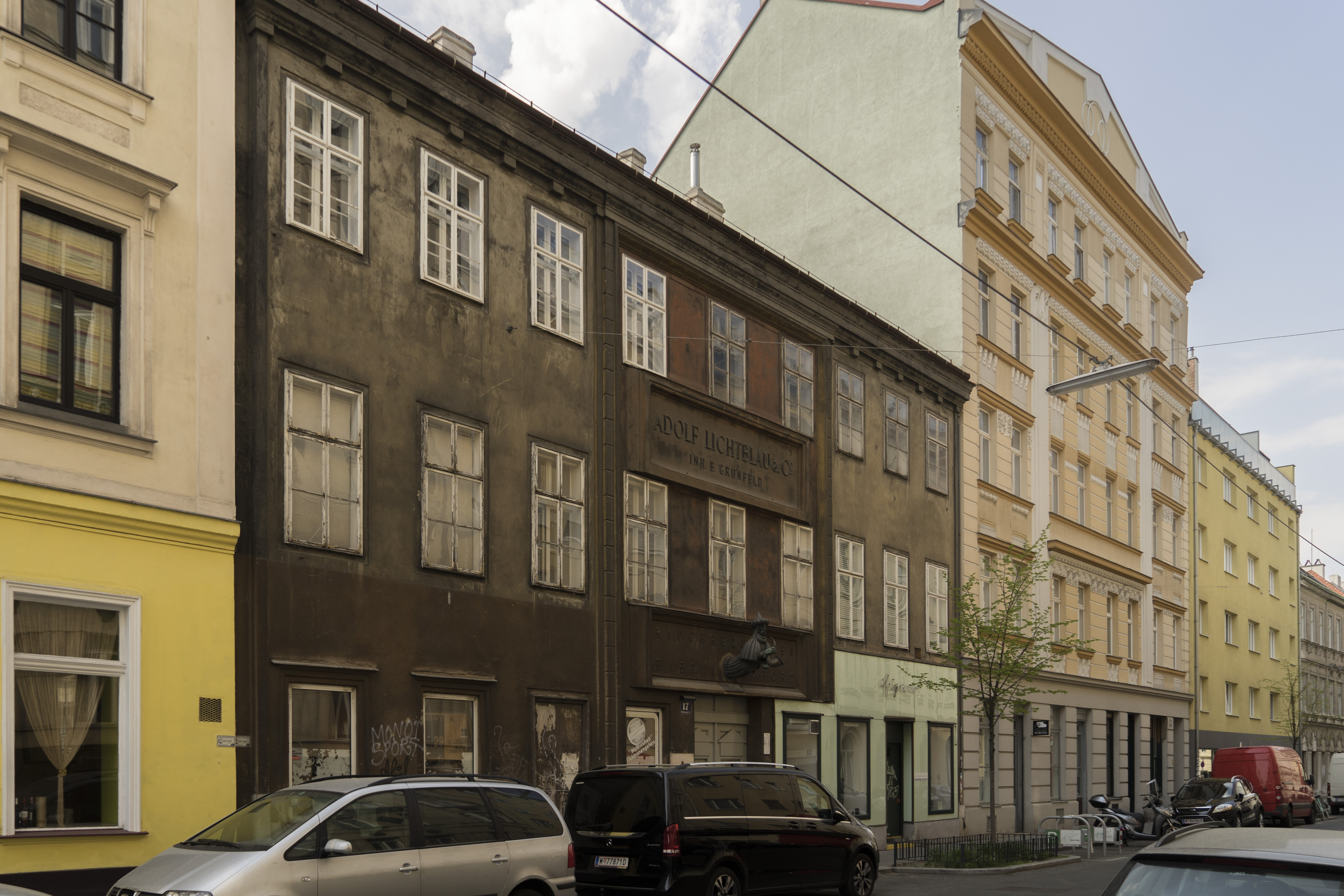
Umbau und Neufassadierung Wohn- und Geschäftshaus "Zum schwarzen Mohr" (Sitz der Firma Adolf Lichtblau Raucherrequisiten), Wien 7, Hermanngasse 17

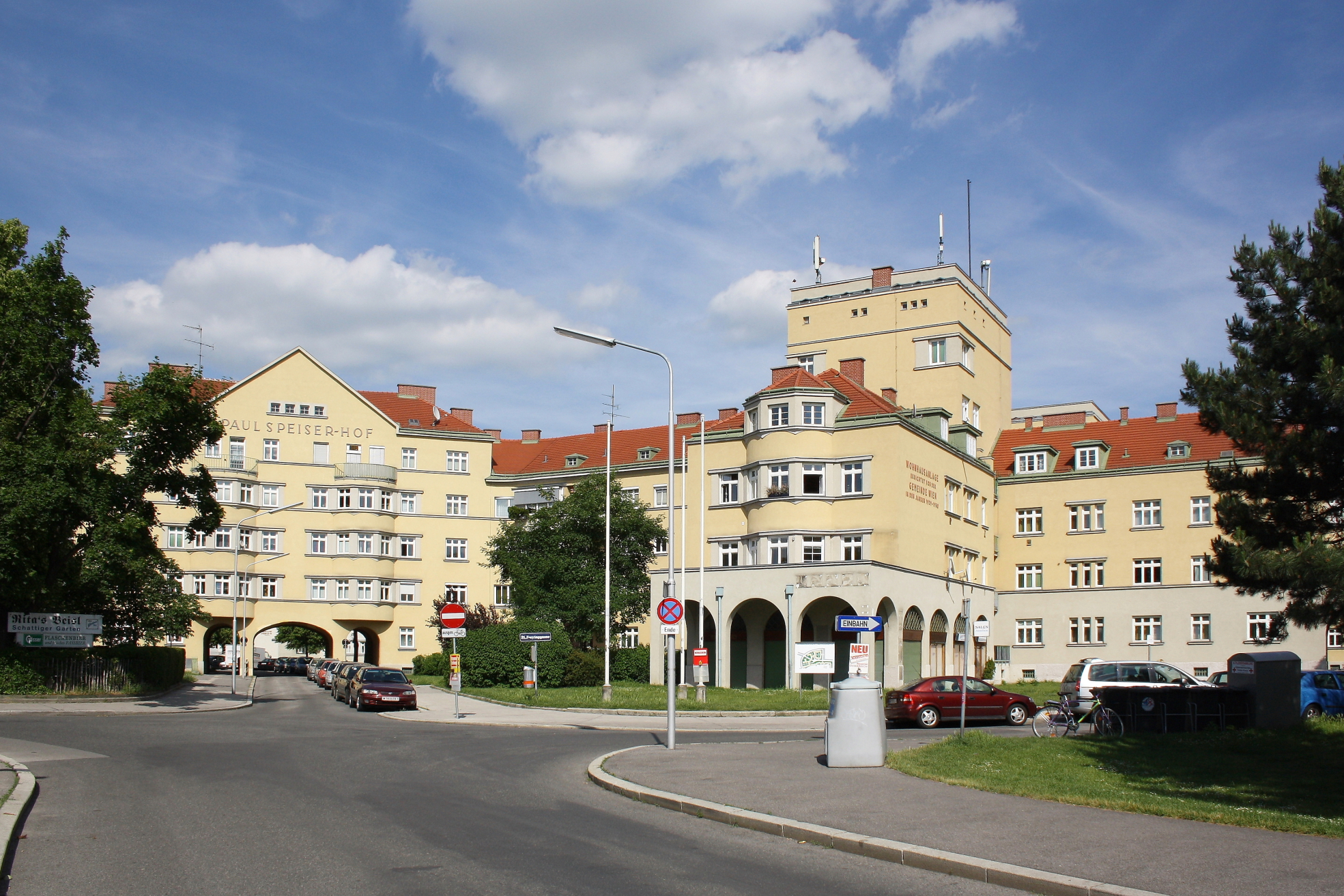
Paul-Speiser-Hof (Bauteil II), Wien 21, Franklinstraße 20

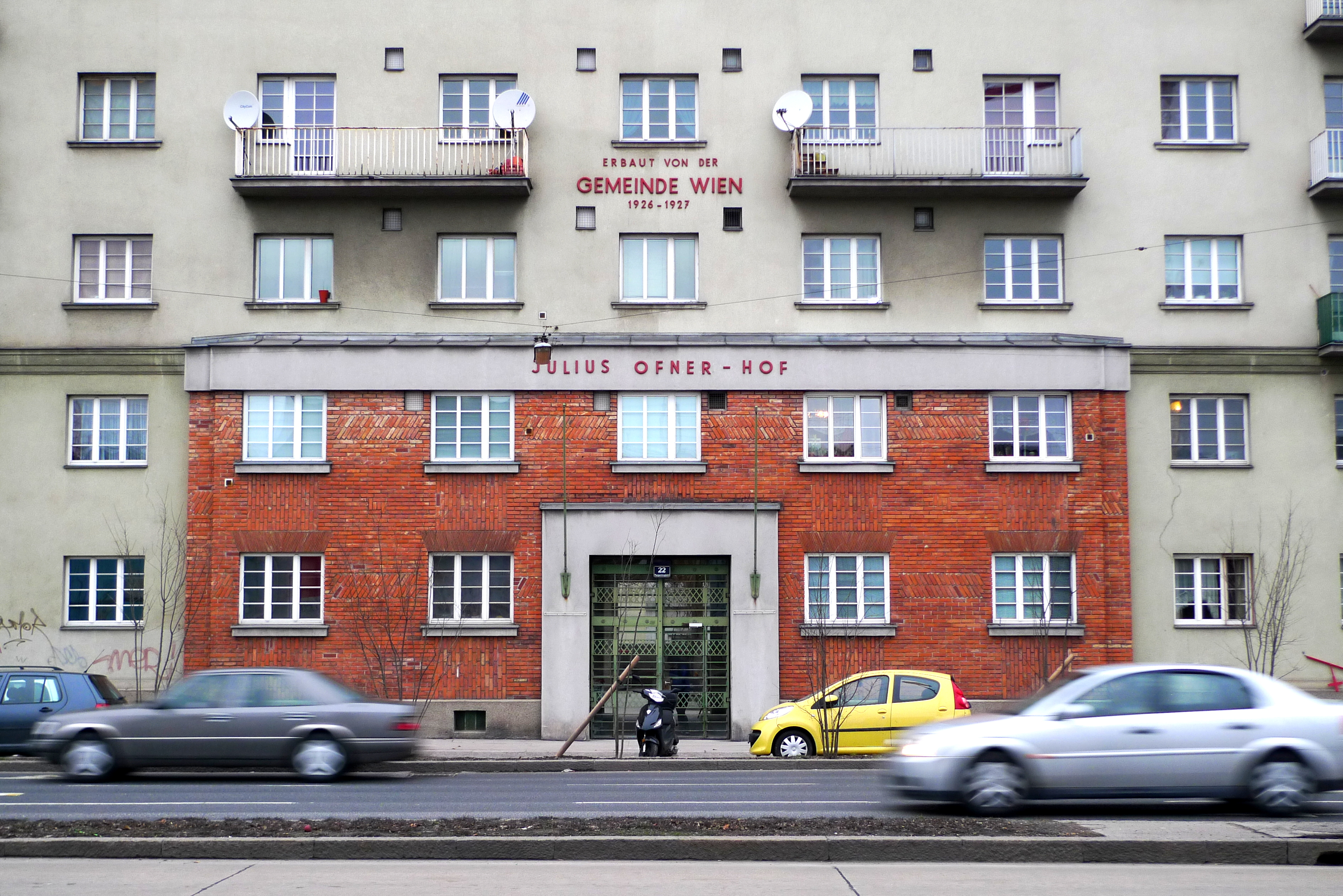
Julius-Ofner-Hof, Wien 5, Margaretengürtel 22

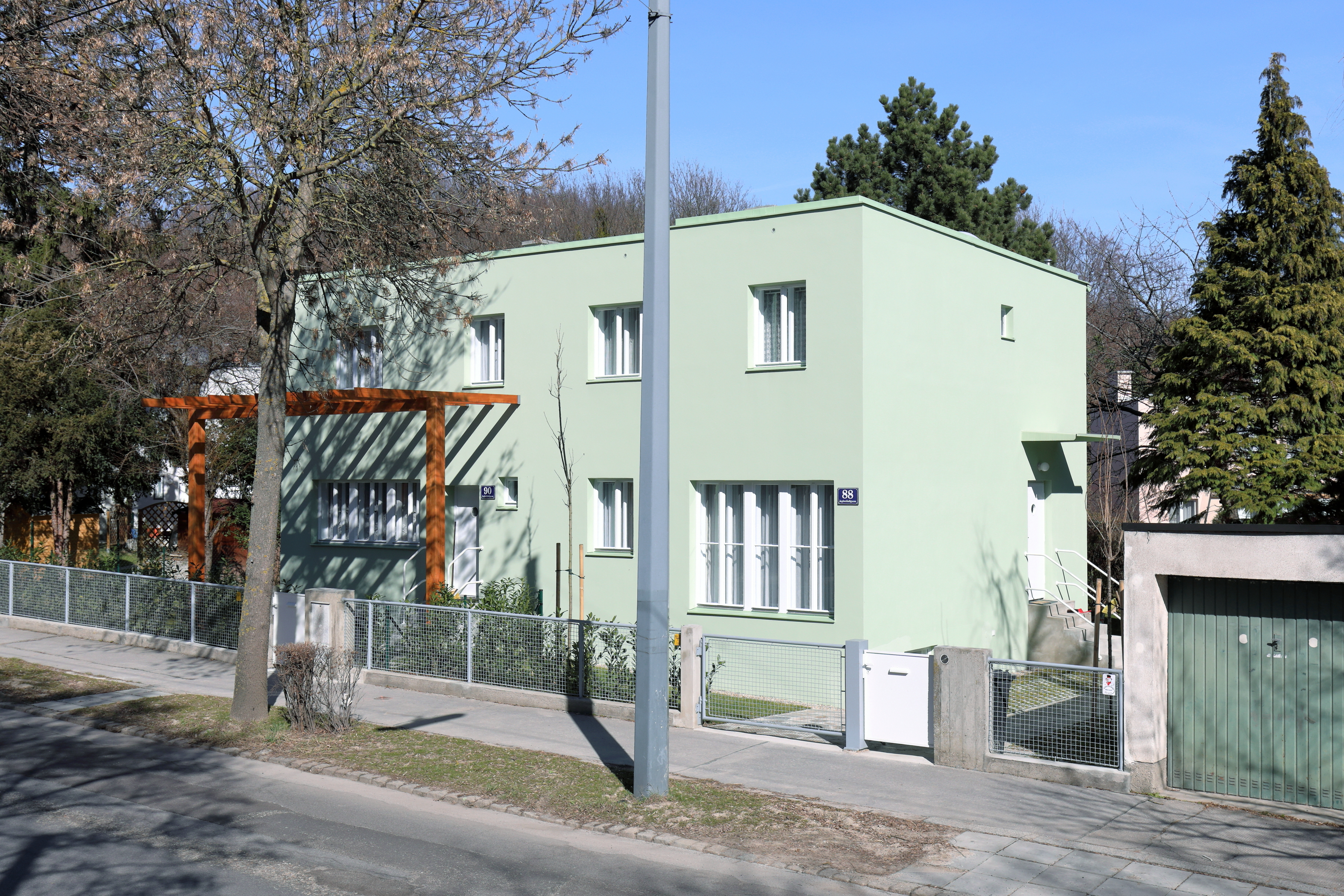
Doppelwohnhaus Werkbundsiedlung, Wien 13, Jagdschlossgasse 88–90

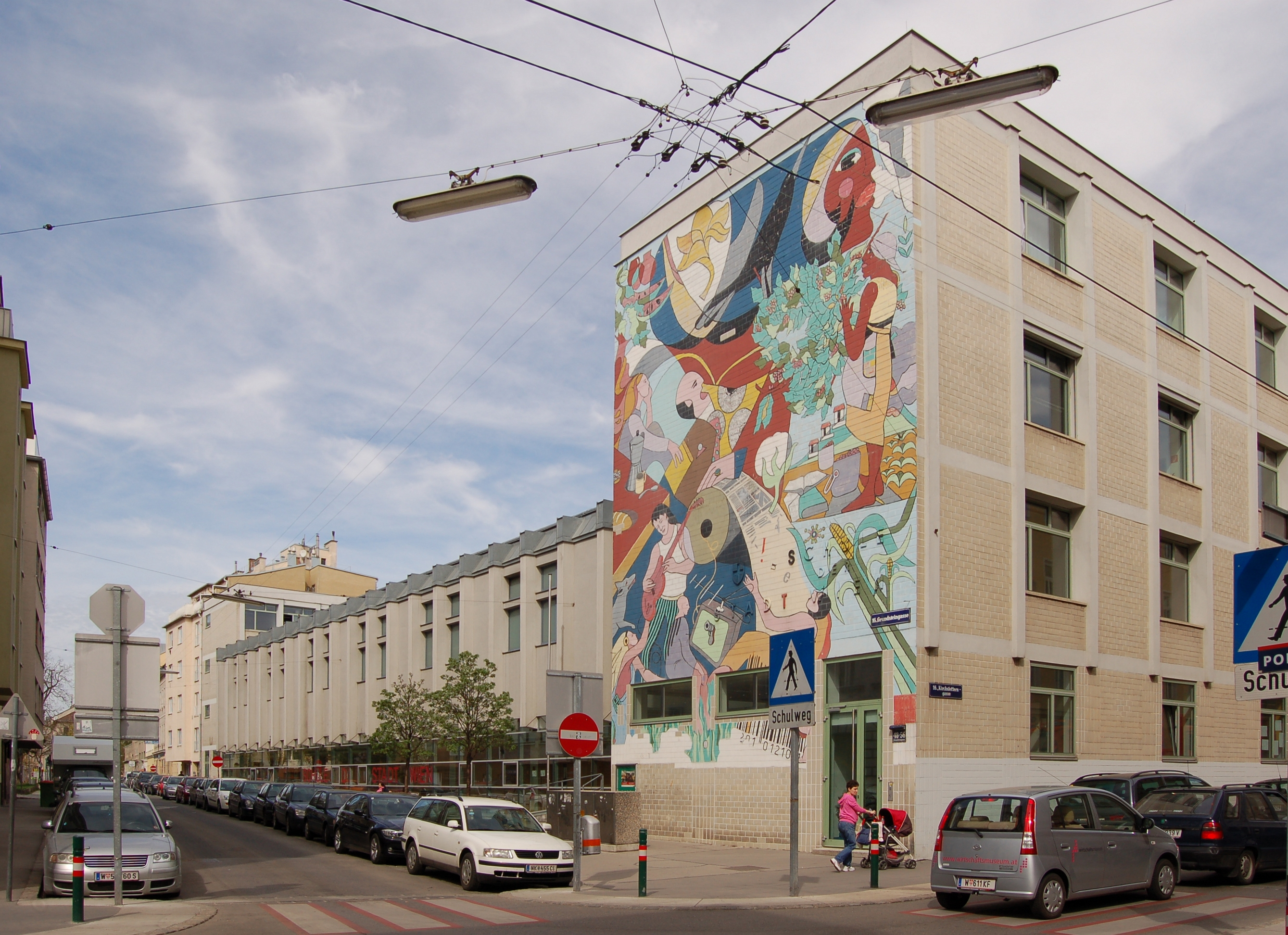
Schule Wien 16, Grundsteingasse 48

== Bibliography ==
- Max Eisler: "Jungwiener Baukunst Ernst Lichtblau und Walter Sobotka." In: Moderne Bauformen, Jg. 25, 1926, pp. 73–112.
- Sarnitz, August (1994). Ernst Lichtblau : Architekt (1883-1963) : Gestell und Gestalt im Raum Reflexionen über ein Paradigma der modernen Architektur. Ernst Lichtblau. Wien: Böhlau. ISBN 3-205-05513-6. OCLC 31691684.
- Handbuch österreichischer Autorinnen und Autoren jüdischer Herkunft 18. bis 20. Jahrhundert. Susanne Blumesberger, Michael Doppelhofer, Gabriele Mauthe, Österreichische Nationalbibliothek. München: Saur. 2002. p. 826. ISBN 3-598-11545-8. OCLC 49635343.
