= Močioci =

Močioci may refer to:

- Močioci, Serbia, a village near Ivanjica
- Močioci, Stari Grad, a village near Sarajevo, Bosnia and Herzegovina
- Močioci, Šipovo, a village near Šipovo, Bosnia and Herzegovina
