= Church of Saints Cyril and Methodius, Sarajevo =

Church of Saints Cyril and Methodius
- Crkva svetih Ćirila i Metoda
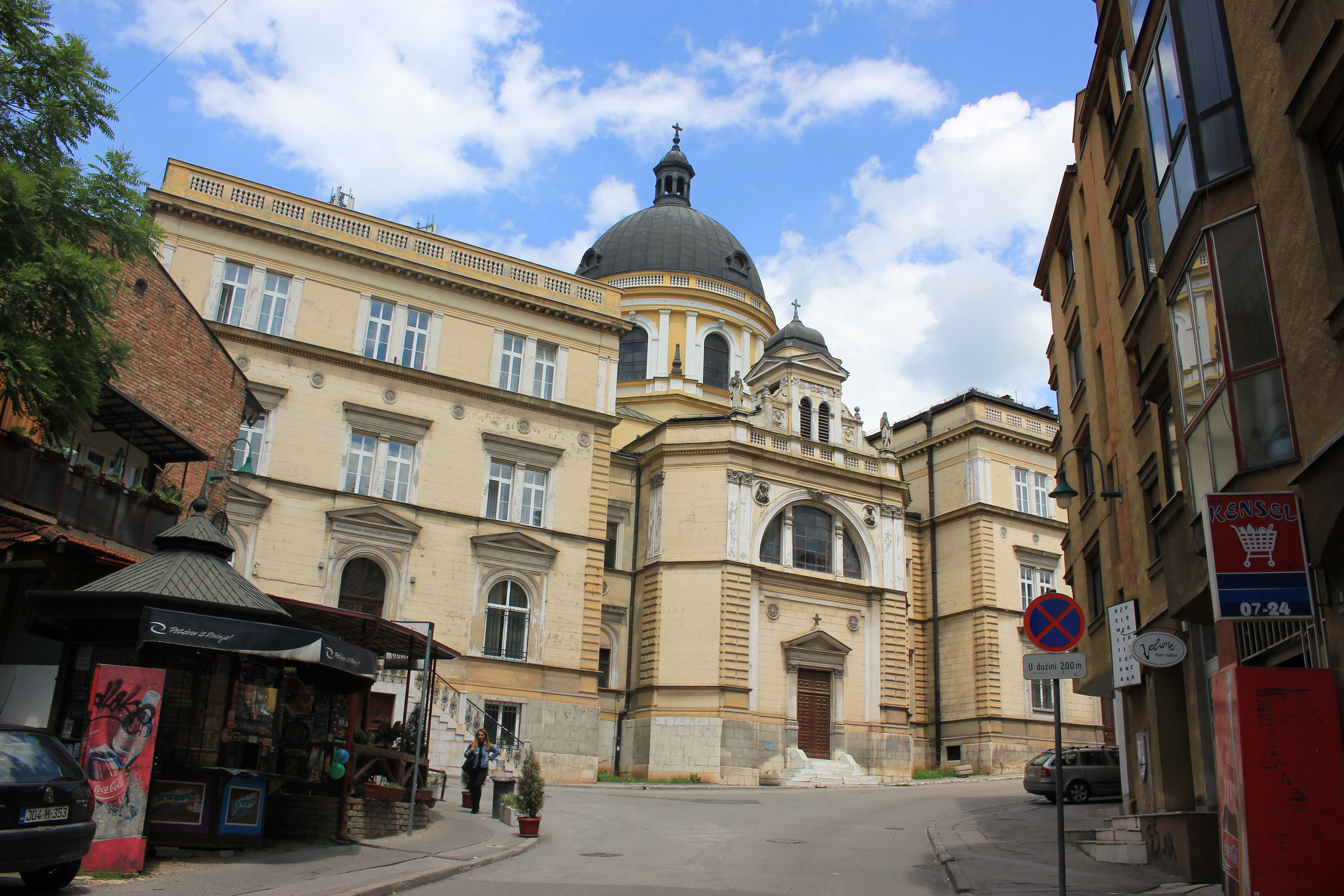
- Church of Saints Cyril and Methodius in Sarajevo
- Church of Saints Cyril and Methodius
- 43.8605°N 18.4291°E
- Location: Sarajevo, Bosnia and Herzegovina
- Denomination: Roman Catholic

History
- Status: Church
- Founded: 1892
- Dedication: Cyril and Methodius

Architecture
- Functional status: Active
- Architect: Josip Vancaš
- Architectural type: Church
- Style: Neo-Renaissance
- Completed: 1896

Administration
- Archdiocese: Vrhbosna

The Church of Saints Cyril and Methodius is a neo-Renaissance Catholic place of worship within the Higher Theological School of the Archdiocese of Vrhbosna. It is located in the Sarajevo municipality of Stari Grad. The school began operating in 1890. Construction of this sacral, partly educational, building began in 1892 after the acceptance of Josip Vancaš's blueprints, presented in 1892 and finalized in 1895. The project was completed in 1896, when the church was blessed.

In line with his previous architectural designs, Vancaš, who is largely responsible for the current appearance of Sarajevo, introduced some Baroque elements into the neo-Renaissance structure, noticeable on the facade, bell tower and sculptures. The overall impression is strongly reminiscent of St. Peter's Basilica, which likely served as a model for him.

The artwork in the interior was done by various artists, including Austrian painter Josip Krikler, the Croatian painter Oton Iveković, and the Austrian painter Franz Schmidt.

On March 11, 2011, the Commission for the Preservation of National Monuments (Zeynep Ahunbay, Martin Cherry, Amra Hadžimuhamedović, Dubravko Lovrenović and Ljiljana Ševo) adopted a decision declaring the Church of Saints Cyril and Methodius with the Seminary in Sarajevo a national monument of Bosnia and Herzegovina.
