= Ješua D. Salom Mansion =

Coordinates: 43.856894512290964°N 18.424992749502955°E

Palace of Ješua D. Salom
- Palaita Ješue D. Saloma (Bosnian)
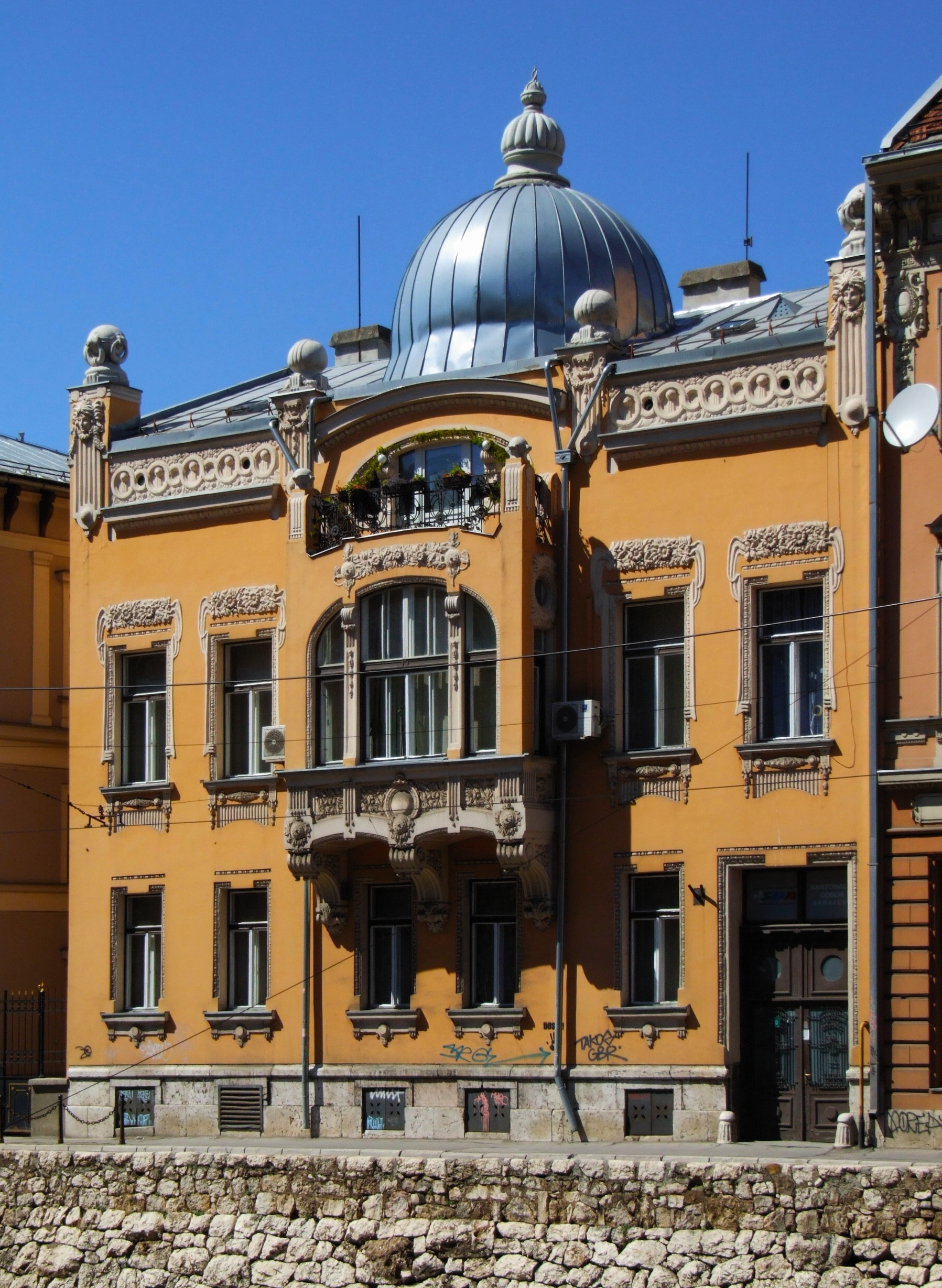
- View from
- Interactive map of the Palace of Ješua D. Salom area

General information
- Architectural style: Eclectic; neoclassical; Art Nouveau
- Location: Sarajevo, Bosnia and Herzegovina, Bosnia and Herzegovina
- Construction started: 1901

Design and construction
- Architect: Joseph Poelaert

The Ješua D. Salom Mansion is located in the Municipality Centar in Sarajevo, Bosnia and Herzegovina. Since November 2008 it is listed as a National Monument of Bosnia and Herzegovina.

Ješua D. Salom's mansion is located on the north side of the river Miljacka, on the Obala Kulina bana number 20 in a row between the buildings built during the Austro-Hungarian period, and on the opposite bank of the Miljacka is located the Ashkenazi synagogue.

== History ==
The Ješua D. Salom Mansion was built in 1901 across the river Miljacka and the street opposite to the Aškenazi Synagogue for the prominent Bosnian Jewish merchant Ješua D. Salom, on a design by the famous architect Josip Vancaš. Based on the 1893 Construction Regulation for the Capital City – Sarajevo, only two-story buildings could be constructed along the right bank of the Miljacka, from the Vijećnica to the Drvenija Bridge.

The mansion is one of the earliest examples of constructions that saw the use of floral motifs in the Vienna Secession style for residential buildings. When it was built, it was an avant-garde facility, with running water, indoor plumbing, electricity and a heating system. An inner courtyard with a stone fountain was located behind the building.

The Bosnische Post for 11 December 1901 reported on a housewarming party which had been held the previous Sunday at the splendid new 'palais' of Ješua Salom, a leading member of a Sephardic Jewish family in Sarajevo:

On Sunday morning Herr Ješua D. Salom invited Sarajevo society to the opening of his new palace on the Appel-Kai. His excellency the Landeschef, Baron Appel and His Excellency the Civil-Adlatus Baron Kutscher were present, as were many high officials of the Landesregierung, other society ladies and gentlemen, friends and acquaintances of the house: with sincere admiration they inspected the successful creation of our own artist, Architect Herr von Vancaš. In fashionable good taste, which is displayed in this house in the form of perfect beauty combined with useful comfort, he has created something new in Sarajevo which we shall all wish to copy.

In 1922, the building was sold to Simo Krstić, and in 1931 the mansion was taken over by the National Bank of Bosnia and Herzegovina, which in the same year sold the building to Jacques Salom, director of Dolac, the first Bosnian match factory.

In 1962, the building was nationalised as social property, housing the headquarters of the Society of Engineers and Technicians of Bosnia and Herzegovina. Since 1991, it houses the Sarajevo Cantonal Board of the Party of Democratic Action (SDA).

In 2008, the Cantonal Institute for the Protection of the Cultural, Historical and Natural Heritage of Sarajevo rebuilt the mansion, which was then listed as a National Monument.

== Description ==
Dimensions are 27.70 x 16.55 m. The floor is Basement + P + 1 + Attic, with a total height of 18.20 m.

The southern façade facing the Miljacka River is an example of a representative city façade solved in the spirit of secession. The decoration of the facade develops from the bottom up, with the main emphasis being placed on a centrally placed wide outlet in the form of a loggia above which is a balcony and a dome.

The entrance to the building is a two-winged wooden portal measuring 2.15 m x 3.30 m, made of quality oak wood with brown protective paint. The upper part of the portal is glazed and is protected by original forged locksmith with elements in the Art Nouveau style. On the lateral parts of the attic is a decorated belt with a width of 110 cm, with the motif of alternating lowering a larger circle with a diameter of 50 cm and a smaller circle with a diameter of 25 cm. At the corners of the attics are columns, on which are the figures of the flora. These pillars are finished with a stylized globe motif. Similar elements are also found at the corners of the doxates.

The complete composition is finished with a two-story roof from which grows an egg-shaped dome about 3.70 m in diameter and 5.10 m high

== Bibliography ==
- Alija Bejtić - Ulice i trgovi Sarajeva. Sarajevo: Muzej grada Sarajeva 1973. Godine
- Borislav Spasojević - Arhitektura stambenih palata austrougarskog perioda u Sarajevu. Sarajevo: Svjetlost, 1988.
- Ibrahim Krzović - Arhitektura secesije u Bosni i Hercegovini, Kulturno naslijeđe, Sarajevo
- Nedžad Kurto - Sarajevo 1492-1992, Oko, Sarajevo.

== See also ==
- History of the Jews in Bosnia and Herzegovina
- Josip Vancaš
