= Normann Palace =

Government building in Osijek, Croatia

- Palača Normann
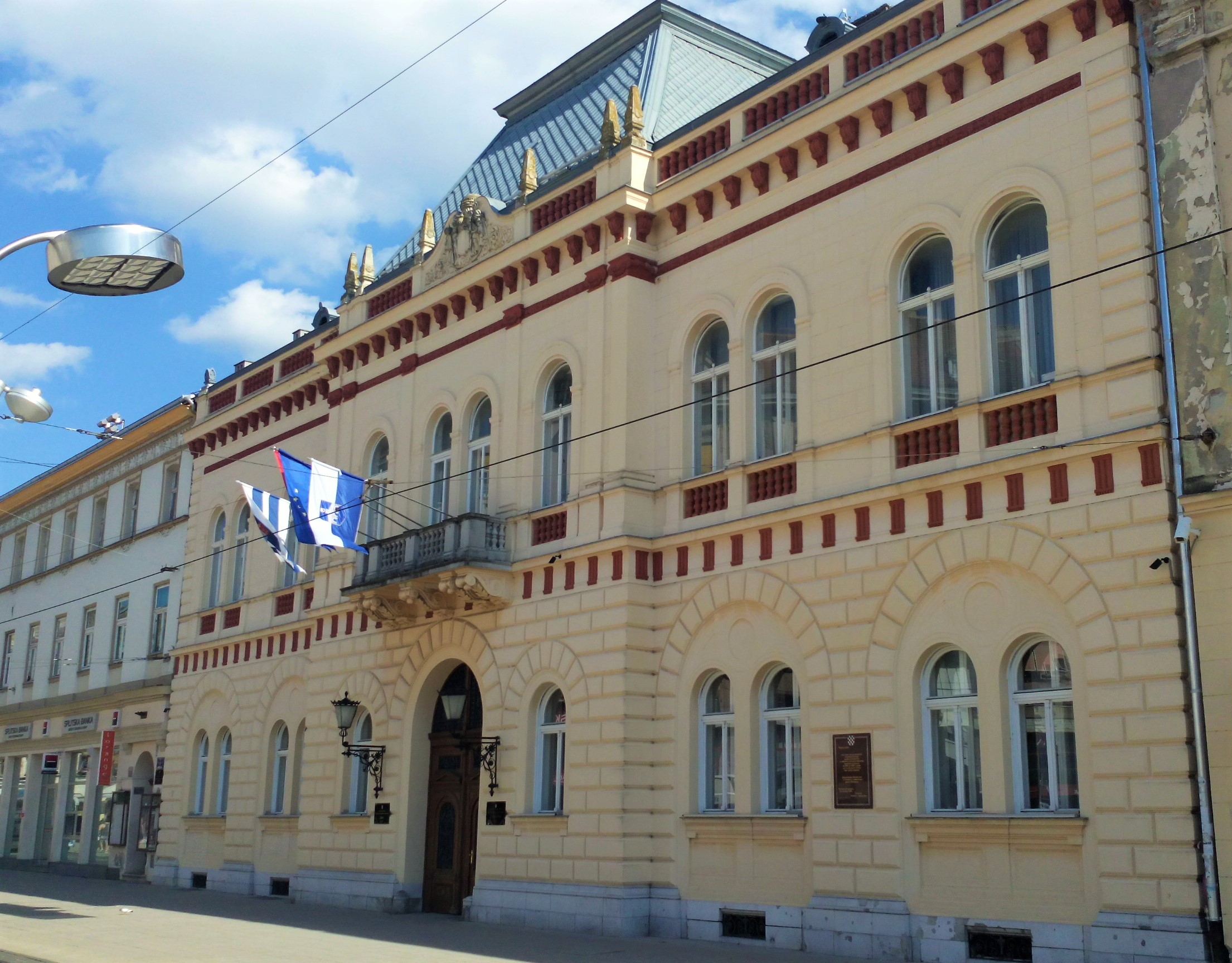
- Interactive map of the Normann Palace area

General information
- Architectural style: Neo-Renaissance
- Location: Osijek, Croatia
- Current tenants: County Government of Osijek-Baranja County
- Construction started: 1891
- Completed: 1894
- Opened: 1894; 132 years ago

Design and construction
- Architect: Josip Vancaš

Normann Palace (Croatian: Palača Normann) is a government building of Osijek-Baranja County in Osijek, Croatia. It was designed by Josip Vancaš and built from 1891 to 1894.
