= Josip Vancaš =

Austro-Hungarian and Yugoslav architect

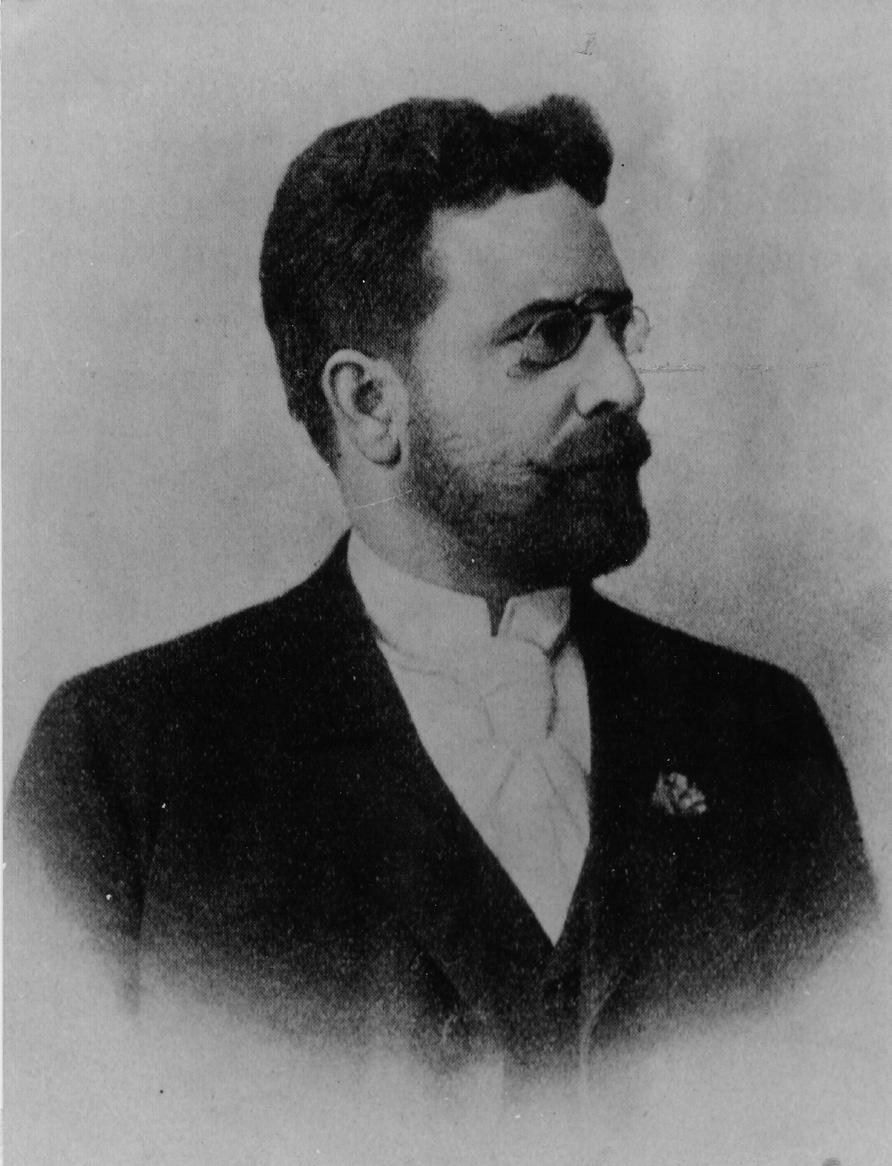
- Josip Vancaš, 1900.
- Born: 22 March 1859; Sopron, Kingdom of Hungary, Austrian Empire
- Died: 15 December 1932 (aged 73); Zagreb, Kingdom of Yugoslavia
- Occupation: Architect
- Buildings: Sarajevo Cathedral; Presidency Building

Josip Vancaš (22 March 1859 – 15 December 1932) was an Austro-Hungarian and Yugoslav architect who spent most of his career in the Bosnian city of Sarajevo, where he designed over two hundred buildings. He also designed important buildings in present-day Croatia and Slovenia. He was also the first conductor of the Männer-gesang-verein in Sarajevo, at its founding in 1887.

== Life ==
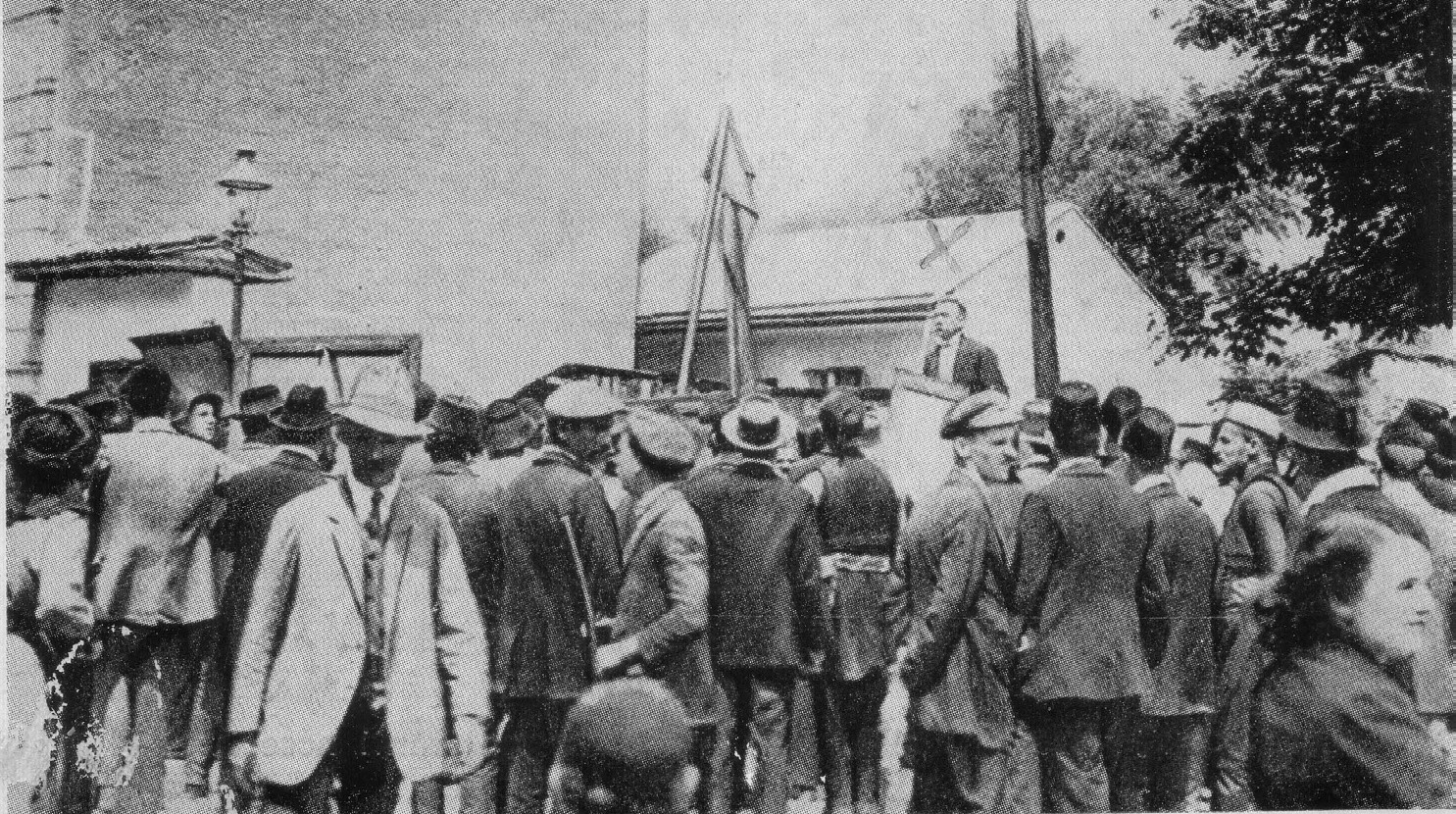
Josip Vancaš addressing a crowd in Sarajevo, 29 June 1914.

Born into a Croat family in Sopron, Hungary, where his father worked as a postal clerk, Vancaš attended the High Technical School in Zagreb, where his father had been appointed postmaster. He then moved to Vienna to study architecture at the Technical University from 1876 to 1881. For one year Vancaš worked in the offices of Ferdinand Fellner and Hermann Helmer, then graduated in 1883 at the Art Academy in Vienna under the supervision of Friedrich von Schmidt, expert in medieval architecture, from whom he adopted an eclectic historical style.

Schmidt recommended Vancaš to Benjamin Kállay to design the Sarajevo Cathedral, and Vancaš came to Sarajevo in 1884, working for the government until 1890 and then running his own office till 1921. He would remain there for thirty-seven years, becoming a leading architectural authority, a member of the first Bosnian Parliament (1910), and the deputy mayor of Sarajevo.

During his long career Vancaš remained devote admirer of Viennese architectural trends and often included them in his Bosnia and Herzegovina projects. However he did not limit himself to merely imitating role-models and tried to adapt Viennese models to Bosnian conditions. Historicism and eclecticism dominate in his works but the elements of Vienna Secession occur later as well. In his projects he goes from pseudo-romantic to pseudo-oriental influences. He studied the Bosnian local architecture and attempted by applying its characteristic elements to create a truly Bosnian style.

Vancaš also recognised a Bosnian style which can be compared with Scandinavian National Romanticism. The Bosnian Style was championed by a younger generation of architects, like Czech architect Josip Pospošil, Slovene architect Rudolf Tönnies, and Austrian architect Ernst Lichtblau, who all studied at the Art Academy in Vienna with Karl von Hasenauer and Otto Wagner. The style was, however, named by Vancaš, who was now Sarajevo's senior architect for whom many of these younger architects worked.

During his long time in Bosnia (1883–1921) Vancaš constructed 102 houses, 70 churches, 12 schools, 10 palaces, 10 banks, 10 government municipal buildings, 6 hotels and taverns, and remodeled a series of buildings. Vancaš also produced drafts for church altars as well as drawings for the residential and ecclesiastical interiors. He exhibited his work at world exhibitions in Budapest (1896), Vienna (1898) and Paris (1900). In 1911, as a representative in Bosnia-Herzegovina Parliament, he submitted a resolution on the protection of cultural monuments in Bosnia & Herzegovina.

On 29 June 1914, Vancaš was one of the speakers addressing the crowd that later vandalized and looted Serb-owned property in Sarajevo during the unrest after Gavrilo Princip's assassination of Archduke Franz Ferdinand of Austria.

Vancaš also wrote several studies on Bosnian folk and urban architecture. From 1921 onwards he lived in Zagreb, where he died in Zagreb on 15 December 1932 at the age of 73.

== Works ==
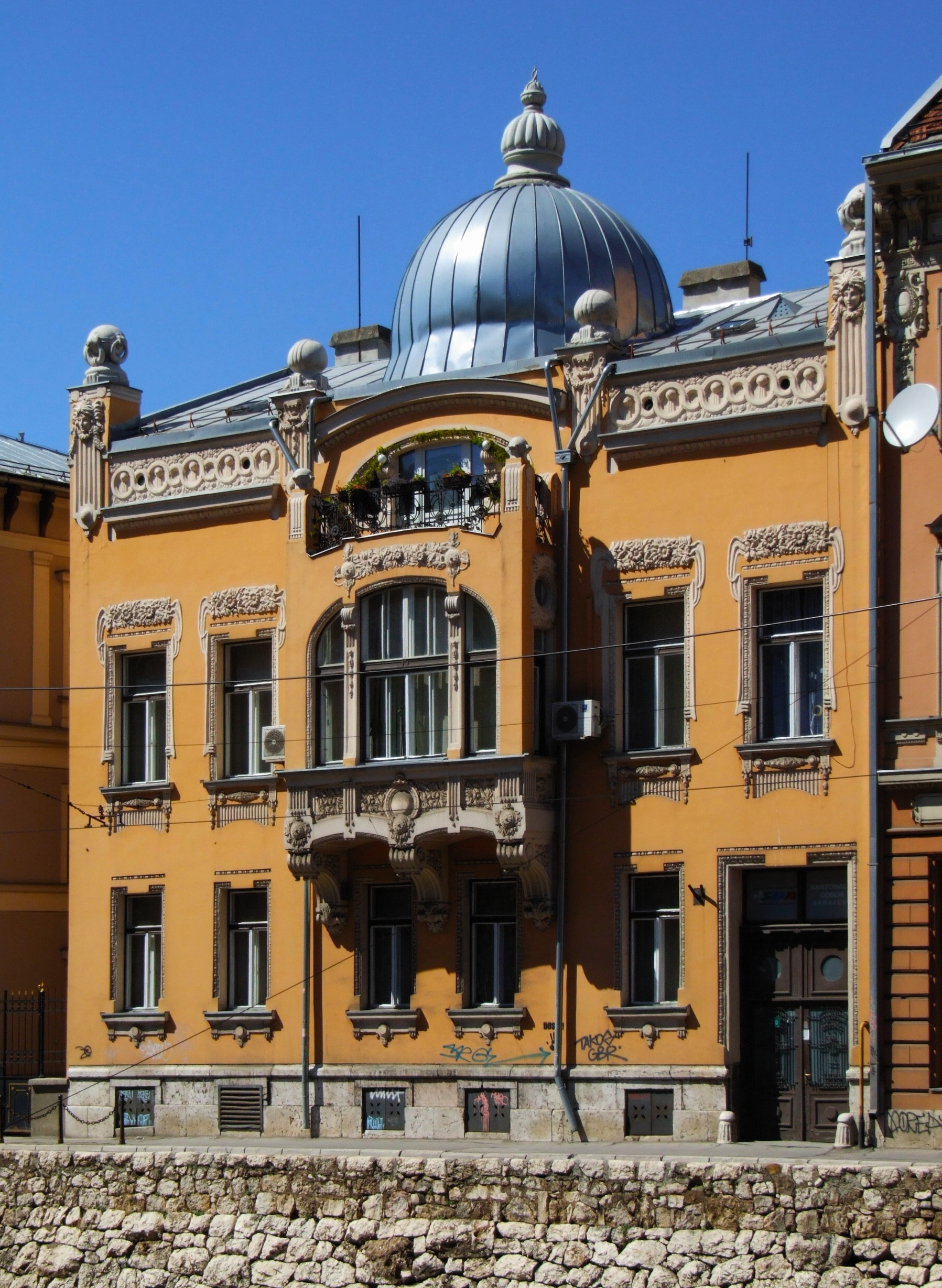
Ješua D. Salom Mansion in Sarajevo (1901)

His most significant works include:

- the neo-Gothic Sacred Heart Cathedral, Sarajevo (1884–89)
- the neo-Renaissance palace of government, today the Presidency Building (1884-1886)
- the Parish Church of the Purified Heart of Mary in Bijeljina (1885)
- the Normann Palace in Osijek (1891-1894)
- the pseudo-folklore pavilion of Bosnia and Herzegovina during the Millennial Exhibition in Budapest (1896)
- the Seminary of St. Cyril and Methodius in Sarajevo (1892-1896)
- the First Croatian Savings Bank in Zagreb (1898–1900)
- the People's Loan Bank in Ljubljana (1900-1907)
- the Ješua D. Salom Mansion in Sarajevo (1901)
- the Mathilde Villa in Sarajevo (1902-1903),
- the parish church of St. George in Desinic (1901-1902)
- the parish church of St. Nicholas in Krapina (1901-1903)
- St. Stanislaus Institute - school in Ljubljana (1901-1905)
- the Hotel Union in Ljubljana (1902-1903)
- the City Savings Bank in Ljubljana (1902-1903)
- the parish church of St. Michael in Vareš (1905-1906)
- the Central Post Office and Telegraph Palace in Sarajevo (1907-1913)
- St. Peter's Parish Church, Radeče (1911)
- the Queen of the Holy Rosary Church in Sarajevo
- the parish church of St. John the Baptist in Konjic (1894 - 1918)

Although he worked mostly in the territory of Bosnia and Herzegovina, as shown by the list of his works, he realized part of his work in Croatia. Working on various projects financed mostly by the Croatian Government, Vancaš became known alongside Herman Bollé as the most important designer of sacred buildings in Croatia in the last decades of the 19th and early 20th centuries. He designed equally in the Neo-Gothic, Neo-Romanesque, Neo-Renaissance, rarely in the Neo-Byzantine and Neo-Baroque style, and since the end of the 19th century he turned to the secessionist style.

He also achieved great work in the area of the then Carniola province (central part of present-day Slovenia), where he built churches in Bled, Prečna and Mirna Peč, and a number of buildings in Ljubljana.

== Buildings ==
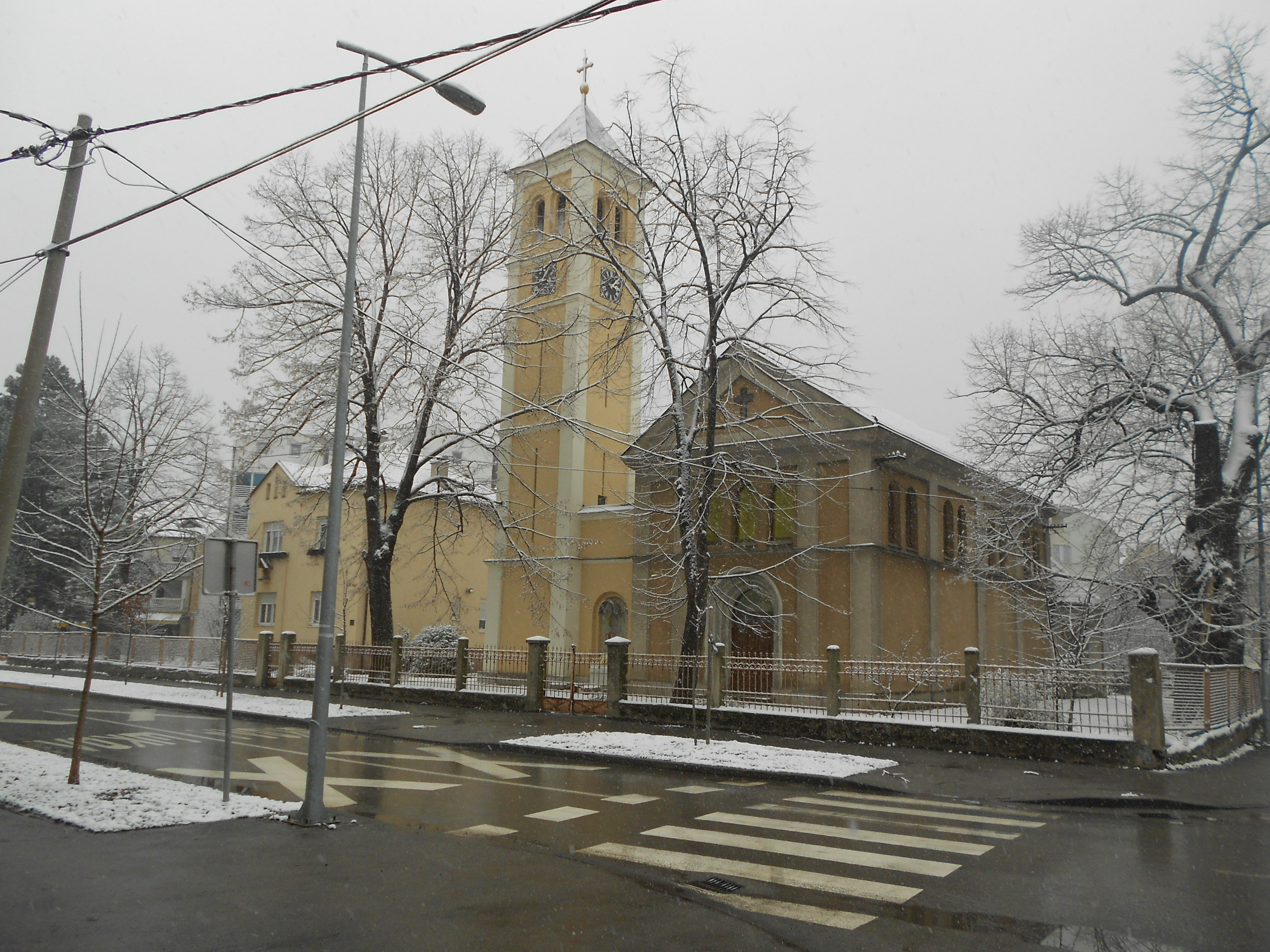
Parish Church of the Purified Heart of Mary in Bijeljina (1885)

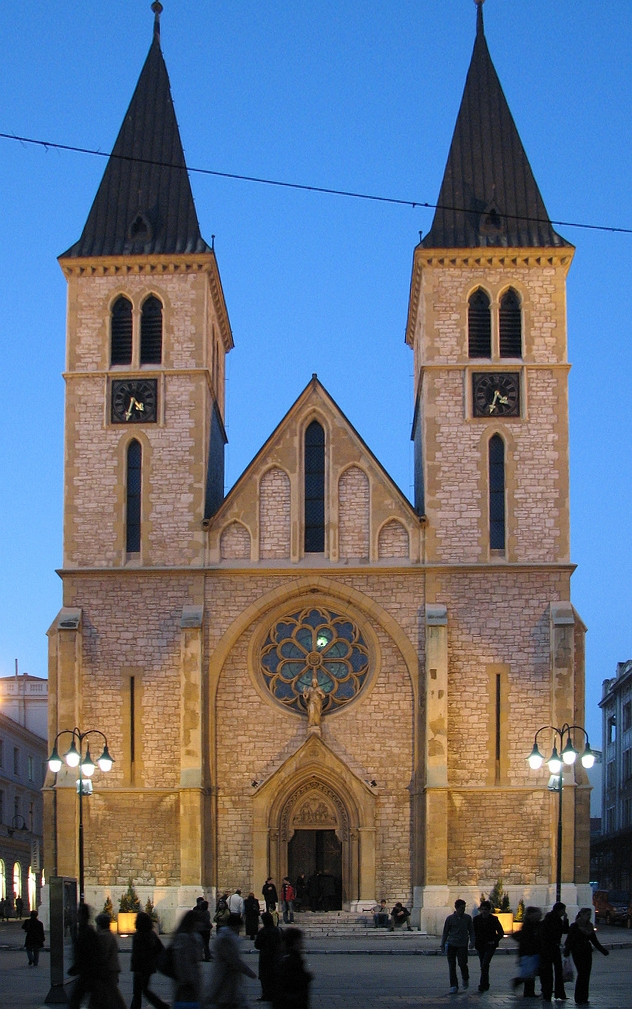
Sacred Heart Cathedral in Sarajevo (1884–1889)

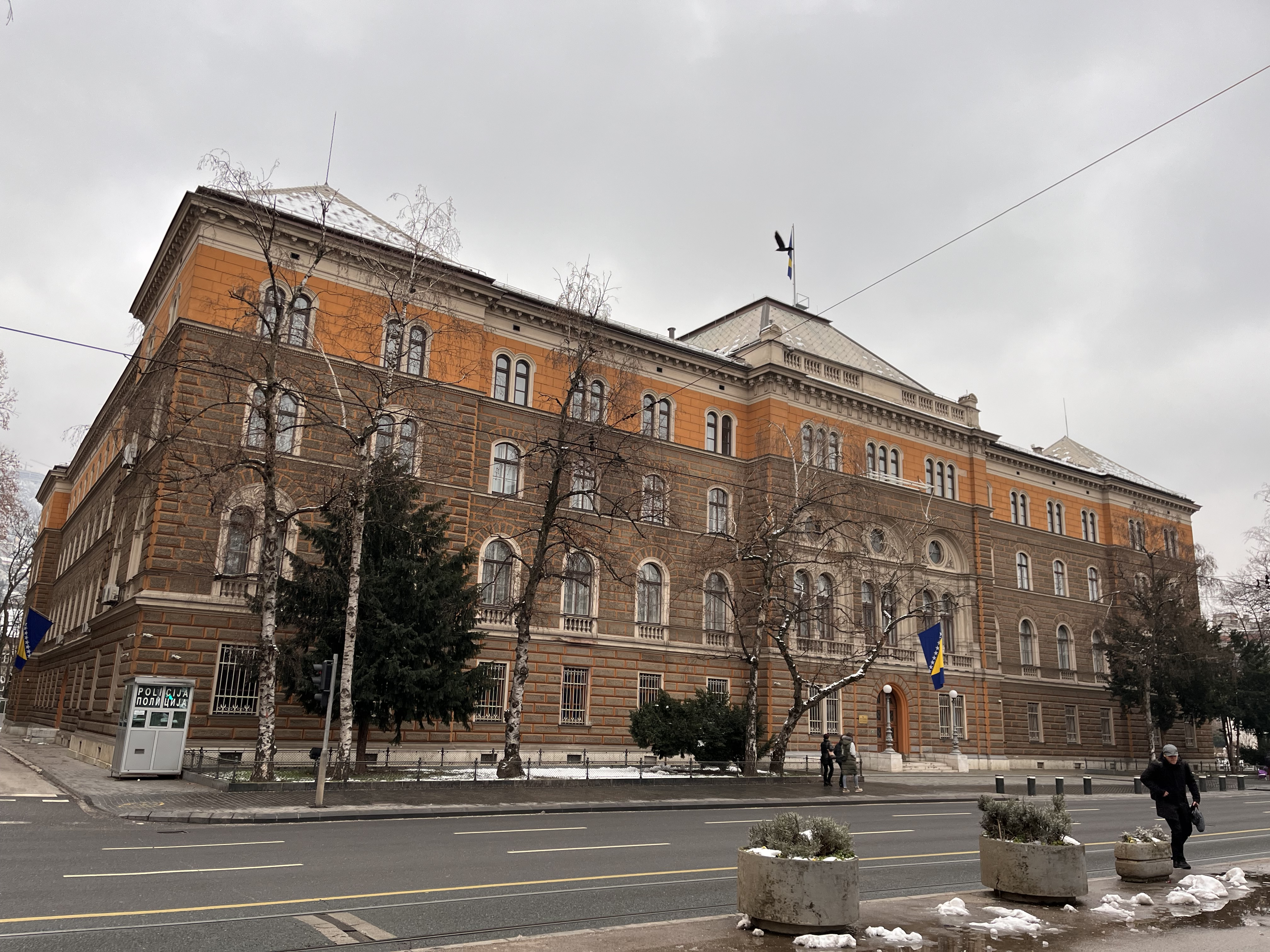
Presidency Building, Sarajevo (1884–1886)

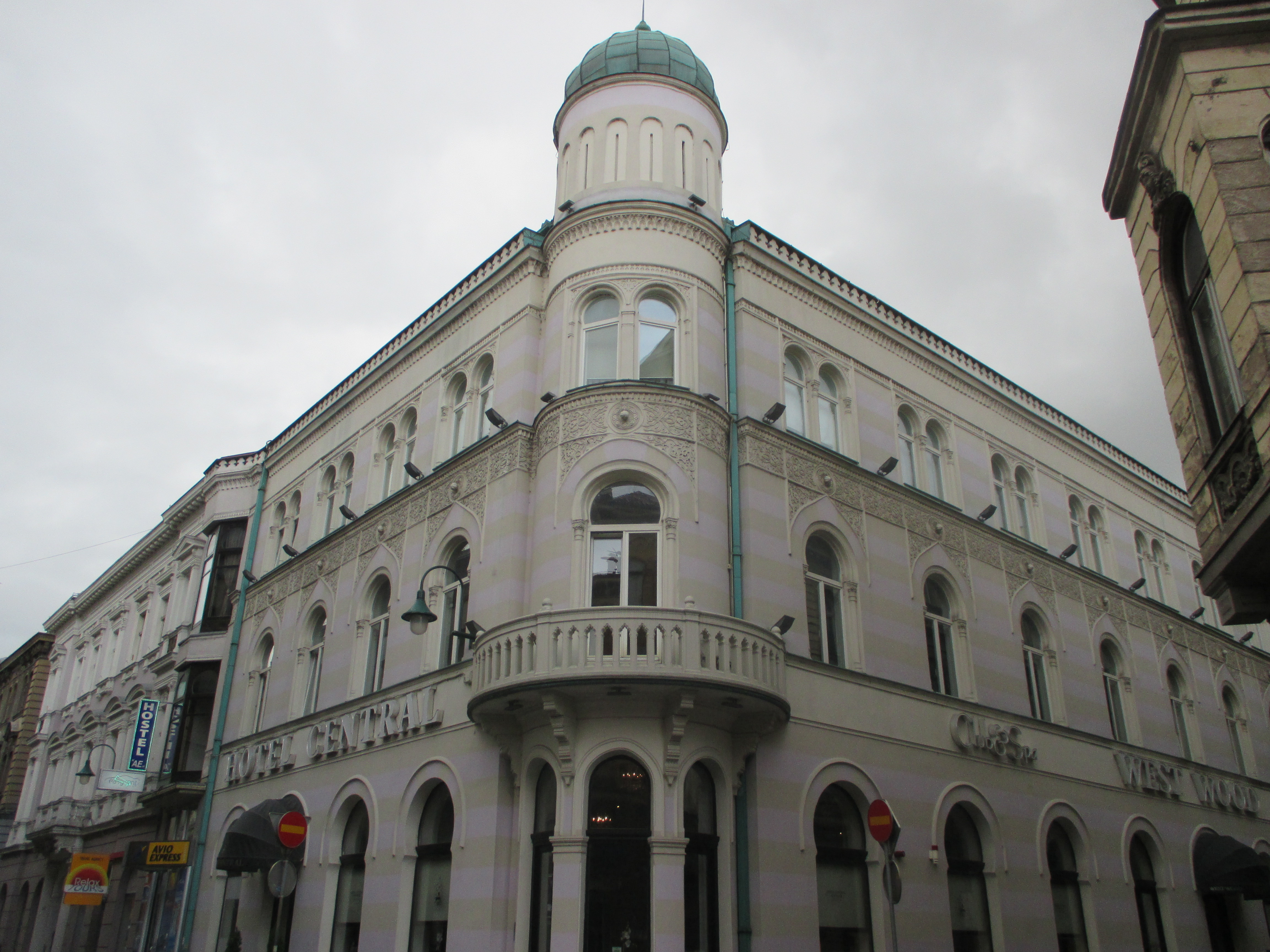
Hotel Central, Sarajevo (1889)

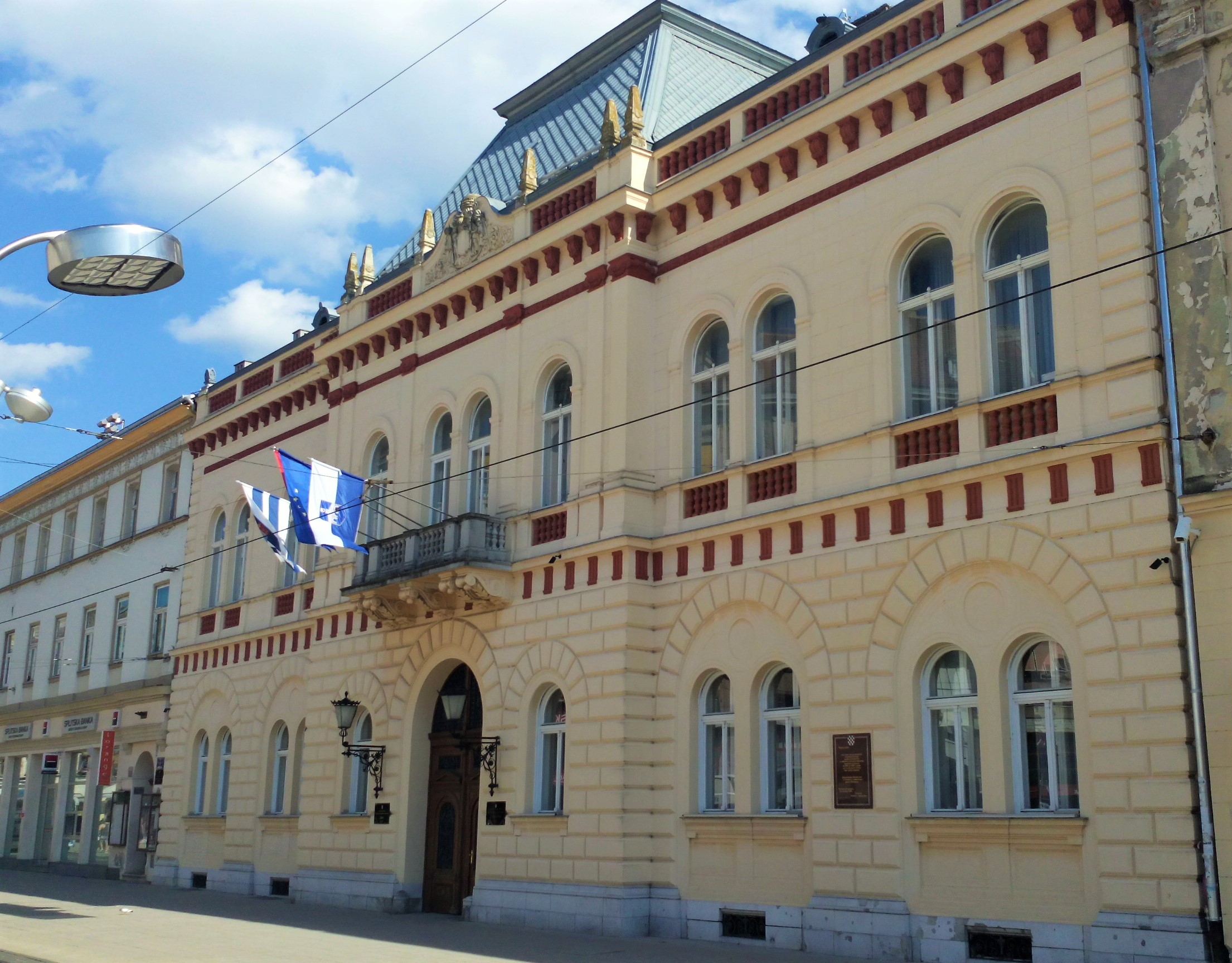
Normann Palace in Osijek (1891–1894)

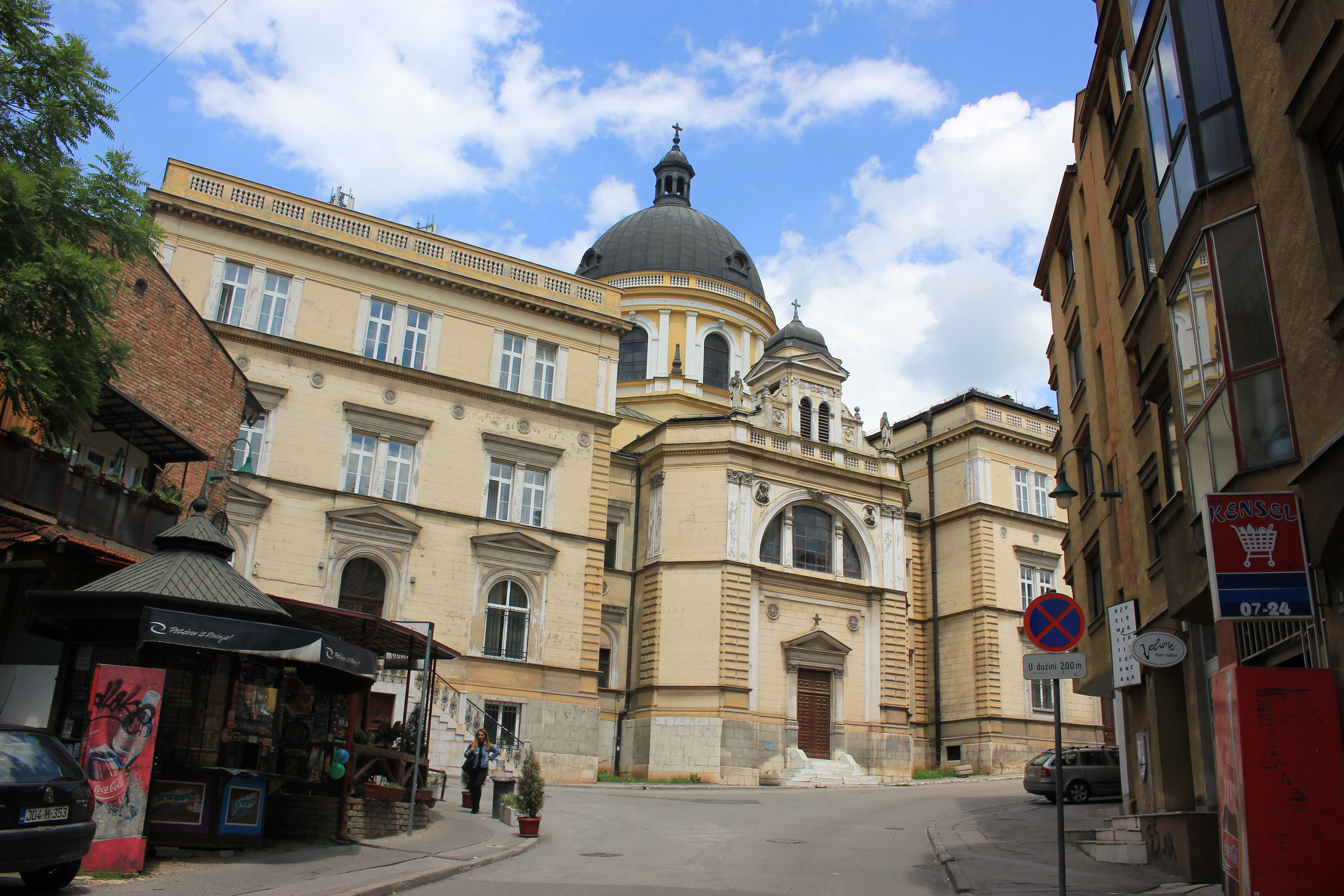
Seminary of St. Cyril and Methodius in Sarajevo (1892–1896)

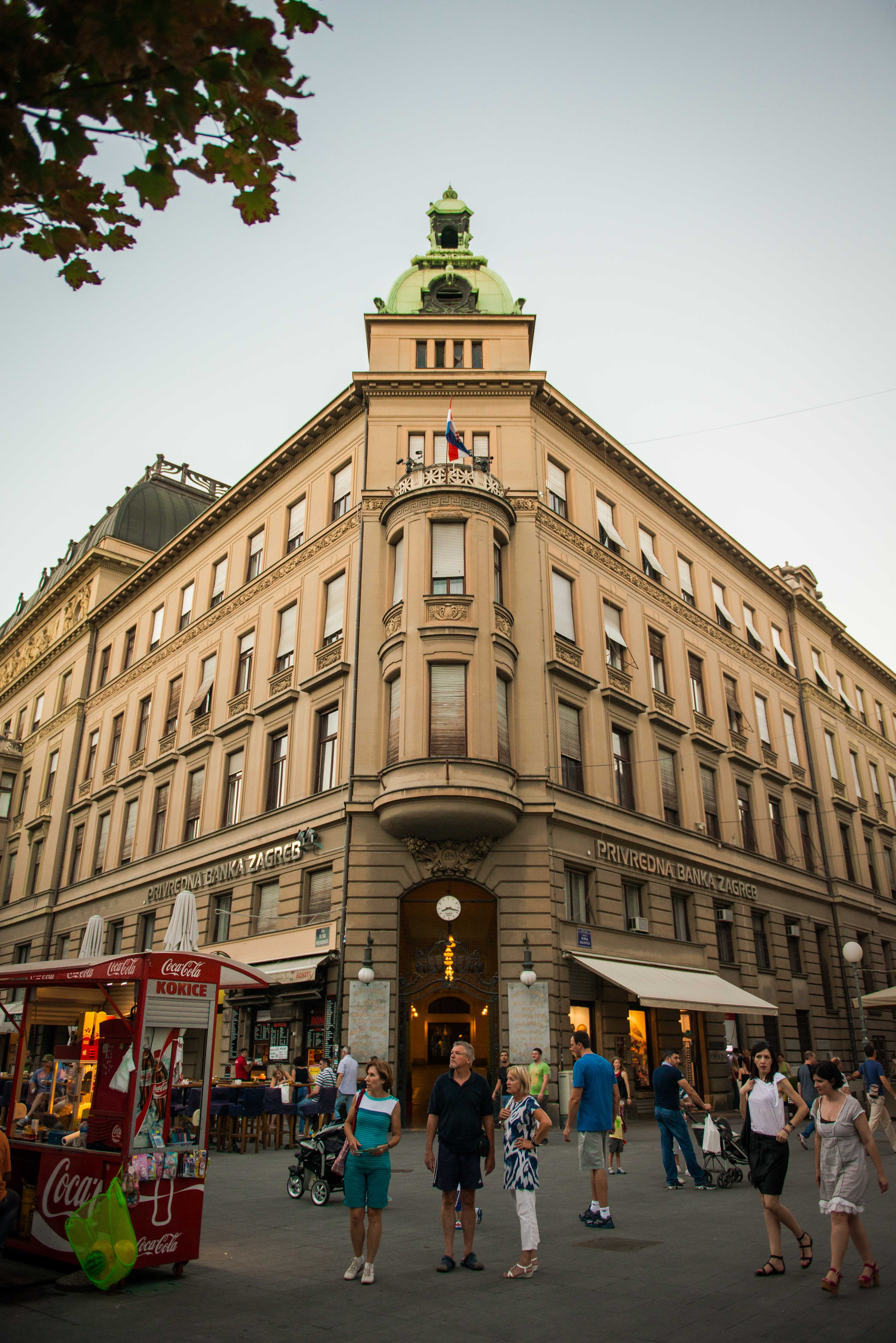
The First Croatian Savings Bank in Zagreb (1898–1900)

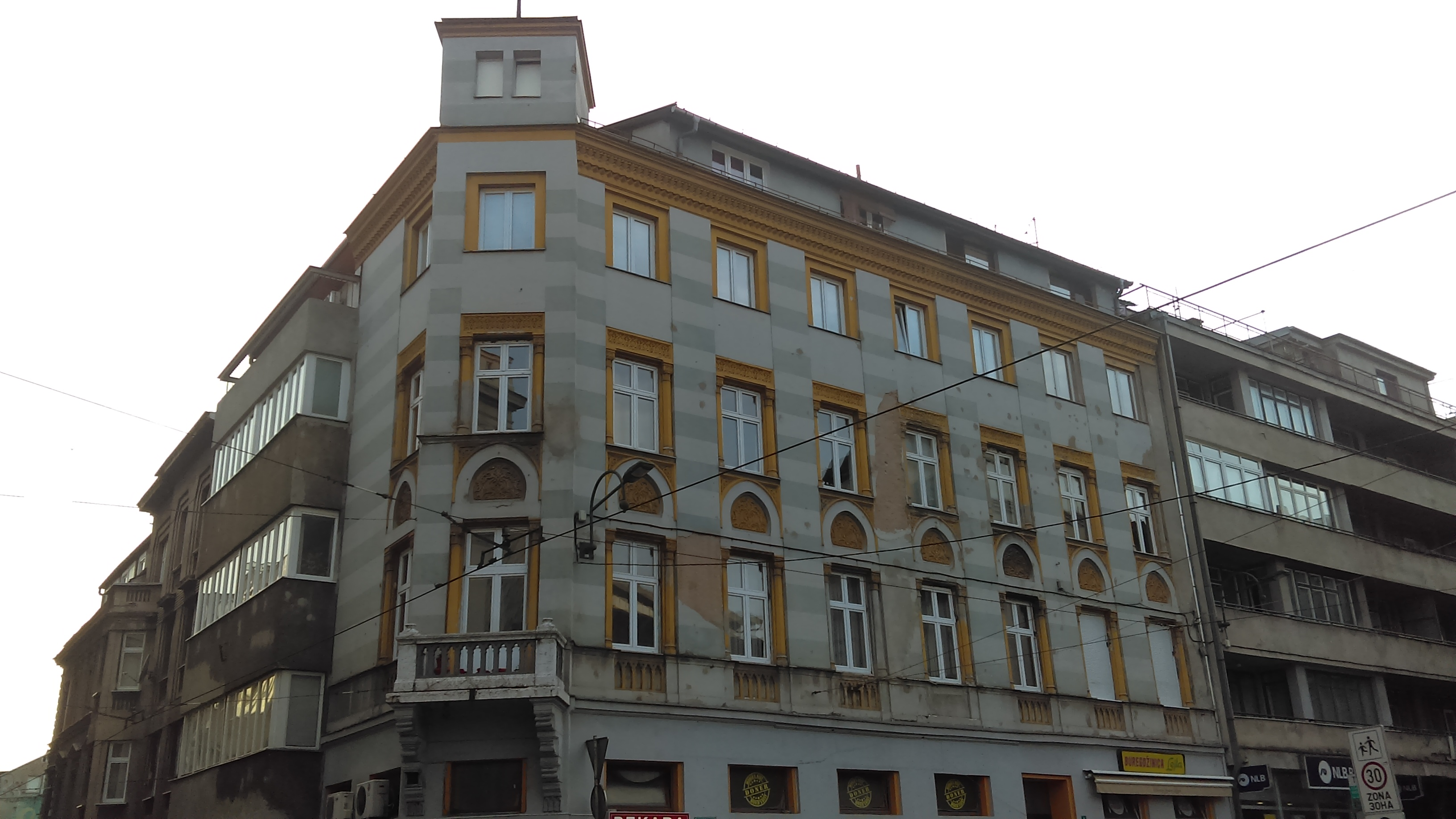
Commercial building "Đenetić", Sarajevo (1898)

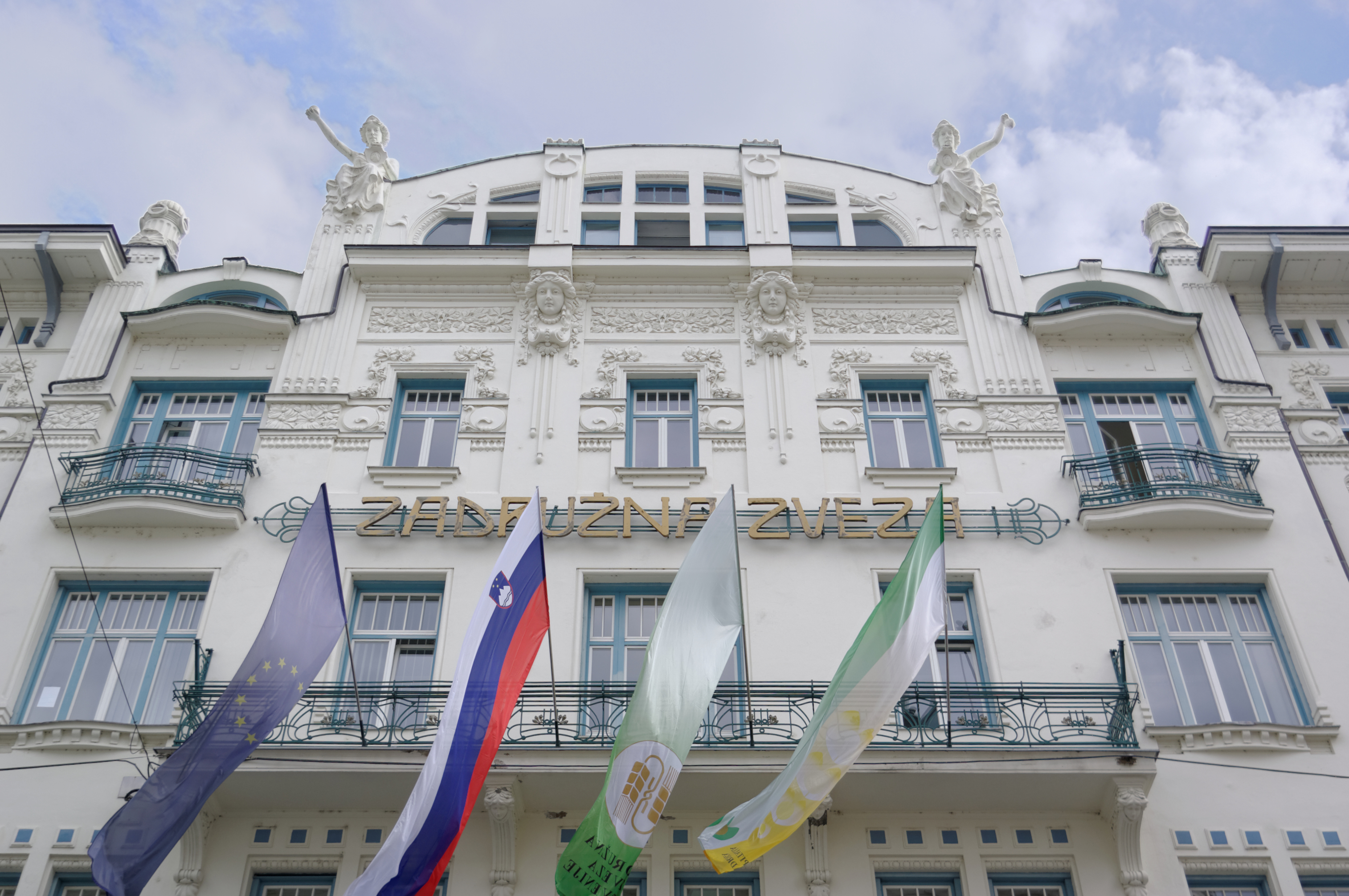
People's Loan Bank, Ljubljana (1900–1907)

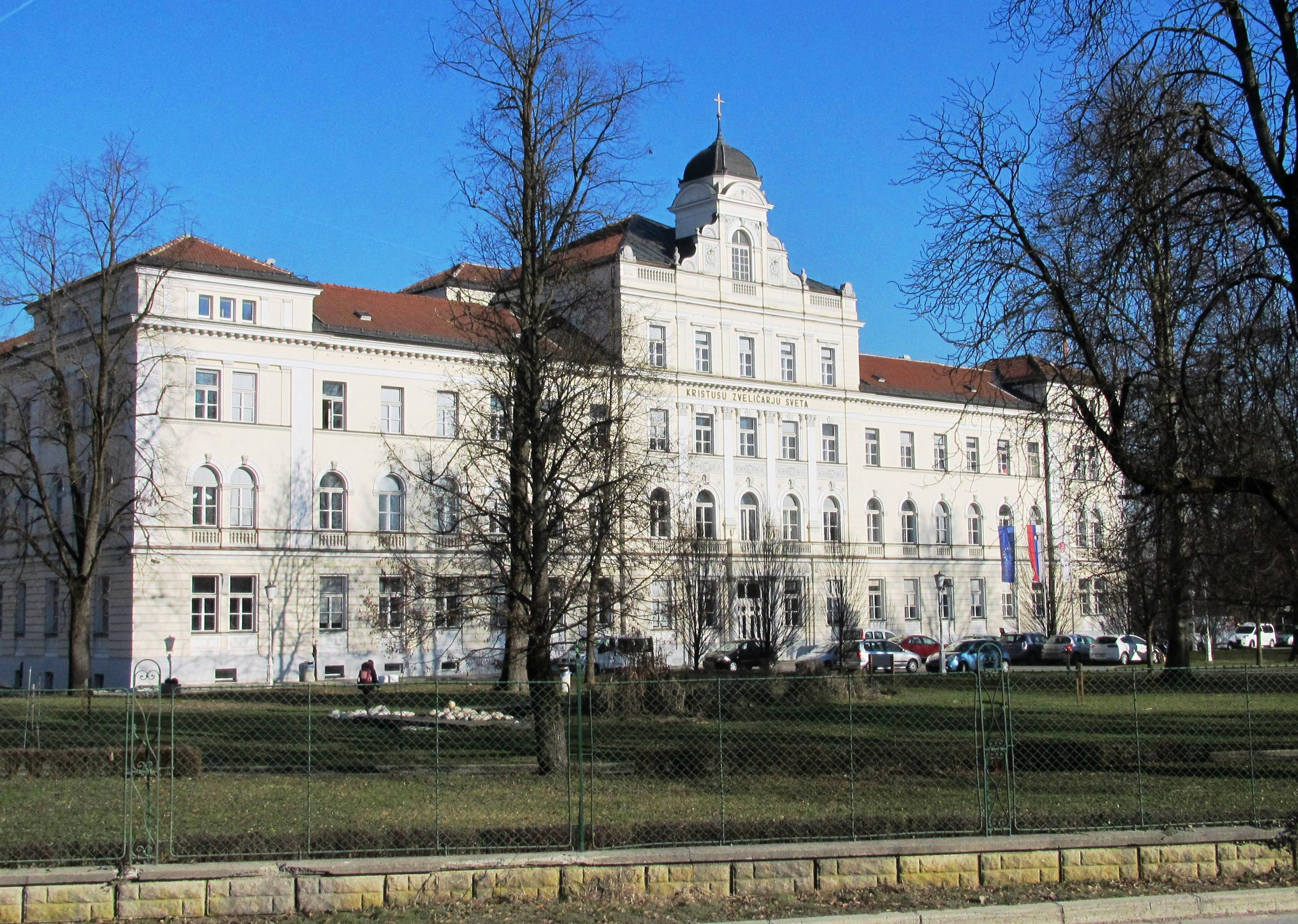
St. Stanislaus Institute in Ljubljana (1901–1905)

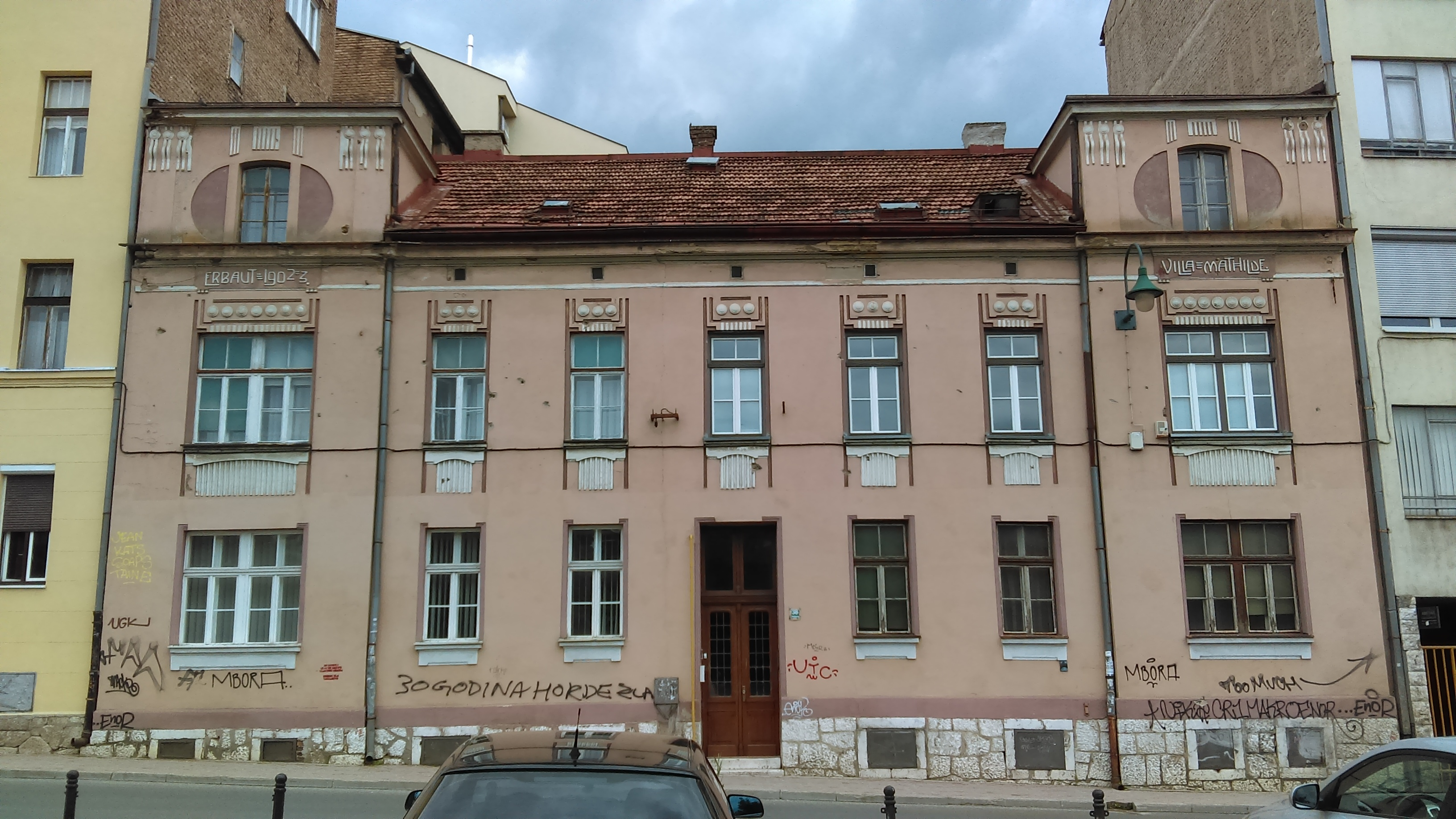
Villa Mathilde in Sarajevo (1902–1903)

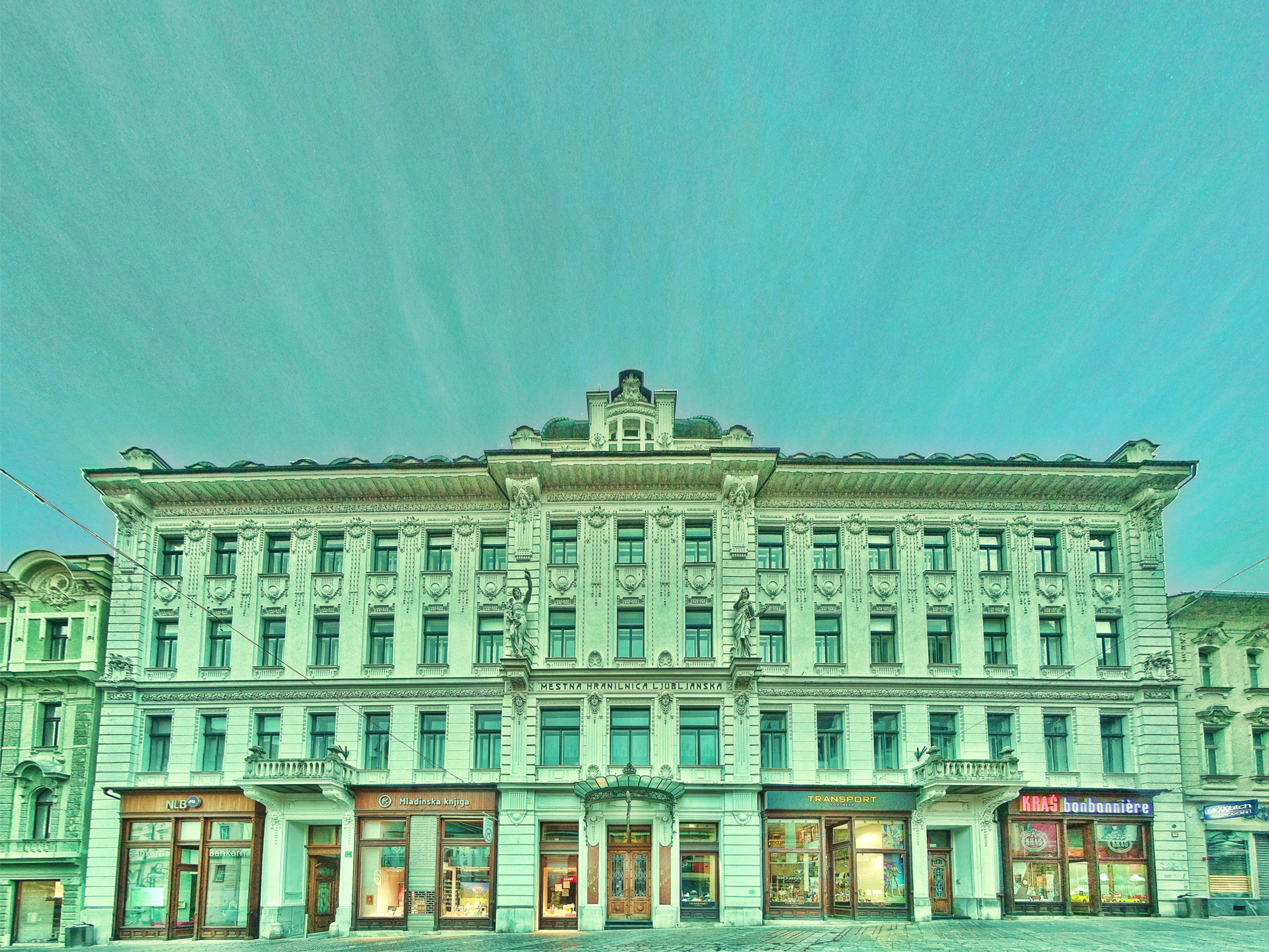
City Savings Bank in Ljubljana (1902–1903)

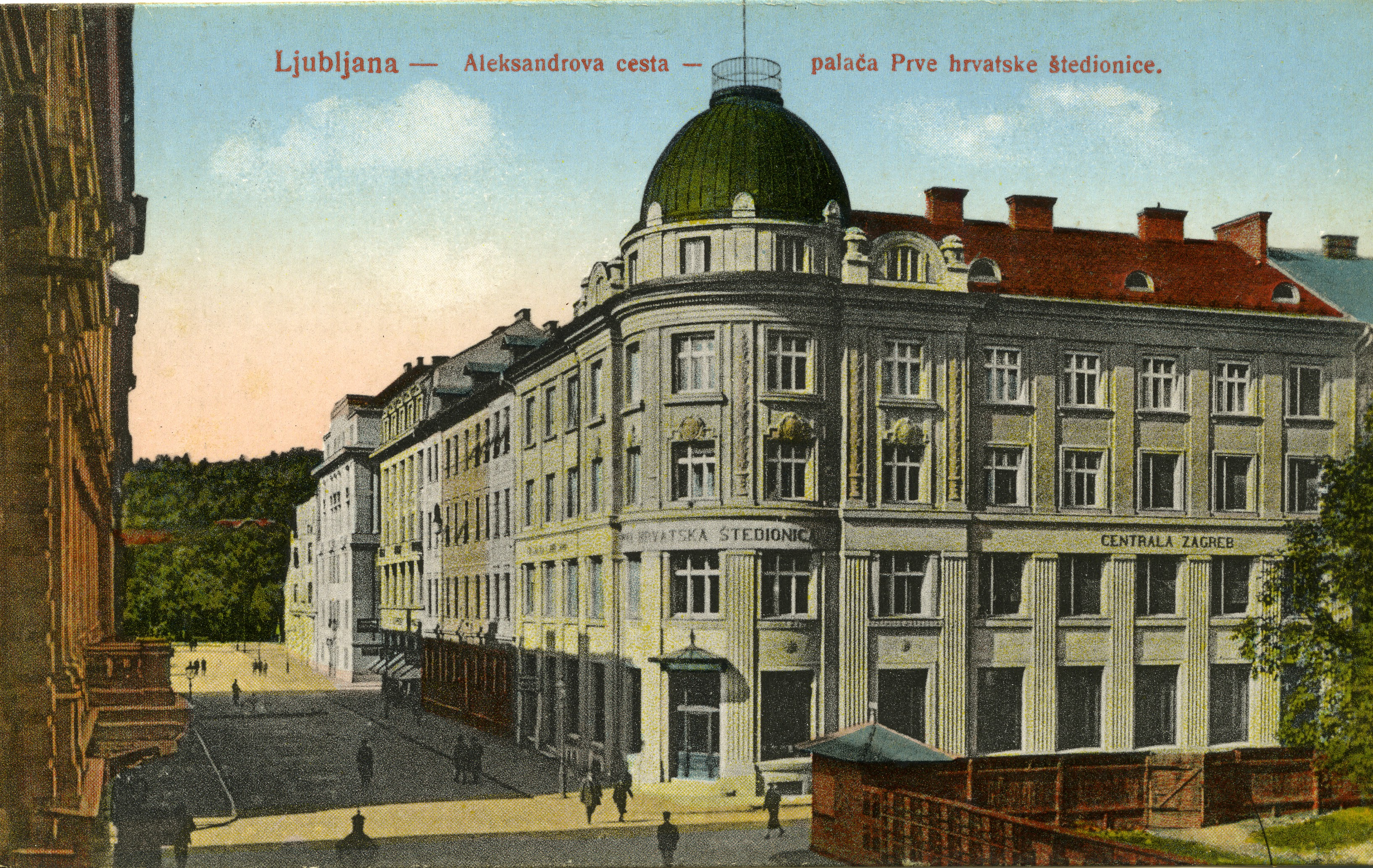
The First Croatian Savings Bank in Ljubljana (1902–1903)

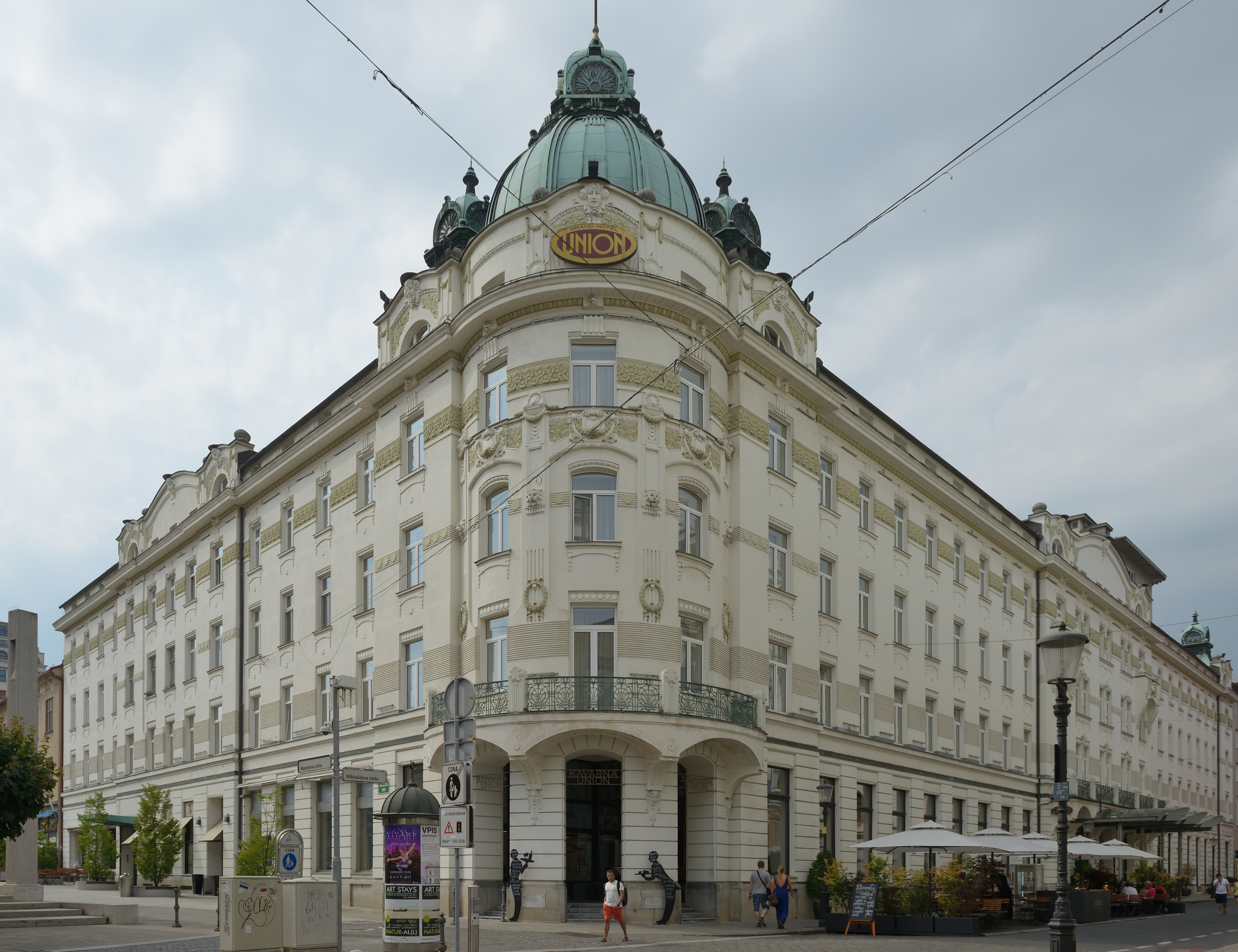
Grand Hotel Union in Ljubljana (1902–1903)

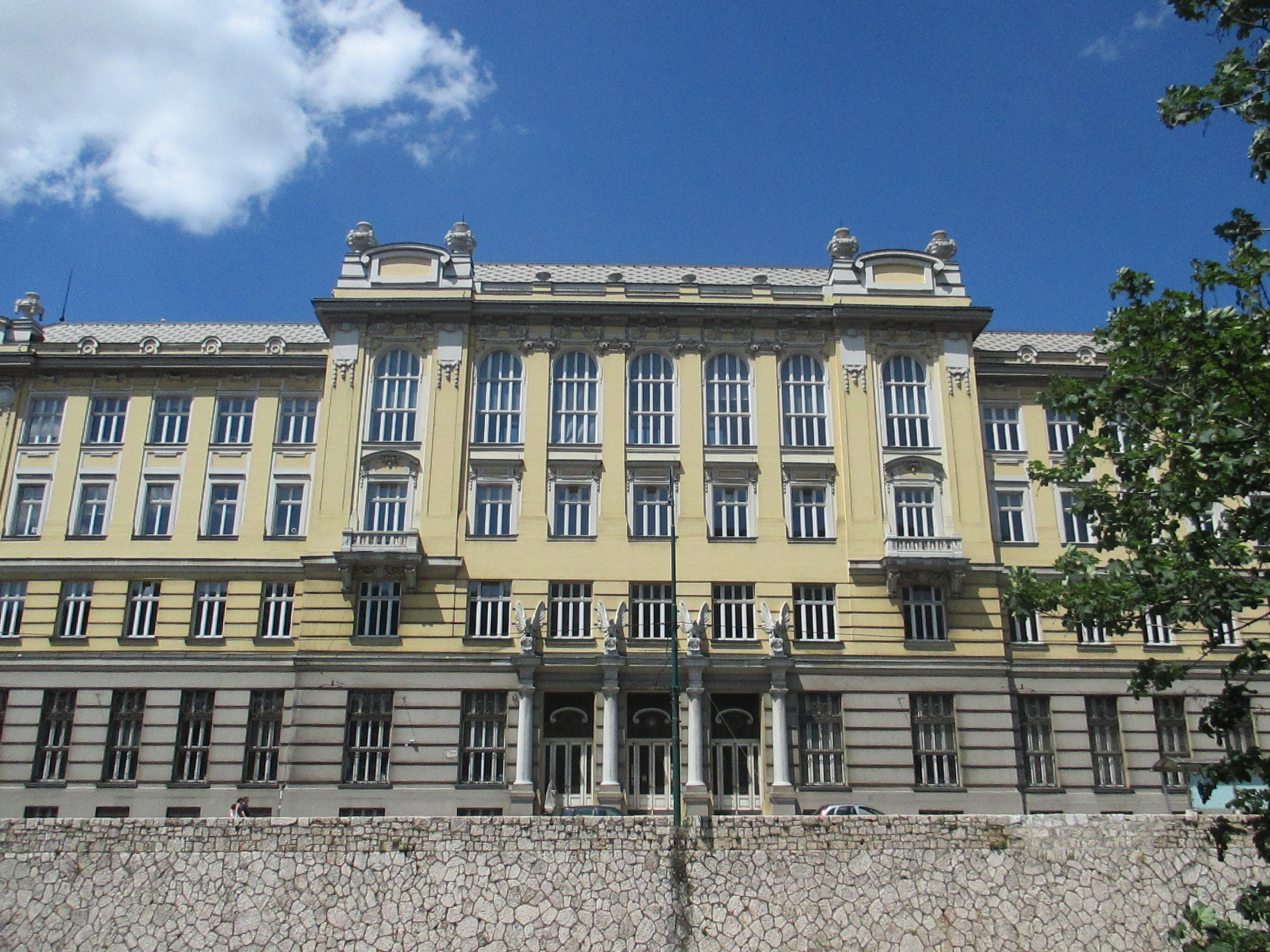
Central Post Office in Sarajevo (1907–1913)

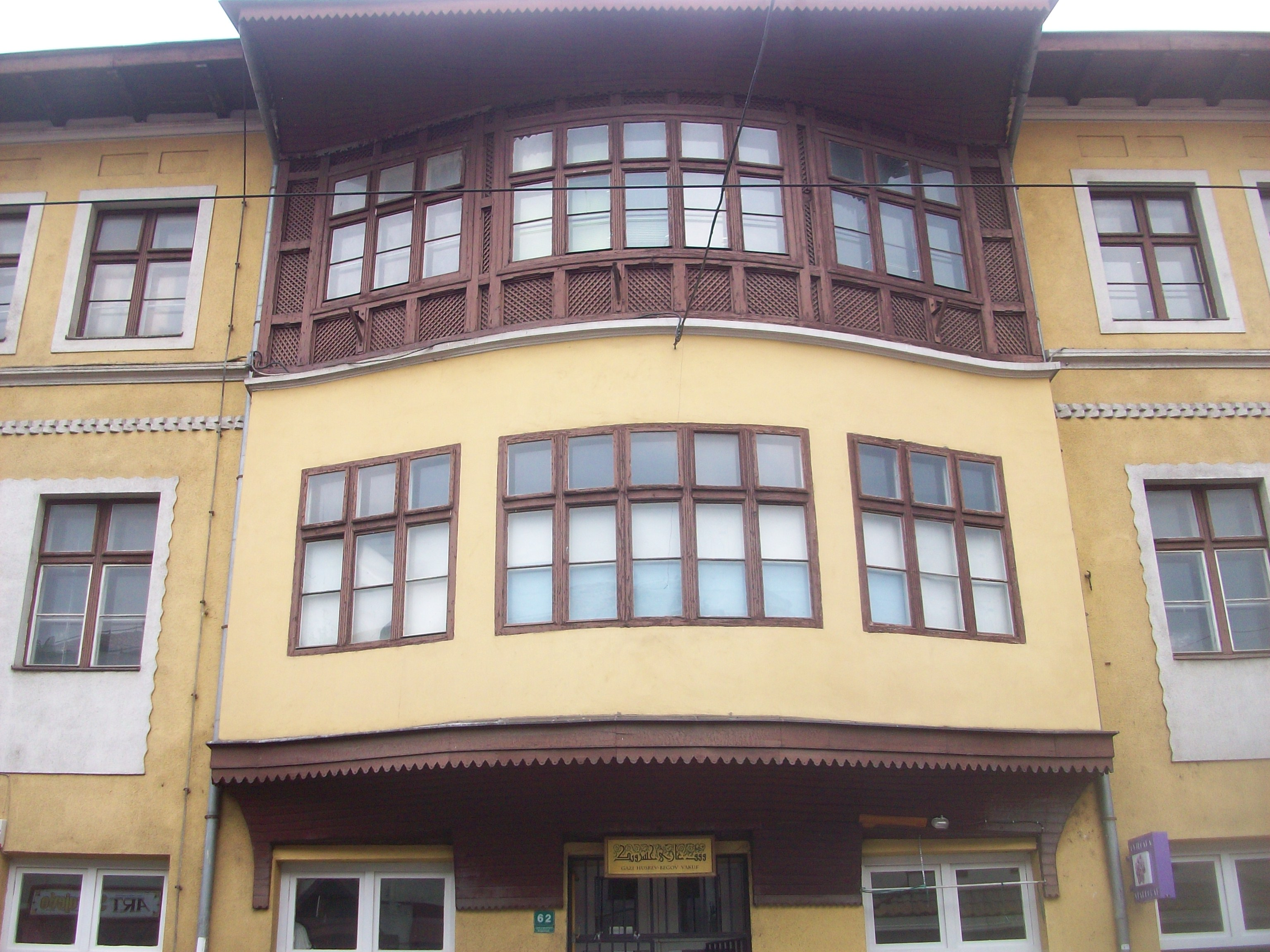
Hotel Stari Grad, Sarajevo (1909)

== See also ==
- František Blažek
- Karel Pařík
- Alexander Wittek
- Juraj Neidhardt
- Architecture of Mostar
- Bosnian style in architecture
