= Močioci, Stari Grad =

Močioci
- Village
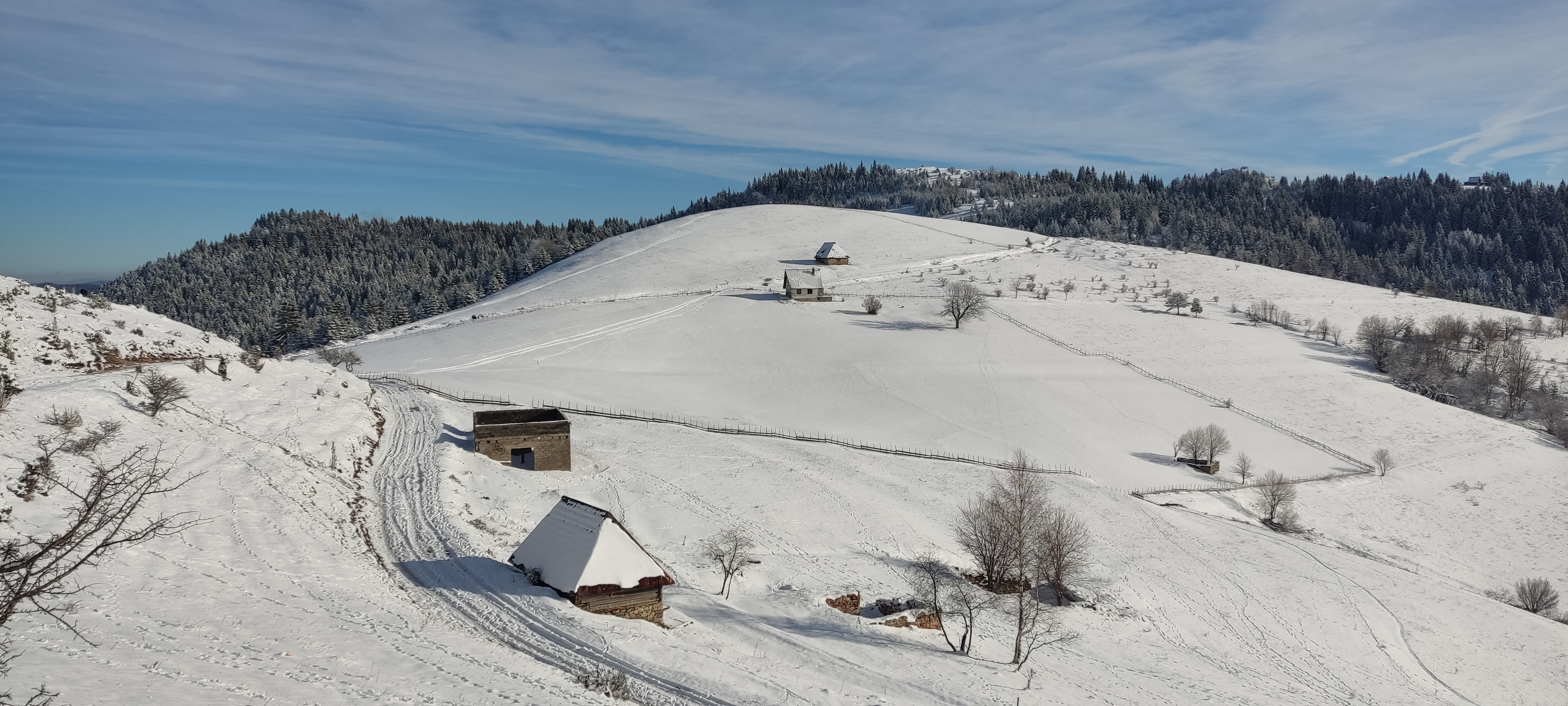
- Močioci in winter

- Location within Bosnia and Herzegovina
- Coordinates: 43°55′34″N 18°27′22″E
- Country: Bosnia and Herzegovina
- Entity: Federation of Bosnia and Herzegovina
- Canton: Sarajevo
- Municipality: Stari Grad Sarajevo

Area
  - Total: 5.77 sq mi (14.95 km^{2})

Population (2013)
  - Total: 5
  - Density: 0.87/sq mi (0.33/km^{2})
- Time zone: UTC+1 (CET)
  - Summer (DST): UTC+2 (CEST)

Močioci is a village in Bosnia and Herzegovina. According to the 1991 census, the village is located in the municipality of Stari Grad, Sarajevo.

== Demographics ==
According to the 2013 census, its population was 5, all Serbs.
