= Močioci, Serbia =

Coordinates: 43.5450°N 19.9606°E

Močioci
- Village
- Interactive map of Močioci
- Country: Serbia
- District: Moravica District
- Municipality: Ivanjica

Area
  - Total: 4.62 km^{2} (1.78 sq mi)

Population (2011)
  - Total: 112
  - Density: 24.2/km^{2} (62.8/sq mi)
- Time zone: UTC+1 (CET)
  - Summer (DST): UTC+2 (CEST)

Močioci is a village in the municipality of Ivanjica, Serbia. According to the 2011 census, the village has a population of 112 inhabitants.
