= List of People's Heroes of Yugoslavia monuments in Slovenia =

There were 1,322 individuals who were decorated by the Order of the People's hero of Yugoslavia between 1942 and 1973. Many busts and memorials were built in honor of each People's hero. Each of them usually had a bust in his birthplace or at the place of his death. Most of these monuments are built in figurative style, but some of them were completely abstract, for example, monument of Ivo Lola Ribar, built at Glamoč field in 1962.

== Monument list ==
Image	Name	Location	Notes
	Monument of Josip Broz Tito	Velenje, Slovenia	Dedicated to Josip Broz Tito, leader of the People's liberation struggle, a triple People's hero of Yugoslavia and the president of SFR Yugoslavia (1953–1980).
	Monument of Edvard Kardelj	Ljubljana, Slovenia	Designed by Drago Tršar, built in 1981.
	Monument of Boris Kidrič	Ljubljana, Slovenia	Built in 1959.
	Monument of Boris Kidrič	Maribor, Slovenia	Designed by Stojan Batič, built in 1963.
	Monument of Anton Tomšič - Tone	Ljubljana, Slovenia	Designed by Boris Kalin.
	Bust of Franc Rozman – Stane	Novo Mesto, Slovenia	
	Bust of Jakob Molek - Mohor	Kamnik, Slovenia	
	Bust of Majda Vrhovnik	Ljubljana, Slovenia	Designed by Stojan Batič, built in 1961.
	Bust of Janko Premrl	Slovenia	
	Bust of Josip Broz Tito	Ljubljana, Slovenia	

== See also ==
- List of People's Heroes of Yugoslavia monuments
- List of People's Heroes of Yugoslavia monuments in Bosnia and Herzegovina
- List of People's Heroes of Yugoslavia monuments in North Macedonia
- List of People's Heroes of Yugoslavia monuments in Serbia
- List of Yugoslav World War II monuments and memorials
- List of World War II monuments and memorials in Bosnia and Herzegovina
- List of World War II monuments and memorials in Croatia
- List of World War II monuments and memorials in North Macedonia
- List of World War II monuments and memorials in Serbia
- List of World War II monuments and memorials in Slovenia
