= Lists of war monuments and memorials =

The following are lists of war memorials and monuments sorted by continent and by country.

== Australia ==
- List of Australian military memorials

== Canada ==
- List of Canadian war memorials

== Belgium ==
- List of World War I memorials and cemeteries in Flanders

== Bosnia and Herzegovina ==
- List of World War II monuments and memorials in Bosnia and Herzegovina

== Croatia ==
- List of World War II monuments and memorials in Croatia

== France ==
- List of World War I memorials and cemeteries in Champagne-Ardennes

== Montenegro ==
- List of Yugoslav World War II monuments and memorials in Montenegro

== North Macedonia ==
- List of World War II monuments and memorials in North Macedonia

== Serbia ==
- List of Yugoslav World War II monuments and memorials in Serbia

== Slovenia ==
- List of World War II monuments and memorials in Slovenia

== United Kingdom ==
- Grade I listed war memorials in England
- Grade II* listed war memorials in England
- List of War Memorial windows by Christopher Whall

== United States ==
- List of Confederate monuments and memorials
- List of Union Civil War monuments and memorials
- List of Vietnam War memorials
- List of monuments of the Gettysburg Battlefield

== See also ==
- List of Korean War memorials
- List of World War I monuments and memorials
