= List of World War II monuments and memorials in North Macedonia =

The list of World War II monuments and memorials in North Macedonia represents monuments and memorials built on the territory of the present-day North Macedonia during the times of Communist Yugoslavia.

== History ==
The Yugoslav communist authorities established several memorial sites between 1945 and 1960, though widespread building started after the founding of the Non-Aligned Movement.

Yugoslav president Josip Broz Tito commissioned several memorial sites and monuments in the 1960s and 70s dedicated to World War II battle, and concentration camp sites. They were designed by notable sculptors, including Dušan Džamonja, Vojin Bakić, Miodrag Živković, Jordan and Iskra Grabul, and architects, including Bogdan Bogdanović, Gradimir Medaković. After Tito's death, a small number was built, and the monuments were popular visitor attractions in the 1980s as patriotic sites, and since the Yugoslav Wars and the dissolution of Yugoslavia, the sites are abandoned and have lost their importance.

The list houses monuments and memorials built between 1945 and 1991, and does not include busts or other statues of individuals (see bottom).

Image	Name	Location	Notes
	“Makedonium”	Kruševo	Designed by Jordan and Iskra Grabuloska, built in 1974. dedicated to fallen fighters of Ilinden Uprising and People's liberation struggle.
	Mausoleum of the fallen fighters and victims of fascism	Kavadarci	
	Mausoleum of the fallen fighters and victims of fascism	Kičevo	Designed by Jordan Grabuloski, built in 1963.
	Monument to the "Unbeaten"	Prilep	Designed by Bogdan Bogdanović, built in 1961.
	Monument to fallen fighters	Near Belčišta	Designed by Jordan Grabuloski, built in 1958.
	Monument to freedom	Gevgelija	Designed by Jordan Grabuloski, built in 1969.
	Monument of Skopje's Liberators	Skopje	Designed by Ivan Mirković; built in 1955.
	Monument to People's liberation struggle	Skopje	Designed by Jordan Grabuloski; built in 1965.
	Memorial Complex "Soldiers Fallen for the Revolution"	Štip	Designed by Bogdan Bogdanović, built from 1969 to 1974. Resting place of 814 Yugoslav partisans' fighters.
	Monument to fallen fighters	Skopje	
	Memorial Ossuary	Near Kumanovo	Designed by Sreten Stojanović and Kosta Zordumis, built in 1957.
	Monument to the Revolution	Center of Kumanovo	Designed by Kosta Angeli Radovani, built in 1962.
	Monument to the Revolution	Strumica	
	Monument to the Revolution	Bitola	
	Monument to fallen fighters	Struga	Designed by Vojislav Vasiljević.
	Monument to fallen fighters	Delčevo	
	Monument to fallen fighters	Belčišta	
	Monument to Freedom	Kočani	Designed by Gligor Čemerski, built in 1977. Dedicated to fallen fighters from Kočani and neighbouring places.
	Monument to fallen fighters	Debar	
	Monument to fallen fighters	Železnec	
	Monument to fallen fighters	Zubovce	
	Monument to victims of fascism	Rusjaci	Dedicated to fighters of the First Macedonia-Kosovo Proletarian Brigade that were slaughtered by the Bulgarian army soldiers in November 1943.
	Monument to fallen fighters	Podmočani	Built in 1975.
	Monument to fallen fighters	Mordič	Built in 1977.
	Monument to women fighters of the People's liberation war	Tetovo	Designed by Borka Avramova, built in 1961. Dedicated to all women that fought in People's liberation war 1941–1945.
	Monument to fallen fighters	Brvenica	
	Monument to fallen fighters	Radiovce	
	Monument to fallen fighters	Stenče	Built in 1980.
	Monument to deported Jews	Štip	Dedicated to 561 Jews of Štip who were deported in Treblinka concentration camp in the march of 1943.
	Partisan Cemetery	Kruševo	
	Partisan Cemetery	Ohrid	
	Memorial to the Presidium of ASNOM	Skopje	Designed by Slobodan Miloševski, built in 2012.

== See also ==
- People's Heroes of Yugoslavia monuments
- List of Yugoslav World War II monuments and memorials
- List of World War II monuments and memorials in Bosnia and Herzegovina
- List of World War II monuments and memorials in Croatia
- List of World War II monuments and memorials in Montenegro
- List of World War II monuments and memorials in Serbia
- List of World War II monuments and memorials in Slovenia
