= List of Yugoslav World War II monuments and memorials in Serbia =

This is a list of monuments and memorials dedicated to the National Liberation Movement, its fighters and its victims in the World War II in Yugoslavia, built on the territory of the present day Serbia, including those in the autonomous provinces of Vojvodina and Kosovo and Metohija.

This list does not include busts or other statues of individuals (see bottom).

== History ==
The Yugoslav authorities established several memorial sites between 1945 and 1960, though widespread building started after the founding of the Non-Aligned Movement.

Yugoslav president Josip Broz Tito commissioned several memorial sites and monuments in the 1960s and 70s dedicated to World War II battle, and concentration camp sites. They were designed by notable sculptors, including Dušan Džamonja, Vojin Bakić, Miodrag Živković, Jordan and Iskra Grabul, and architects, including Bogdan Bogdanović, Nebojša Delja, Gradimir Medaković. After Tito's death, a small number were built, and the monuments were popular visitor attractions in the 1980s as patriotic sites, and since the Yugoslav Wars and the dissolution of Yugoslavia, the sites are abandoned and have lost their importance.

== List ==
Image	Name	Location	Coordinates	Notes
	Kadinjača Memorial	Kadinjača, Užice	43.91194°N 19.74222°E	Commemoration of the Battle of Kadinjača on 29 November 1941. Designed by Miodrag Živković and Aleksandar Đokić. The entire memorial complex was officially opened by President Josip Broz Tito on 23 September 1979.
	Popina Memorial	Štulac, Vrnjačka Banja		Designed by Bogdan Bogdanović.
	Memorial Park Peace Hill	Gornji Milanovac		
	Memorial cemetery in Belgrade	Belgrade		
	Memorial cemetery in Sremska Mitrovica	Sremska Mitrovica		Designed by Bogdan Bogdanović.
	Tomb of People's Heroes, Belgrade	Belgrade		
	Slobodište	Kruševac		Designed by Bogdan Bogdanović.
	Šumarice Memorial Park	Kragujevac		Memorial to Kragujevac massacre. The focal sculpture was designed by Miodrag Živković.
	Monument to Kosmaj Partisan Detachment	Belgrade		Dedicated to the "Kosmaj Partisan detachment" of World War II. One of two monuments on top of Kosmaj mountain (the other is dedicated to World War I fallen Serbian soldiers).
	Shrine to the fallen freedom fighters	Vlasotince		By Bogdan Bogdanović, 1975.
	Kosovska Mitrovica Monument	Kosovska Mitrovica		By Bogdan Bogdanović, 1973. Dedicated to the Serb and Albanian Partisans of World War II.
	Monument "Three fists"	Niš		Designed by Ivan Sabolić; built in 1963. Dedicated to victims of fascism killed at Bubanj plateau near Niš between 1941 and 1944.
	Monument to fallen fighters	Priština, Kosovo		Designed by Miodrag Živković; built in 1961.
	Memorial to the Battle of Prijepolje	Prijepolje		Designed by Lojze Dolinar, built in 1953. Dedicated to fallen Yugoslav partisans in the battle of Prijepolje in 1943.
	Monument to fallen fighters	Prokuplje		
	Memorial Park of Struggle and Victory	Čačak		Designed by Bogdan Bogdanović, 1976-1980. Dedicated to 4,650 fallen partisan fighters and victims of fascism from Čačak killed during World War II.
	Monument to victims of fascism	Jajinci Memorial Park		Designed by Stevan Bodnarov, built in 1951. Dedicated to the prisoners of Sajmište concentration camp, who were executed by Germans at this location.
	Monument to hanged patriots	Beograd		Built at Terazije square, where German soldiers hanged a group of antifascists in August 1941.
	Monument “Freedom”	Iriški Venac		Designed by Sreten Stojanović, built in 1961.
	Monument to victims of fascism	Novi Sad		Designed by Jovan Soldatović, built in 1971. Dedicated to victims of fascism killed by Hungarian fascists in 1942 raid in southern Bačka.
	Black Ćuprija	Žabalj		Designed by Jovan Soldatović. Dedicated to victims of fascism killed by Hungarian fascists in 1942 raid in southern Bačka.
	Monument to fallen fighters	Sićevo		
	Monument to Syrmian front	Šid		
	Monument to fallen fighters	Beočin		
	Monument to fallen fighters	Bajina Bašta		
	Monument to fallen fighters and victims of fascism	Jabukovac, near Negotin		
	Monument to fallen fighters and victims of fascism	Tovariševo		
	Monument to fallen fighters and victims of fascism	Stara Moravica		
	Monument to fallen fighters	Rakovac		
	Monument to fallen fighters	Bosut		
	Monument to fallen fighters	Futog		
	Monument to fallen fighters and victims of fascism	Jabuka		
	Monument to fallen fighters	Kać		
	Monument to fallen fighters	Velika Greda		
	Monument to fallen fighters and victims of fascism	Ruma		
	Monument to fallen fighters	Sremska Kamenica		
	Monument to fallen fighters	Stara Pazova		
	Monument to Freedom	Temerin		Dedicated to fallen fighters.
	Monument to fallen fighters	Šušara		
	Monument to fallen fighters and victims of fascism	Banatsko Karađorđevo		
	Monument to Serbian and Albanian fallen fighters	Pristina, Kosovo		
	Monument to fallen fighters	Kuršumlija		
	Monument to fallen fighters	Ledinci		
	Monument to fallen fighters	Ljig		
	Monument to fallen fighters	Kosmaj		
	Memorial plaque to Partisan fighters and the beginning of antifascist resistance in South Serbia	Čukljenik		
	Monument to fallen fighters.	Adaševci		
	Monument to fallen fighters.	Batrovci		
	Monument to fallen fighters.	Bačinci		
	Monument to fallen fighters.	Bikić Do		
	Monument to fallen fighters and victims of Fascism.	Šid		
	Memorial plaque to Miladin Zorić-Garača.	Šid		
	Monument to fallen fighters.	Bingula		
	Memorial Park of the Revolution.	Leskovac		Designed by Bogdan Bogdanović.
	Monument to fallen fighters.	Drenovac		
	World War II monument.	Martinci		
	World War II monument.	Čalma		
	World War II monument.	Salaš Noćajski		
	World War II monument.	Radenković		
	World War II monument.	Ravnje		
	World War II monument.	Noćaj		
	World War II monument.	Ležimir		
	World War II monument.	Laćarak		
	World War II monument.	Kuzmin		
	World War II monument.	Jarak		
	World War II monument.	Zasavica I		
	World War II monument.	Divoš		
	World War II monument.	Grgurevci		
	World War II monument.	Veliki Radinci		
	World War II monument.	Bačka Palanka		
	World War II monument.	Tovariševo		
	World War II monument.	Neštin		
	World War II monument.	Čelarevo		
	World War II monument.	Bačko Novo Selo		
	World War II monument.	Sviloš		
	World War II monument.	Rakovac		
	World War II monument.	Grabovo		
	World War II monument.	Čerević		
	World War II monument.	Surduk		
	World War II monument.	Stari Banovci		
	World War II monument.	Novi Banovci		
	World War II monument.	Belegiš		
	World War II monument.	Stejanovci		
	World War II monument.	Platičevo		
	World War II monument.	Kraljevci		
	World War II monument.	Buđanovci		
	World War II monument.	Pećinci		
	World War II monument.	Subotište		
	World War II monument.	Sremski Mihaljevci		
	World War II monument.	Karlovčić		
	World War II monument.	Jazak		
	World War II monument.	Jazak		
	World War II monument.	Vrdnik		
	World War II monument.	Čortanovci		
	World War II monument.	Krčedin		
	World War II monument.	Beška		
	World War II monument.	Apatin		
	World War II monument.	Kula		
	World War II monument.	Sivac		
	World War II monument.	Ruski Krstur		
	World War II monument.	Lalić		
	World War II monument.	Čenej		
	World War II monument.	Futog		
	World War II monument.	Veternik		
	World War II monument.	Kisač		
	World War II monument.	Begeč		
	World War II monument.	Bački Petrovac		
	World War II monument.	Gložan		
	World War II monument.	Bečej		
	World War II monument.	Bečej		
	World War II monument.	Bačko Gradište		
	World War II monument.	Bačko Gradište		
	World War II monument.	Sremski Karlovci		
	World War II monument.	Titel		
	World War II monument.	Vrbas		
	World War II monument.	Vrbas		
	World War II monument.	Vrbas		

== See also ==
- People's Heroes of Yugoslavia monuments
- List of Yugoslav World War II monuments and memorials
- List of World War II monuments and memorials in Bosnia and Herzegovina
- List of World War II monuments and memorials in Croatia
- List of World War II monuments and memorials in Montenegro
- List of World War II monuments and memorials in North Macedonia
- List of World War II monuments and memorials in Slovenia
