= List of World War II monuments and memorials in Bosnia and Herzegovina =

List of World War II monuments and memorials in Bosnia and Herzegovina includes Yugoslav monuments and memorials build on the territory of the present day Bosnia and Herzegovina.

== History ==
The Yugoslav authorities established several memorial sites between 1945 and 1960, though widespread building started after the founding of the Non-Aligned Movement.

Yugoslav president Josip Broz Tito commissioned several memorial sites and monuments in the 1960s and 70s dedicated to World War II battle and concentration camp sites. They were designed by notable sculptors, including Dušan Džamonja, Vojin Bakić, Miodrag Živković, Jordan and Iskra Grabul, and architects, including Bogdan Bogdanović, Gradimir Medaković. After Tito's death, a small number were built, and the monuments were popular visitor attractions in the 1980s as patriotic sites, and since the Yugoslav Wars and the dissolution of Yugoslavia, the sites have been abandoned and have lost their importance.

The list includes monuments and memorials built between 1945 and 1991, but does not include busts or other statues of individuals (see bottom).

== List ==
Image	Name	Location	Coordinates	Notes
Vraca Memorial Park	Vraca Memorial Park	Sarajevo	43.8435°N 18.3981°E	Rehabilitation of old Austro-Hungarian fortress with combined work of Vladimir Dobrović as designer, Alija Kučukalić as sculptor, and Aleksandar Maltarić as landscaper, opened on 25 November 1981.
Partisan cemetery in Mostar	Partisan cemetery in Mostar	Mostar	43.341389°N 17.796389°E	Designed by Bogdan Bogdanović, built in 1965.
Monument to the Revolution	Monument to the Revolution	Kozara	45.0125°N 16.911111°E	Also known as the Mrakovica Memorial, dedicated to the Battle of Kozara. Designed by Dušan Džamonja. Completed in 1972.
Kolodvorska Memorial Park	Kolodvorska Memorial Park	Sarajevo	43.8547°N 18.387489°E	
	Majka Partizanka	Novi Grad	45.0479690°N 16.3795213°E	
Monument to fallen Krajina soldiers	Monument to fallen Krajina soldiers	Banja Luka	44.744056°N 17.162861°E	Dedicated to the National Liberation War of the people of Bosanska Krajina. Designed by Antun Augustinčić and inaugurated in 1961.
Monument to victims of fascism	Monument to victims of fascism	Fojnica	43.855375°N 18.404128°E	Dedicated to the first liberation of the town during the Second World War on 2 September 1942.
	The Battle of Sutjeska Memorial Monument Complex in the Valley of Heroes	Tjentište	43.346111°N 18.686833°E	Dedicated to the fighters and dead during the Battle of the Sutjeska in 1943. It was created by Miodrag Živković and was constructed in 1971. 3,301 combatants are buried in an ossuary in front of the monument.
Necropolis for the victims of Fascism	Necropolis for the victims of Fascism	Novi Travnik	44.196386°N 17.691042°E	Designed by Bogdan Bogdanović, opened in 1975.
Grmeč	Monument to the Revolution	Grmeč	44.68725°N 16.437639°E	Located in the Korčanica Memorial Zone of Grmeč Mountain. Dedicated to a secret hospital run by the Partisan resistance on the hill's slopes during WWII. Designed by Ljubomir Denković, opened in 1979.
	Bratunac Memorial Park	Bratunac	44.184111°N 19.32875°E	
Garavice Memorial Park	Garavice Memorial Park	Bihać	44.822222°N 15.840083°E	Dedicated to the thousands of ethnic-Serb and Jewish people, including children, who were killed on this hill by Ustaše forces in July 1941. Designed by Bogdan Bogdanović, built in 1981. Declared a National Monument of Bosnia & Herzegovina in 2011.
Eternal flame	Eternal flame	Sarajevo	43.858812°N 18.421872°E	Built in 1946. Dedicated to Yugoslav army liberators of Sarajevo in 1945.
Monument to the Fallen Partisan Detachment from Zenica	Monument to the Fallen Partisan Detachment from Zenica	Zenica	44.24475°N 17.959667°E	Built in 1968. Honors the Zenica Partisan Detachment soldiers who lost their lives in May 1942 while fighting the Axis and Chetnik forces.
	Monument to the Fallen Fighters of People's Liberation War	Vogošća	43.899417°N 18.35°E	Designed by Zlatko Ugljen, built in 1969. Commemorates 62 Partisan fighters and Illegal Workers.
	WW2 Monument	Teočak		
	Monument to fallen fighters	Bravsko, Bosanski Petrovac municipality	44.549°N 16.581806°E	Designed by Mirko Radulović, built in 1972.
Monument to fallen fighters	Monument to fallen fighters	Banja Luka	44.773066°N 17.191883°E	Dedicated to the fallen fighters in the People's Liberation War. Located in the city center on the Square of the Fallen Soldiers.
Monument to victims of fascism	Monument to victims of fascism	Sarajevo	43.855375°N 18.404128°E	A monument commemorating the 55 Sarajevans hanged on Ustaše official Vjekoslav Luburić's orders on the night of 27–28 March 1945.
Monument to Husino miners	Monument to Husino miners	Tuzla		Designed by Ivan Sabolić. Dedicated to Husino miners fallen in the Husino uprising of 1920 and People's Liberation Struggle 1941–1945.
WW2 Monuments	WW2 Monuments	Konjic	43.650214°N 17.964014°E	
Partisans' Cemetery	Partisans' Cemetery	Prijedor		Burial place of National Hero Mladen Stojanović. Approximately 120 Partisan fighters buried here.
Monument to fallen fighters and victims of fascism	Monument to fallen fighters and victims of fascism	Ljubačevo		Dedicated to the mine workers killed by Ustaša on 7 February 1942.
Monument to the fighters of the NOB	Monument to the fighters of the NOB	Ilidža		Memorial ossuary located around the park of Vrelo Bosne. Built in 1961. Designed by Peter Krstić. The monument contains 99 names of fallen NOB fighters from the territory of the Ilidža municipality.
Djevojka sa Une and a monument dedicated to the Bihać operation	Djevojka sa Une and a monument dedicated to the Bihać operation	Bihać		Dedicated to soldiers of the Yugoslav Army fallen during the Bihać operation in 1942.
Kruščica concentration camp	Kruščica concentration camp monument	Vitez		A monument located at the campsite of the former Kruščica concentration camp. Created by Fadil Bilić.
	Vukosavci Memorial Complex	Vukosavci		Built in 1954, a mass grave dedicated to the fighters of Majevica partisan detachment that were killed by Chetniks in 1942. In the central part of the memorial cemetery there is a monument, erected in 1986, a work of Drago Tršar.
Memorial Church of Saint Great Martyr George	Memorial Church of Saint Great Martyr George	Drakulić		A memorial plaque with the names of those killed on February 7, 1942 during the Drakulić massacre around the area of Drakulić.
Monument to the Battle for the Wounded	Monument to the Battle for the Wounded	Gmici	43.842805°N 17.596867°E	Dedicated to the Battle of Neretva. Located in Makljen Mountain. Completed in 1978. Destroyed with explosives after 2000.
Monument to the first partisan airport	Monument to the first partisan airport	Međuvođe		The memorial was placed first in 1951 to honor partisan pilots Rudi Čajavec and Franjo Kluz. Dedicated to the first partisan airfield which on May 21, 1942, in the settlement of Međuvođe, became operational.
Monument to the Partisan Air Squadron	Monument to the Partisan Air Squadron	Medeno Polje		
WW2 Monument	WW2 Monument	Resanovci		Built in 1971. Designed by Miloš Bajić.
	Monument to victims of fascism	Bosanska Kostajnica		The monument honors the partisans who were killed by fascist troops in this village on July 27, 1941.
	Monument to fallen fighters	Kotor Varoš		
Monument to the First Partisan Pilots	Monument to the First Partisan Pilots	Prijedor		Built in 1967, located beside the 'Urije' airstrip.
	Monument to fallen fighters	Donji Baraći		
	Memorial ossuary of the People’s Liberation War	Visoko		Designed by Marijan Kocković, opened in 1963.
Šušnjar Memorial Complex	Šušnjar Memorial Complex	Sanski Most		Dedicated to the May 1941 Sanski Most revolt. Built in 1970. Designed by Petar Krstić.
Partisans' Cemetery	Mass Grave	Ljeskare, Prijedor municipality		Monument erected in the 1980s to mark site of mass grave containing 13 individuals.
	Monument to fallen fighters	Cazin		
	Partisan cemetery in Livno	Livno	43.829444°N 16.998056°E	Designed by Vinko Kragic and Frano Buskareli, built in 1972.
	Memorial complex of the Battle for the Wounded on the Neretva	Jablanica		Located along the Neretva river. Dedicated to the Battle of Neretva. Includes a museum, opened by Josip Broz Tito on 12 November 1978 to mark the 35th anniversary of the battle, and a bridge. The memorial complex was declared a national monument of Bosnia and Herzegovina.

== See also ==
- People's Heroes of Yugoslavia monuments
- List of Yugoslav World War II monuments and memorials
- List of World War II monuments and memorials in Serbia
- List of World War II monuments and memorials in Croatia
- List of World War II monuments and memorials in Montenegro
- List of World War II monuments and memorials in North Macedonia
- List of World War II monuments and memorials in Slovenia
