= Bogdan Bogdanović =

Bogdan Bogdanović may refer to:

- Bogdan Bogdanović (architect) (1922–2010), Serbian architect
- Bogdan Bogdanović (basketball) (born 1992), Serbian basketball player

== See also ==
- Bojan Bogdanović (born 1989), Croatian basketball player
