= List of World War II monuments and memorials in Croatia =

List of Yugoslav World War II monuments and memorials in Croatia represent monuments and memorials built on the territory of the present day Croatia in Yugoslavia between 1945 and 1991. It does not include busts or other statues of individuals (see bottom).

== History ==
The Yugoslav authorities established several memorial sites between 1945 and 1960, though widespread building started after the founding of the Non-Aligned Movement.

Yugoslav president Josip Broz Tito commissioned several memorial sites and monuments in the 1960s and 70s dedicated to World War II battle, and concentration camp sites. They were designed by notable sculptors, including Dušan Džamonja, Vojin Bakić, Miodrag Živković, Jordan and Iskra Grabul, and architects, including Bogdan Bogdanović, Gradimir Medaković. After Tito's death, a small number was built, and the monuments were popular visitor attractions in the 1980s as patriotic sites.

After the dissolution of Yugoslavia and during the Yugoslav Wars in the 1990s, World War II monuments and memorials were targeted and destroyed by vandals while the new Croatian government did nothing to prevent them. It is thought that around 3000 antifascist memorials have been destroyed in Croatia since 1991 while some others were removed. Today, the remaining memorial sites are visited by mostly local antifascist organisations and World War II veterans. In recent times, some demolished monuments were rebuilt.

== List ==
Image	Name	Location	Notes
	Monument to the fallen fighters and civil victims of the fascist terror of Seget Donji and Seget Vranjica	Seget Donji	Designed by Fabjan Bakulić, built in 1954. Star and head of the partisan destroyed by vandals. Head reconstructed 2001 - without star.
	Monument to the fallen fighters and civil victims of the fascist terror of Seget Gonji	Seget Gornji	Designed by Ante Ušljebrka, built in 1960. Destroyed by vandals.
	Monument to the fallen fighters and civil victims of the fascist terror of Trogir	Trogir	Designed by Ivan Mirković, built in 1951. Removed by Trogir authorities 1995.
	Monument to the Revolution of the people of Moslavina	Podgarić	Designed by Dušan Džamonja, built in 1967.^{[2]} Dedicated to the people of Moslavina during World War II.^{[3]}
	Monument to the uprising of the people of Kordun and Banija	Petrova Gora	Designed by Vojin Bakić, built in 1981. Dedicated to the people of Kordun and Banija during World War II.
Spomen park Borik02	Borik Memorial Park	Bjelovar	Designed by Vojin Bakić, built in 1947.
Monument Zagreb	Monument to fallen victim and fighters of fascism in Zagreb 1941-45	Dotrščina, Zagreb	Designed by Branko Ružić.
Spomen-park Dudik, Vukovar	Dudik Memorial Park	Vukovar	Designed by Bogdan Bogdanović, built from 1978 to 1980.
Monument to the Battle of Batina	Batina Battle Memorial Complex	Batina	Designed by Antun Augustinčić, built from 1945 to 1947. Dedicated to fallen soldiers of Yugoslav and Red army during the Battle of Batina.^{[4]}
Partizanski spomenik Orebić06685	Monument to fallen fighters and victims of fascism	Orebić	Located on the Pelješac peninsula, near the village called Gornje Pijavičino. Dedicated to 395 fallen Yugoslav partisans and civilians killed in Italian and ustaša concentration camps. Designed by Ivan Mitrović and Zlatko Jerić, built in 1983.^{[5]}
	Stone Flower	Jasenovac	Dedicated to concentration camp victims at the Jasenovac camp, held by the Ustaše. Designed by Bogdan Bogdanović, built in 1966.^{[6]}
Spomenik Sisackom odredu-Brezovica	Monument to Sisak Detachment	Sisak	Designed by Želimir Janeš. Dedicated to the 1st Sisak Partisan Detachment. Built in 1981 on the site of establishment, in the forest of Brezovica.^{[7]}
Vojin Bakić, Spomenik pobjedi revolucije naroda Slavonije, Kamenska	Monument of the Revolutionary victory of the people of Slavonia	Kamenska	Dedicated to the Partisan victory in Slavonia. Built in 1968 on the Blažuj hill.^{[8]} It was once the biggest abstract sculpture in the world. The Croatian army destroyed the monument in 1992.^{[9]}
	Kamensko Monument	Kamensko	Abstract. Built in Bijeli potoci area of the Lika region.
Jelovice, spomenik	Monument to fallen soldiers of the National Liberation War	Jelovice	
Svirče, spomenik	Monument to fallen fighters of Svirče	Svirče, Hvar	Designed by Dinko Vranković. Built in 1981.
Rovinj006	Monument to fallen fighters and victims of Fascist terror	Rovinj	Designed by Ivan Sabolić. Built in 1956.
Споменик борцима НОБ-а у Трпињи	Monument to fallen fighters	Trpinja	
Spomenik borcima NOB-a	Monument to fallen fighters	Bobota	Built in 1955.
Spomenik borcima-Djurdjevac01	Monument to fallen fighters	Đurđevac	Designed by Slavko Šoša, built in 1952.
		Peroj	
Spomenik ustanku naroda Hrvatske-Srb	Monument to the uprising of the people of Croatia in 1941	Srb	Designed by Vanja Radauš; built in 1951,^{[10]} destroyed in 1995, reconstructed in 2010, reopened in 2011. Dedicated to the antifascist uprising of the local people at 27 July 1941, which quickly spread to whole of Lika and Bosanska Krajina.
Dotrscina spomenik 1a	Memorial to victims of fascism killed in Dotrščina	Dotrščina, Zagreb	Designed by Vojin Bakić; built in 1968.^{[11]} Dedicated to cca. 10,000 victims of fascism killed by Ustaša in the Dotrščina forest from 1941 to 1945.
Spomenik palim borcima Bolmanske bitke-Bolman	Monument to the Battle of Bolman	Bolman	Designed by Nikola Kečanin; built in 1951. Dedicated to fallen fighters of Yugoslav and Red army in the battle of Bolman in 1944.
Spomenik Streljanje talaca, Strosmajerov trg	Shooting of hostages	Zagreb	Designed by Frano Kršinić; built in 1951.^{[12]} Dedicated to victims of fascism killed by the Ustaša in Dotrščina, Maksimir and Rakov Potok near Zagreb 1941–1945.
Fluminensia-podhum-grobnik-zrtve-spomenik-sime-vulas1	Monument to victims of fascism from Podhum	Platak	Designed by Šime Vulas; built in 1970.^{[13]} Dedicated to residents of Podhum village, who were all killed by Italian fascists in 1942.
Pula memorejo pri la kontraŭfaŝisma batalo de 1941-1944	Monument to fallen fighters and victims of fascism	Pula	Designed by Vanja Radauš; built in 1950.
Spomenik oslobodjenja Rijeka 040408	Memorial to the liberation of Rijeka	Rijeka	Designed by Vinko Matković; built in 1955.
Grobnica narodnih heroja Zagreb	Tomb of the People's Heroes	Zagreb	Designed by Đuro Kaurić; built in 1968.
Monument to the residents of Zagreb fallen in People's liberation struggle 1941-45	Monument to the residents of Zagreb fallen in People's liberation struggle 1941-45	Dotrščina, Zagreb	Designed by Stevan Luketić; built in 1981.
Monument to the residents of Ciglenica neighbourhood fallen in People's liberation struggle 1941-45	Monument to fallen fighters of the Zagreb's Ciglenica neighbourhood	Zagreb	Designed by Tomislav Ostoja, built in 1972.^{[14]}
Viskovo spomenik 2 svj rat 160309	Monument to fallen fighters	Viškovo	
Spomenik slobodi Donji Miholjac	Monument to freedom	Donji Miholjac	Designed by Stjepan Brlošić, built in 1968. Dedicated to fallen fighters and victims of fascism from Donji Miholjac and neighbouring places.
Spomenik Borcima Z Car 0907	Monument to fallen fighters	Crikvenica	Designed by Zvonko Car, built in 1949.
Dramalj spomenik 110208	Monument to fallen fighters	Dramalj	Designed by Zvonko Car.
Spomenik prosinackim zrtvama	Monument to the December victims of 1943	Zagreb	Designed by Dušan Džamonja, built in 1961.^{[15]} Dedicated to the 16 antifascists that were hung by the Ustaša in Dubrava on 20 December 1943.
Spomenik palim borcima iz Slavonskog Broda u NOB	Monument to fallen fighters	Slavonski Brod	
Grobnica djece sa Kozare Mirogoj	Monument to the children from the Kozara mountain	Zagreb	Designed by Stevan Luketić. Dedicated to more than 400 children, mostly Serbs, that were taken from the Kozara mountain by Ustaša in 1942, and after that confined in many concentration camps (Jasenovac, Lepoglava, Jastrebarsko, etc.) where most of them died.^{[16]}
Monument to World War Two Dead - Solta Island - Croatia - 02	Monument to fallen fighters	Šolta	
Kraljevica, partizanski spomenik	Monument to fallen fighters	Kraljevica	
Spomen palim NOB Drivenik	Monument to fallen fighters	Drivenik	
Lipa, spomenik zrtvama fasizma 1	Monument to victims of fascism	Lipa	Dedicated to 269 people killed by Italian fascists and German Nazis on 30.04.1944.
Partizanski spomenik, Lovište00954	Monument to fallen fighters	Lovište	
Partizanski spomenik žrtvama, Kuna Peliška03076	Monument to fallen fighters and victims of fascism	Kuna Peliška	
	Monument to victims of fascism	Pijavičino	
	Monument to fallen fighters	Viganj	
	Monument to fallen fighters and victims of fascism	Ploče	
	Monument to fallen fighters	Ston	
Podgora Kroatien 3	Monument “Seagull's wings”	Podgora	Designed by Rajko Radović, built in 1962.^{[17]} Dedicated to the foundation of the Yugoslav partisan navy in 1942.
	Monument to fallen fighters and victims of fascism	Vodice	
	Monument to fallen fighters and victims of fascism in Zagreb 1941-45	Zagreb	Designed by Branko Ružić.
	Monument to fallen fighters and victims of fascism from Slabinja	Slabinja	Built in 1981.
	Monument to fallen fighters	Novi Vinodolski	
Rijeka NOB railway workers' monument	Monument to railway workers fallen in People's liberation struggle	Rijeka	
	Monument “Three seamen”	Senj	Dedicated to fallen partisan fighters 1941–45.
Spomenik ustanku-Brezovica	Monument to the uprising	Near Sisak	Designed by Frano Kršinić, built in 1954. Slightly damaged.
Spomenik Pleso Velika Gorica	Monument to the liberation of Zagreb	Pleso	Designed by Marijan Burger, built in 1978. Dedicated to the breaking of Ustaša and German defense circle around Zagreb by Yugoslav army units in 1945.^{[18]}
Viroviti ko gorblje5	Monument to fallen fighters	Virovitica	Designed by Dušan Džamonja.
Monument to fallen fighters	Monument to fallen fighters	Bobota	
	Monument to fallen fighters	Županje Selo	
	Monument to fallen fighters	Povile	Built in 1981.
	Monument to fallen fighters	Orebić	
	Monument to fallen fighters	Kaniža	
	Monument to fallen fighters	Zagreb	Dedicated to fallen fighters of Jarun and Staglišće.
Spomenik palim borcima i zrtvama fasizma-Slatina	Monument to fallen fighters and victims of fascism	Slatina	Dedicated to 2500 fallen partisan fighters and 6500 victims of fascism from Slatina and neighbouring places.
	Monument to fallen fighters	Bolman	Dedicated to fallen fighters in the battle of Bolman.
	“The Carrying of the Wounded”	Zagreb	Designed by Antun Augustinčić, built in 1953. Dedicated to the students of Faculty of Veterinary Medicine in Zagreb who have fallen in struggle against fascism.^{[19]}
Dreznica-hrvaska-1	Monument to the Uprising	Drežnica	Designed by Kosta Angeli Radovani, built in 1949.^{[20]} Dedicated to fallen fighters and victims of fascism from Drežnica.
	Šubićevac Memorial Park	Šibenik	Designed by Kosta Angeli Radovani and Zdenko Kolacio, built in 1961.^{[21]} Dedicated to 43 victims who were executed by Italian fascists from 1941 to 1943.
	Monument to fallen fighters	Samobor	Designed by Nikola Njirić.
	Monument to fallen fighters	Kumrovec	
	Monument to victims of fascism	Krapinske Toplice	Designed by Antun Augustinčić, built in 1973. Until the 1990s, at the memorial plaque on the monument was writing In the honor of the victims of fascism. After that, it was added ...and of the Homeland war. Partisan star was also replaced by the Coat of arms of Croatia.
	Monument to fallen fighters	Zagreb	Designed by Vanja Radauš.
	Monument to fallen fighters	Zagreb	Built in 1961.
Monument to fallen fighters	Monument to fallen fighters	Gaboš	
Memorial water well to Kosta Rakin	Memorial water well to Kosta Rakin, Jasenovac concentration camp victim	Markušica	Built in 1970.
Monument to fallen fighters	Monument to fallen fighters	Markušica	
Monument to fallen fighters	Monument to fallen fighters	Ostrovo	
Partisan Cemetery in Komletinci	Partisan cemetery	Komletinci	Designed by Zdenko Kolacio and Dušan Džamonja, built in 1976.
	Kampor Memorial Park	Rab	Designed by Edvard Ravnikar and Vladimir Lakovič, built in intervals between 1953 and 1988.
	Tičan Memorial Area	Tičan	Built in 1965.
	26 Frozen Partisan Fighters Memorial	Matić poljana	Designed by Zdenko Sila.
	Red Army Memorial	Beli Manastir	
	Monument to fallen fighters and victims of fascism	Plovanija	Designed by Aleksandar Rukavina, built in 1981.
Monument to fallen fighters and victims of fascism	Monument to fallen fighters and victims of fascism	Tordinci	
Monument to fallen fighters and victims of fascism	Monument to fallen fighters and victims of fascism	Vinkovački Banovci	
Monument to fallen fighters and victims of fascism	Monument to fallen fighters and victims of fascism	Vinkovački Banovci	
Monument to fallen fighters	Monument to fallen fighters	Vinkovački Banovci	
Monument to fallen fighters	Monument to fallen fighters	Vinkovački Banovci	
Monument to fallen fighters and victims of Fascism	Monument to fallen fighters and victims of Fascism	Pačetin	
Monument to fallen revolutionary fighters and victims of Fascism	Monument to fallen revolutionary fighters and victims of Fascism	Borovo	1967
Monument to fallen revolutionary fighters and victims of Fascism	Monument to heroes, fighters, fathers, brothers, sisters and our children of Borovo, by women of Borovo	Borovo	9.6.1946
Plaque to the Partisans and victims of Fascist Terror	Plaque to the Partisans and victims of Fascist Terror	Mirkovci	
Monument to fallen revolutionary fighters and victims of Fascism	Monument to fallen fighters and victims of Fascism	Bijelo Brdo	
Monument to fallen revolutionary fighters and victims of Fascism	Monument to fallen fighters and victims of Fascism	Bršadin	
World War II monument in Borovo Naselje	World War II monument in Borovo Naselje	Borovo Naselje	
World War II monument in Borovo Naselje	World War II monument in Branjin Vrh	Branjin Vrh	
Monument to the liberators of Tovarnik	Monument to the liberators of Tovarnik	Tovarnik	
World War II memorial in Dalj	World War II memorial in Dalj	Dalj	
World War II memorial in Dalj	World War II memorial in Šljivoševci	Šljivoševci	
World War II memorial in Bračevci	World War II victims memorial in Bračevci	Bračevci	
World War II memorial in Stara Gradiška	Memorial to victims of fascism	Stara Gradiška	

== See also ==
- People's Heroes of Yugoslavia monuments
- List of World War II monuments and memorials in Bosnia and Herzegovina
- List of World War II monuments and memorials in Montenegro
- List of World War II monuments and memorials in North Macedonia
- List of World War II monuments and memorials in Serbia
- List of World War II monuments and memorials in Slovenia
- List of Yugoslav World War II monuments and memorials
