= Mound of the Unbeaten =

Memorial complex in Prilep, Macedonia

- Могила на непобедените (Macedonian)
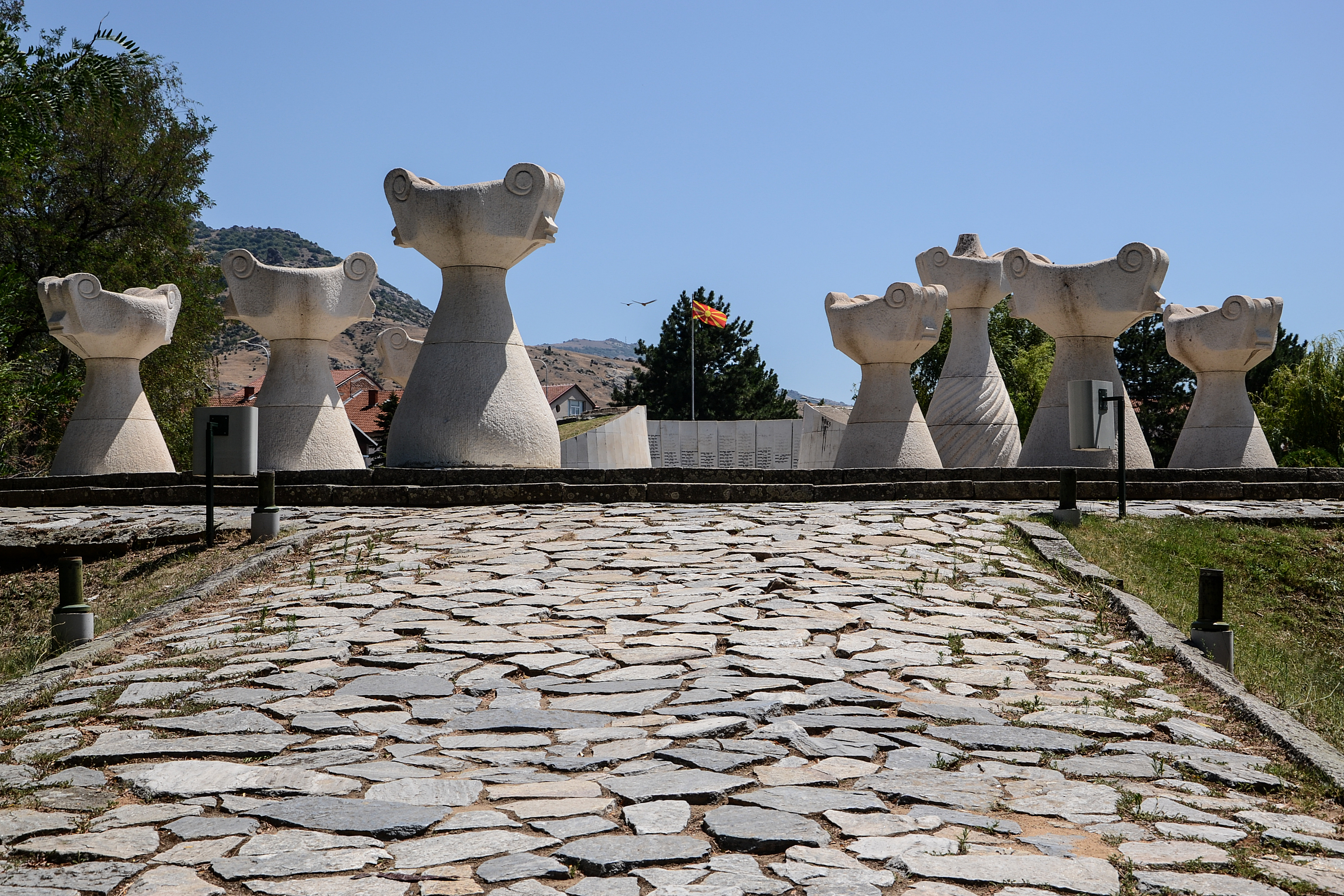
- Artist: Bogdan Bogdanović
- Year: 1961
- Type: Sculpture
- Location: Prilep; 41°20′04″N 21°33′16″E

Mound of the Unbeaten (Macedonian: Могила на непобедените) is a World War II Yugoslav memorial in the Park of the Revolution, Prilep, North Macedonia. The monument and memorial complex were built by the Yugoslav Communist authorities in 1961 in honor to the fallen fighters of the so-called People's Liberation Struggle in Macedonia. Author of the memorial complex is Yugoslav architect Bogdan Bogdanović.

The complex consists of memorial urns and the common graves of fallen Communist Macedonian Partisans. The urns are constructed from marble, and reminiscent of the antique urns. Biggest urn in complex has the symbol of the eternal flame at the top, which is symbol of Macedonian people's struggle for freedom. In the second part of the complex is the crypt which houses the remains of 462 fallen partisan fighters from Prilep and the neighboring places . Their names are inscribed on the marble slabs.

The memorial complex was revitalized from 2007 until 2008.

== Description ==
Park of the Revolution is located in the southern part of the city, landscaping is decorated with high pine trees and low growing evergreen flora. The park is enriched with monuments 1961 in honor of all the fallen soldiers and participants of People's Liberation Movement. The mound makes a semicircular shape in which the inner part of the entire vertical surface paved with white marble slabs. On them are inscribed the names of 462 killed partisans from Prilep and the surrounding places. In front of a semicircular form rises eight marble memorial urns, symbolizing the formation of the first partisan detachment in Macedonia and their transformation into a powerful military units.

Park of the Revolution was declared a cultural heritage monument in 1989. Inside the park, there is an Alley of the People's Heroes, officially opened in 1961. There are nine bronze busts of fallen People's heroes born in Prilep: Kiro Gavriloski, Ilija Jovanovski, Jordan Čopela, Borko Taleski, Kuzman Josifovski Pitu, Mirče Acev, Borko Velevski, Rampo Levkov and Krume Volnaroski. From 2012. a project was adopted that in addition to these nine, should be built four more busts to People's heroes from Prilep, who acted as politicians in socialist Macedonia: Vera Aceva, Đore Damevski, Borko Temelkovski and Krste Crvenkovski.

== Gallery ==
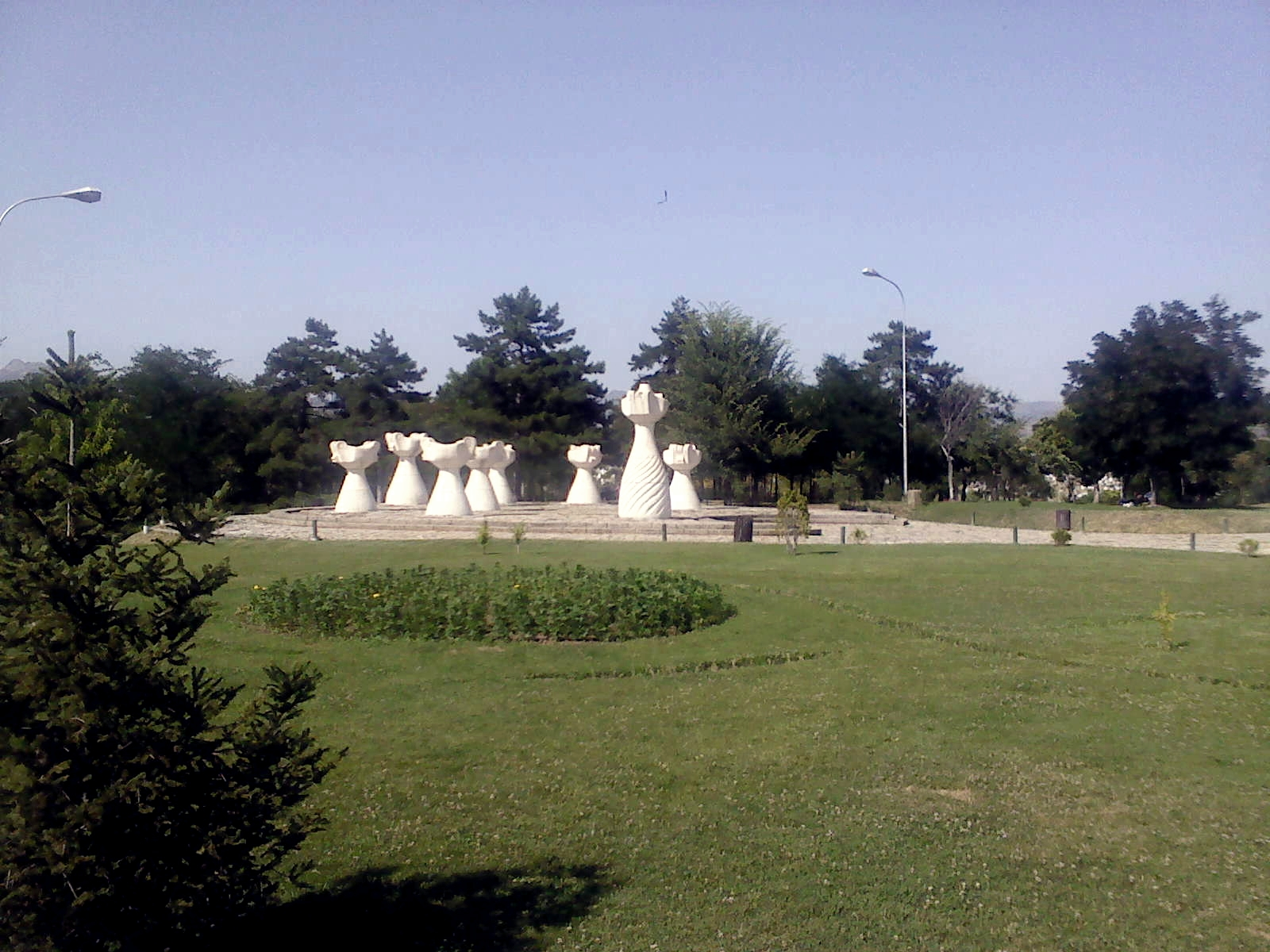
Park of the Revolution and the Mound

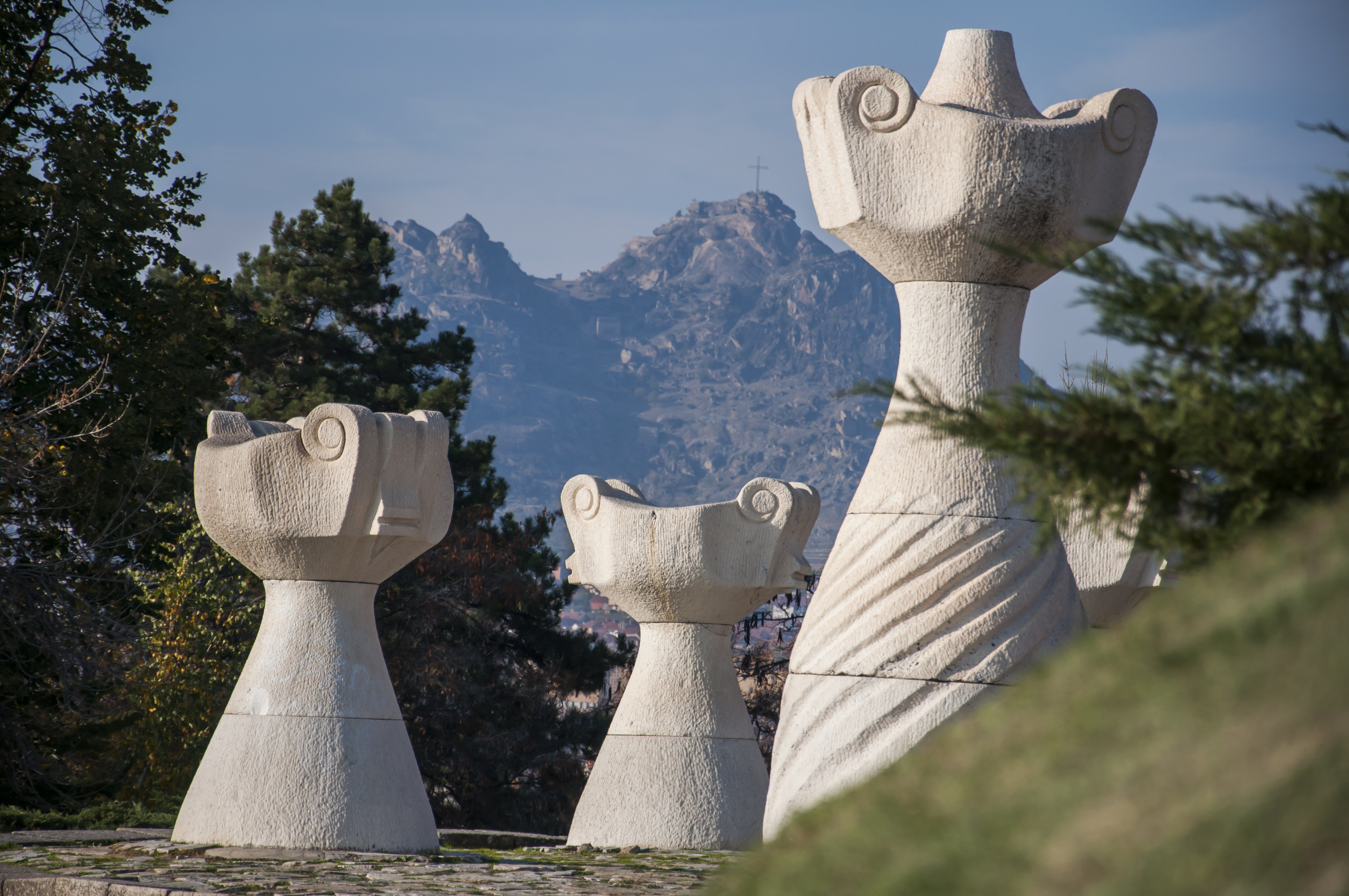
View at the urns

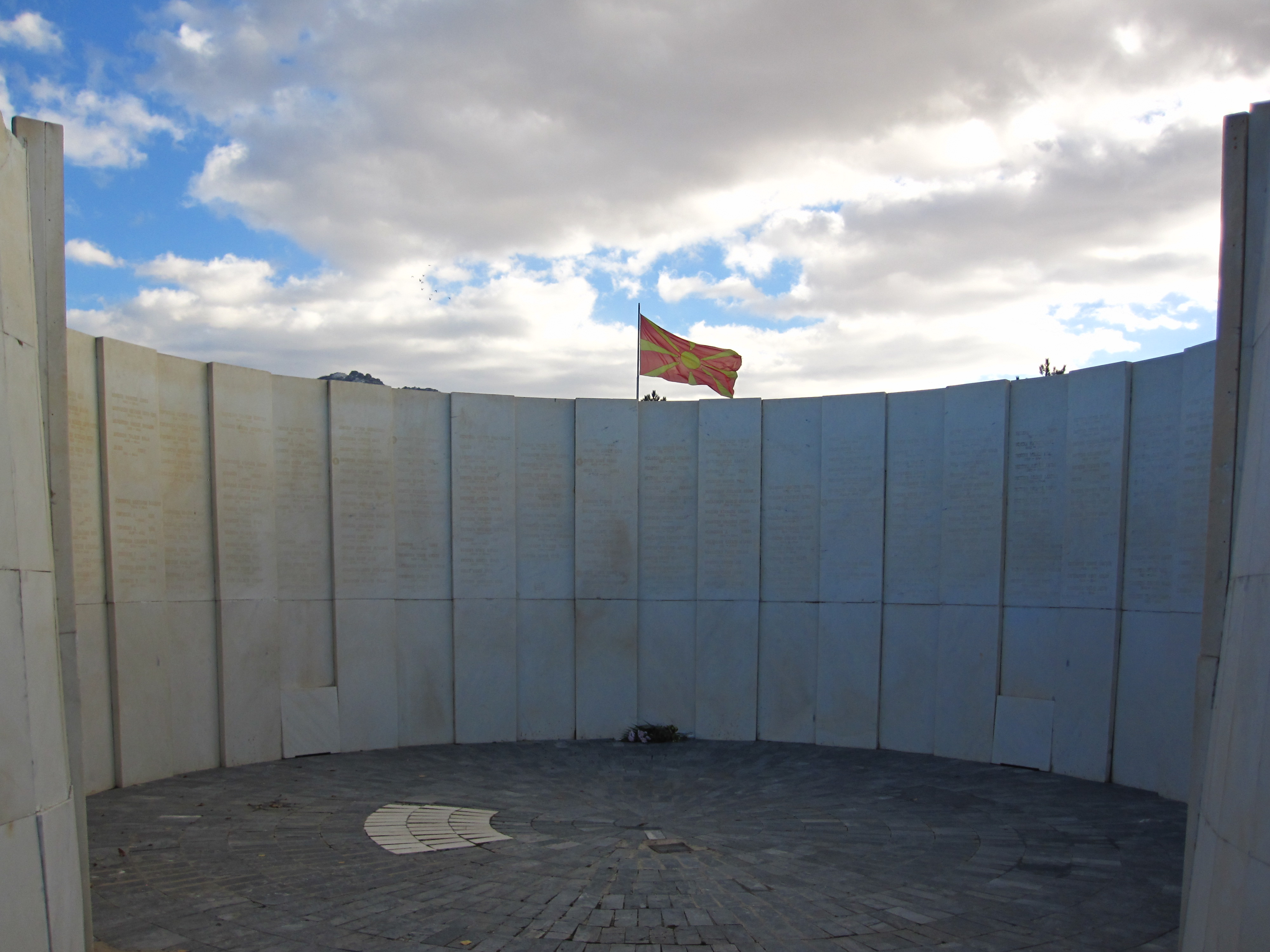
Common graves of fallen soldiers

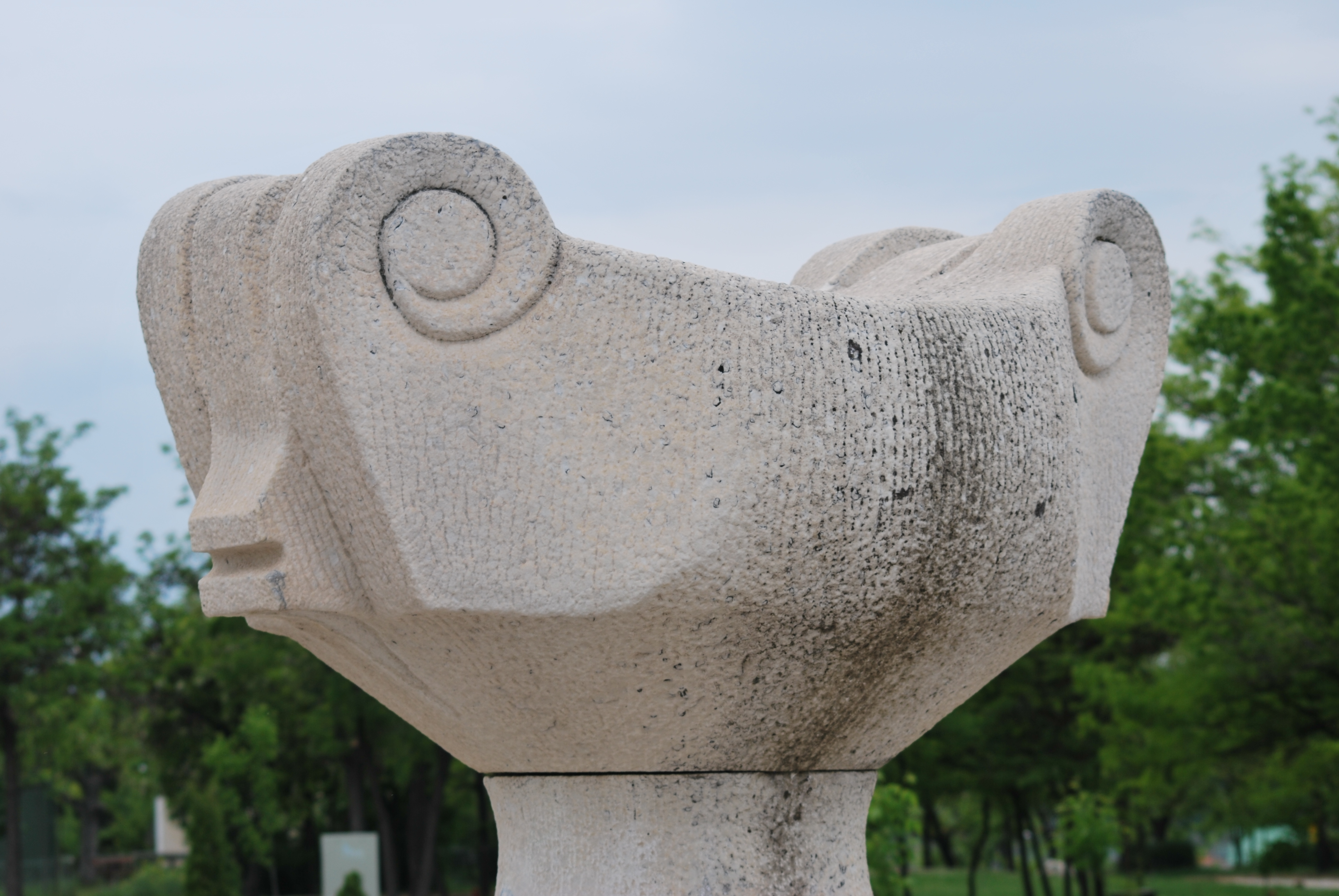
Detail from one of the urns

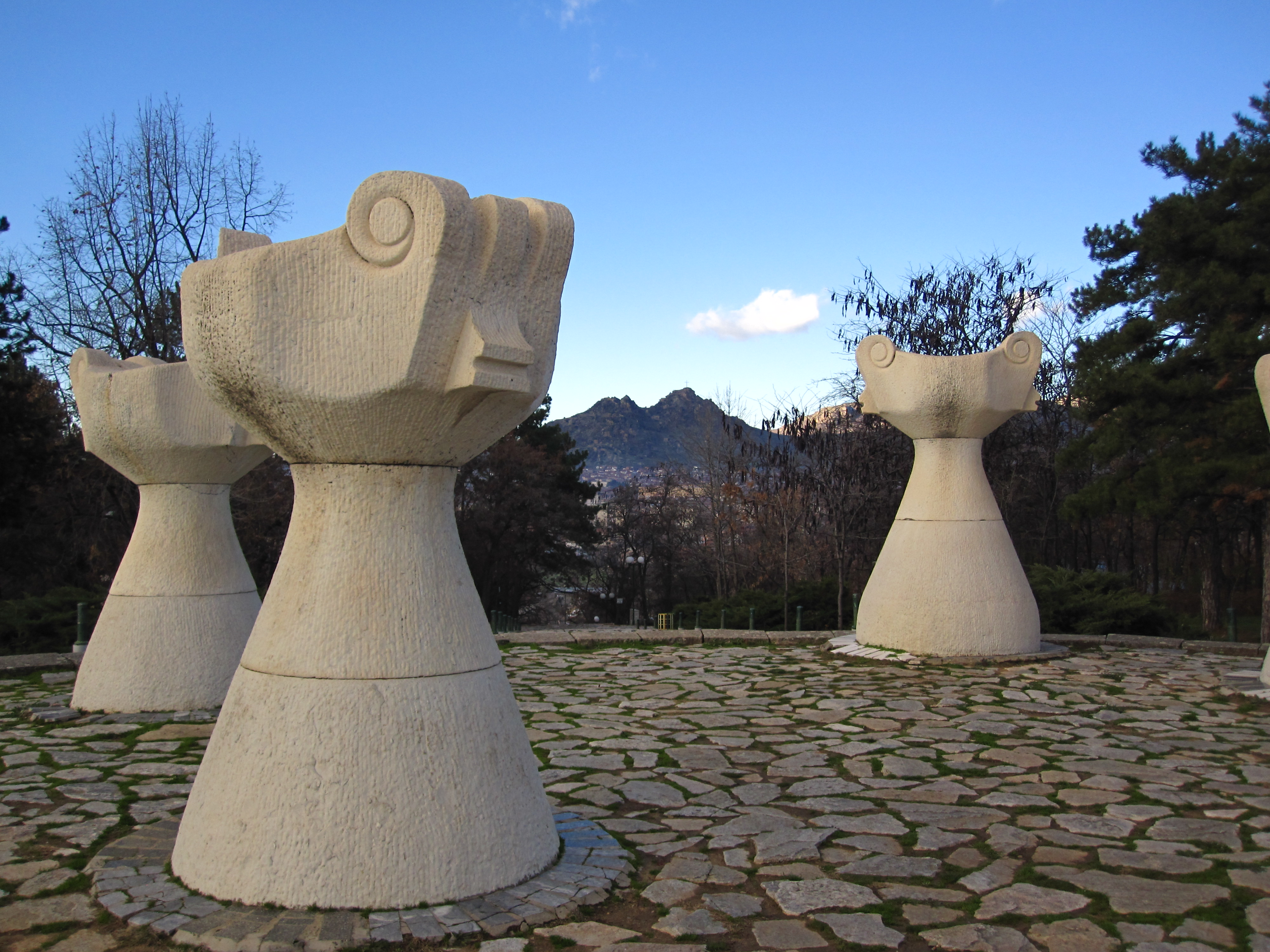
Three urns
