= Mali Popović =

Coordinates: 44.0525°N 21.2942°E

- Village
- Interactive map of Mali Popović
- Country: Serbia
- District: Pomoravlje District
- Municipality: Jagodina

Population (2002)
  - Total: 445
- Time zone: UTC+1 (CET)
  - Summer (DST): UTC+2 (CEST)

Mali Popović is a village in the municipality of Jagodina, Serbia. According to the 2002 census, the village has a population of 445 people.
