= Necropolis for the victims of Fascism =

War memorial in Novi Travnik, Bosnia and Herzegovina

Necropolis for the victims of Fascism, Novi Travnik
- Bosnia and Herzegovina
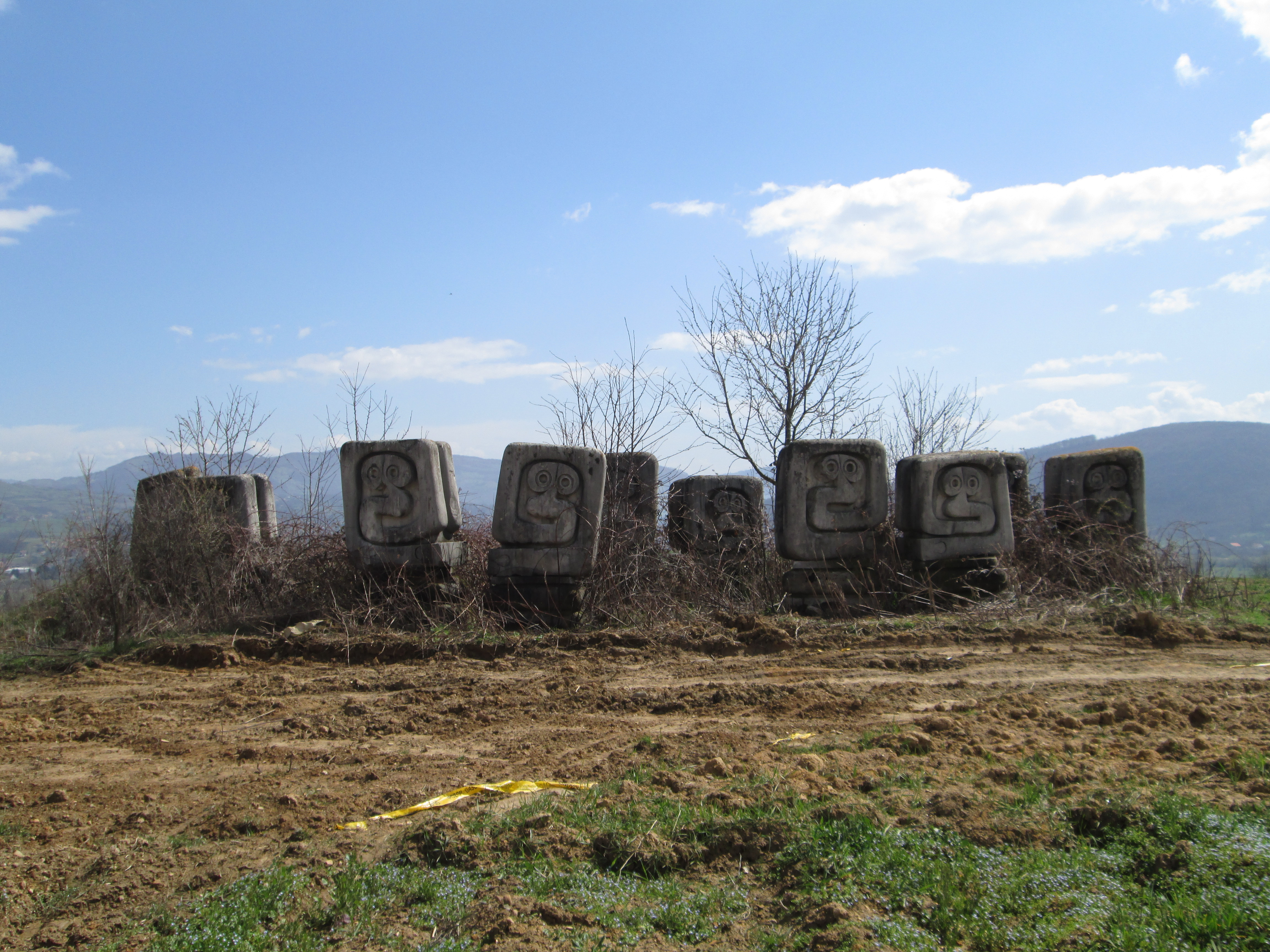
- For civilians of Central Bosnia
- Unveiled: 1975
- Location: 44°11′46.99″N 17°41′27.75″E; Novi Travnik, Bosnia and Herzegovina
- Designed by: Bogdan Bogdanović
- Commemorated: c.700

KONS of Bosnia and Herzegovina
- Official name: Necropolis of the victims of fascism, the cultural landscape
- Type: Category I monument
- Criteria: II. Value; A, B i.ii.iii.iv.v.vi., C i.ii., D i.ii.iii.iv.
- Designated: March 26, 2012 (session No. )
- Reference no.: 3383
- Decision no.: 04.2-2.3-73/12-2
- Listed: List of National Monuments of Bosnia and Herzegovina
- Operator: -

The Necropolis for the victims of Fascism (Bosnian/Croatian/Serbian: Nekropola žrtvama fašizma), also known as Spomen obilježje na Smrekama, is war memorial located in Novi Travnik, Bosnia and Herzegovina. It was opened in 1975 to commemorate around 700 victims executed at this site during the Second World War, and designed by the architect Bogdan Bogdanović. The monument is located in farmland on a hilltop named Čamića Brdo, just off the main road between Vitez and Travnik. The site was inscribed as a National Monument of Bosnia and Herzegovina in 2012 in the Cultural Landscape category.

== Description ==
The monument consists of twelve megalithic compositions chiseled from Bihacite stone within a complex of paths and steps. The megaliths have been described variously as "stone dragon sentinels", "paired snakes", "heads of soldiers", and “large stones engraved with strange primitive symbols that recall those of the Bogomils”. They are placed on stone plinths, and set in two irregular arcs, in pairs, with the distance between each pair measuring approximately 2–3 metres.

Inscription

На Смрицама између
Буковице и Виленице
≠≠≠≠ злочинци
године 1941
звјерски су
побили око 700
недужних и беспомоћних
грађана с подручја
средње Босне

On Smrike between
Bukovica and Vilenica
≠≠≠≠ criminals
In the year 1941
Horrifically
Killed around 700
Innocent and defenceless
Citizens from the region
Of Central Bosnia

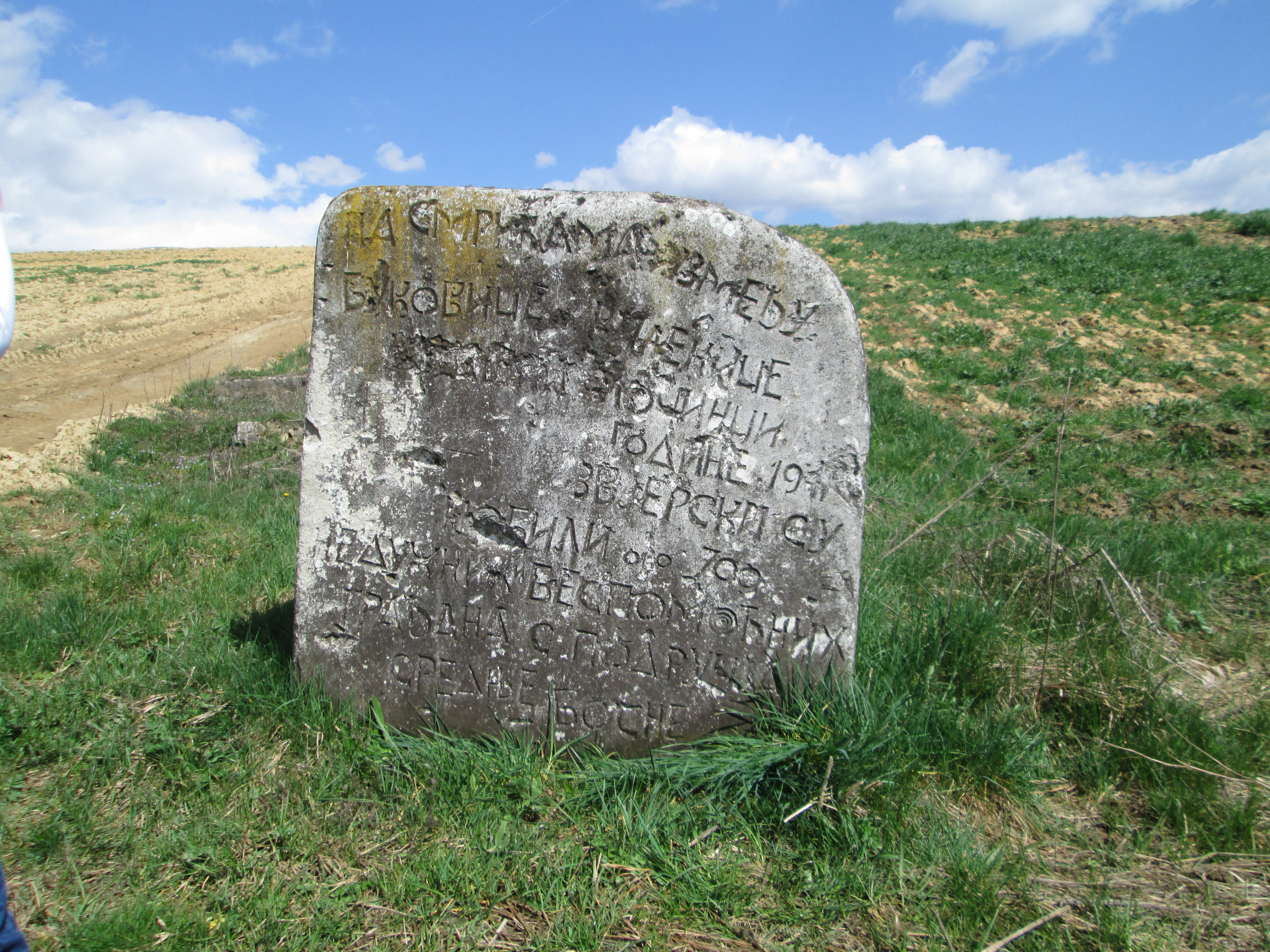
Entrance sign to the Necropolis to the victims of Fascism, Novi Travnik, Bosnia & Herzegovina (1975)

== History ==
Although the memorial site originally occupied a 2 square kilometer patch of land, encroaching farmland has now reduced the area to less than 200 square metres, and a small flight of steps approximately 40 metres long. These steps and the flagstone area at their base are no longer maintained.

The area around Novi Travnik saw some of the heaviest fighting of the 1992-95 war. As well as the presence of landmines in the vicinity until recently, leading to a general neglect of the area, one megalith is badly damaged, being overturned and broken. A further sculpture appears to be almost completely absent. Several of the megaliths bear bullet impacts, particularly on the eastern-facing side. One word has been intentionally erased from the commemorative stone at the site's entrance. This word almost definitely referred to Ustaše forces. No comprehensive conservation or restoration works have been carried out at the site since its 1975 opening, although the stones were cleaned and vegetation which had overgrown the monument was removed in 2023. A ceremonial wreath laying is undertaken at the monument every 9 May.

== See also ==
- Vraca Memorial Park is located in Sarajevo, Bosnia and Herzegovina.
- Partisan cemetery in Livno is located in Livno, Bosnia and Herzegovina.
- Partisan Memorial Cemetery in Mostar is located in Mostar, Bosnia and Herzegovina (also designed by Bogdan Bogdanović).
