= Ljubačevo =

Ljubačevo Љубачево (Serbian)
- Village (Selo)
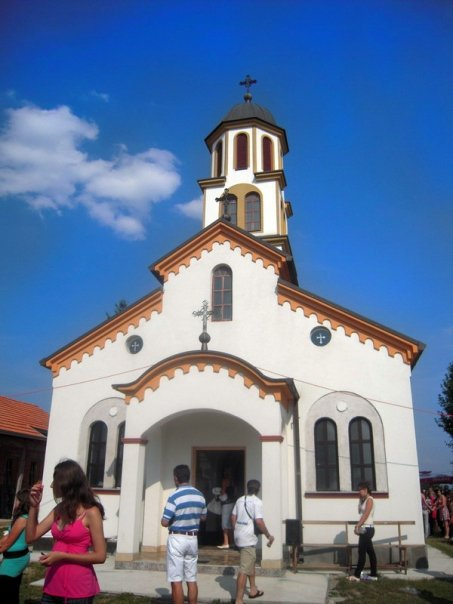

- Location within Bosnia and Herzegovina
- Coordinates: 44°39′43″N 17°12′02″E
- Country: Bosnia and Herzegovina
- Entity: Republika Srpska
- Municipality: Banja Luka

Population (2013)
  - Total: 500
- Time zone: UTC+1 (CET)
  - Summer (DST): UTC+2 (CEST)

Ljubačevo (Serbian Cyrillic: Љубачево) is a village in the municipality of Banja Luka, Republika Srpska, Bosnia and Herzegovina.
