= Rakovac, Beočin =

Rakovac Раковац (Serbian)
- Village (Selo)
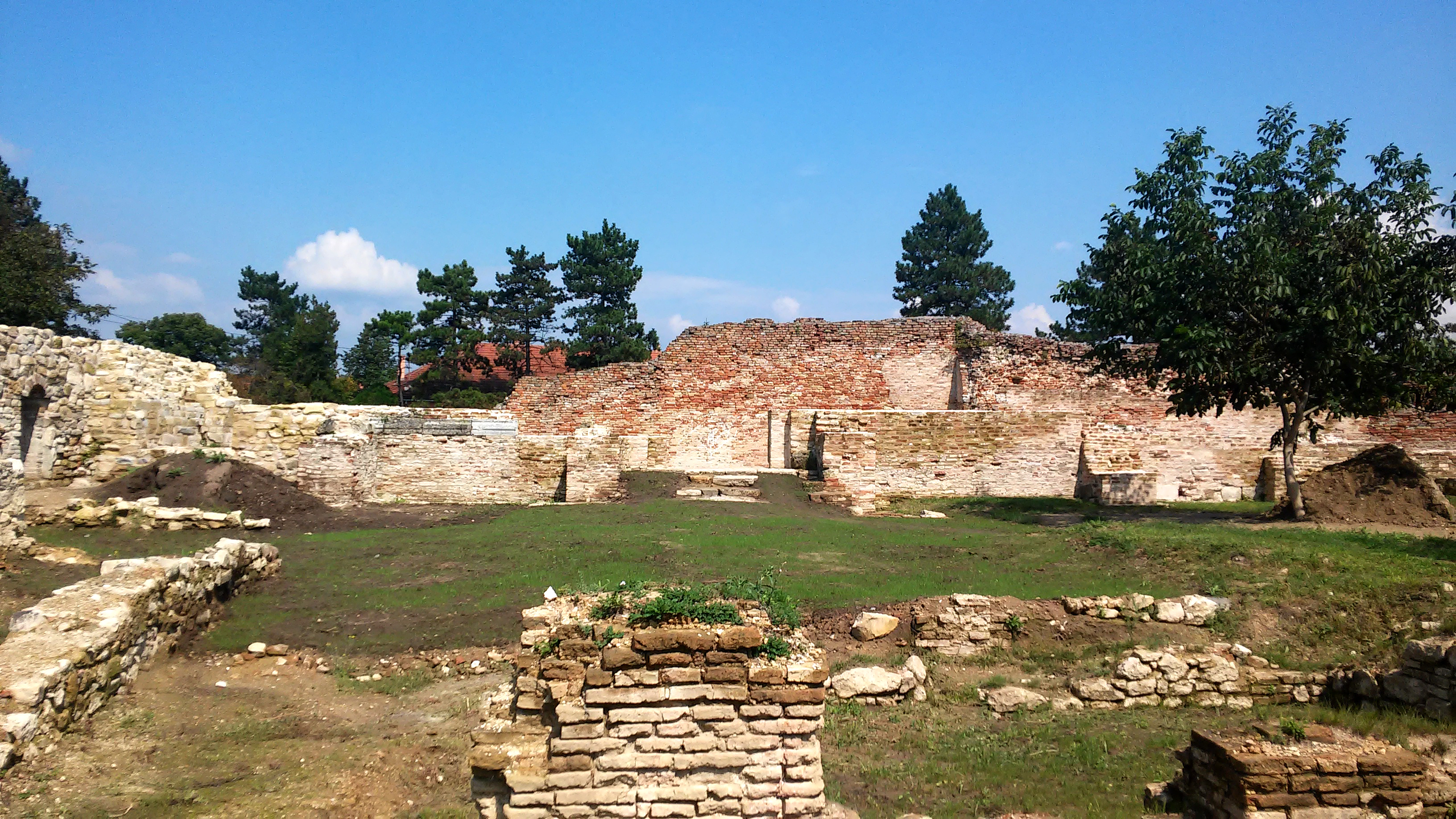
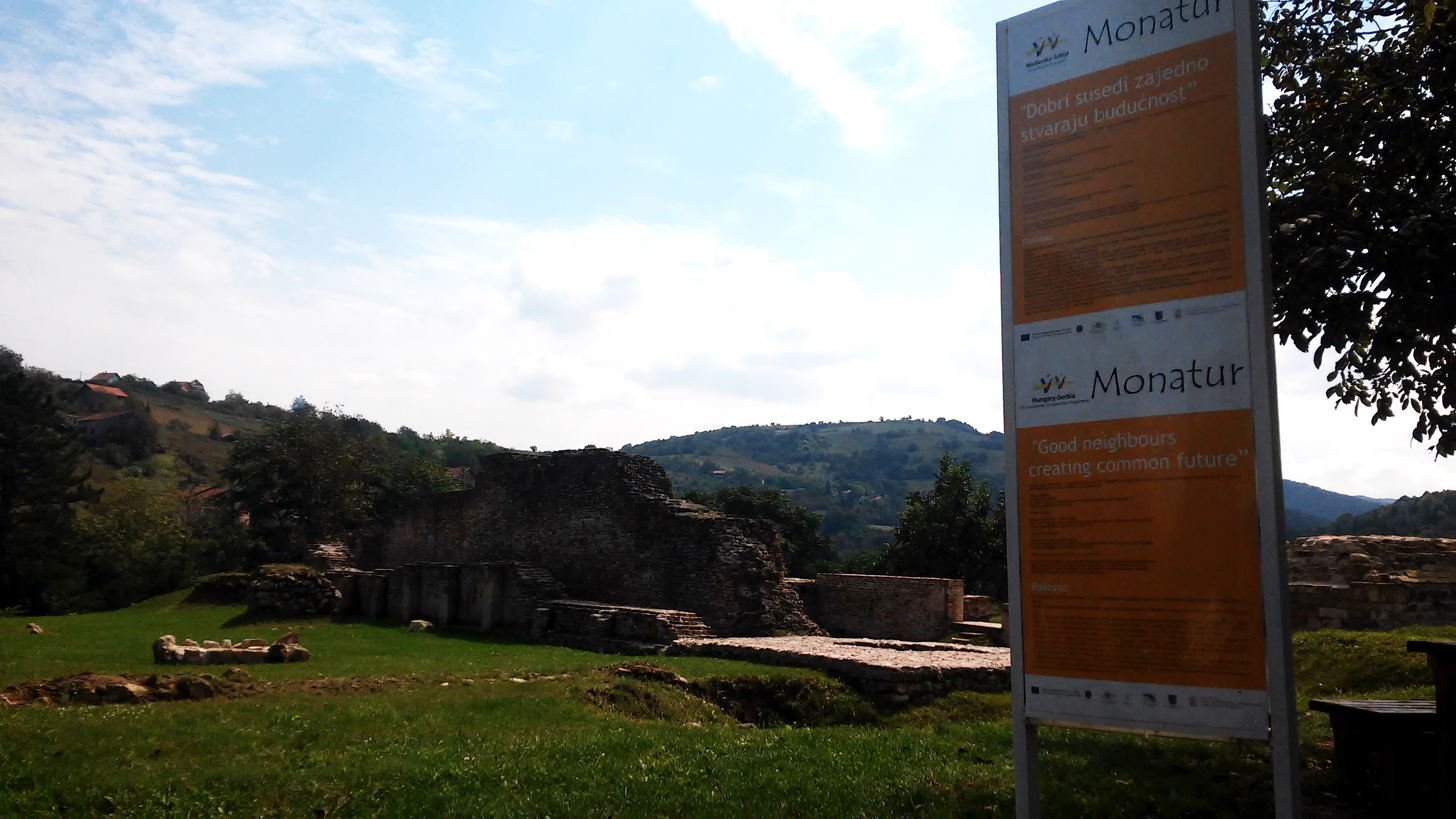
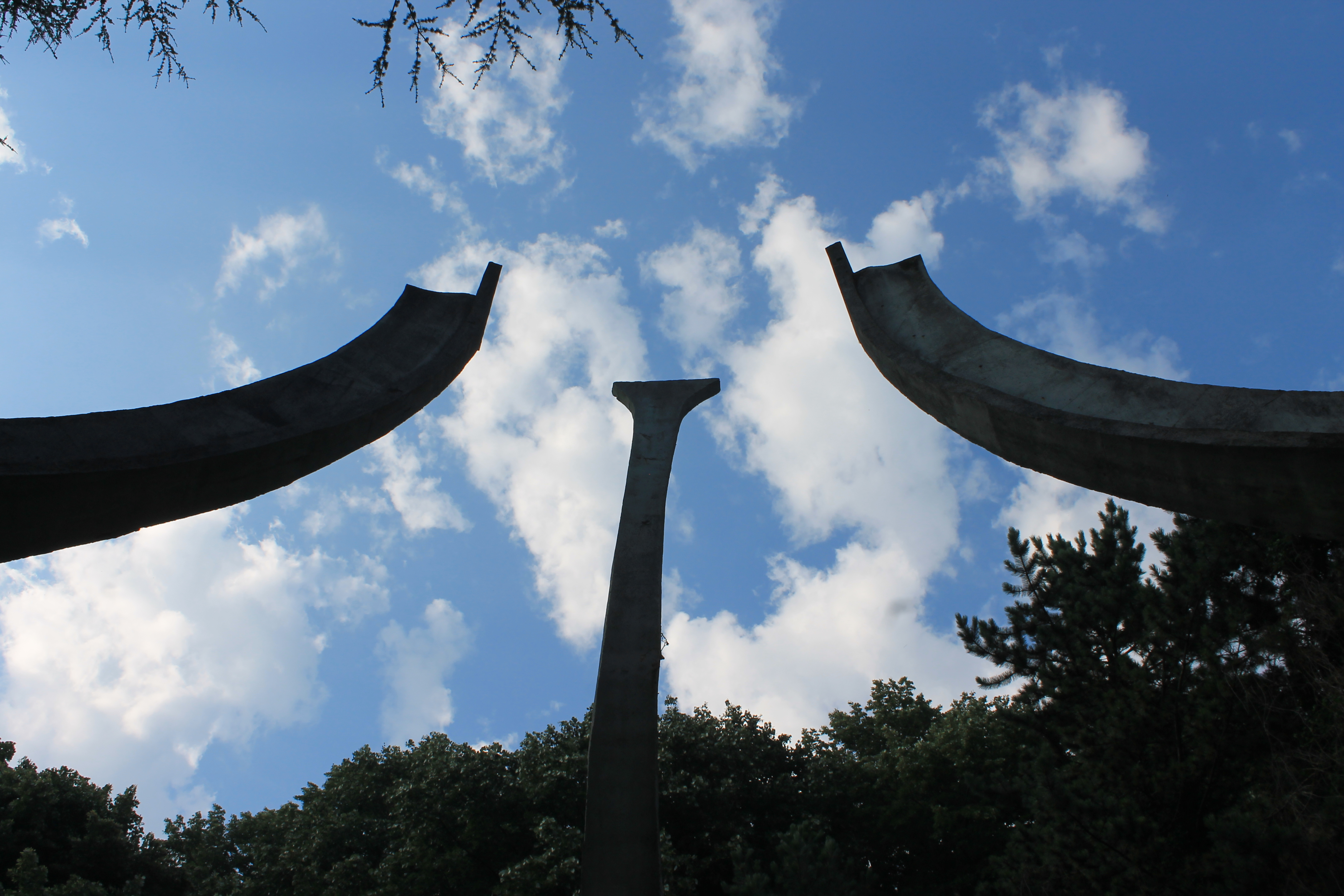
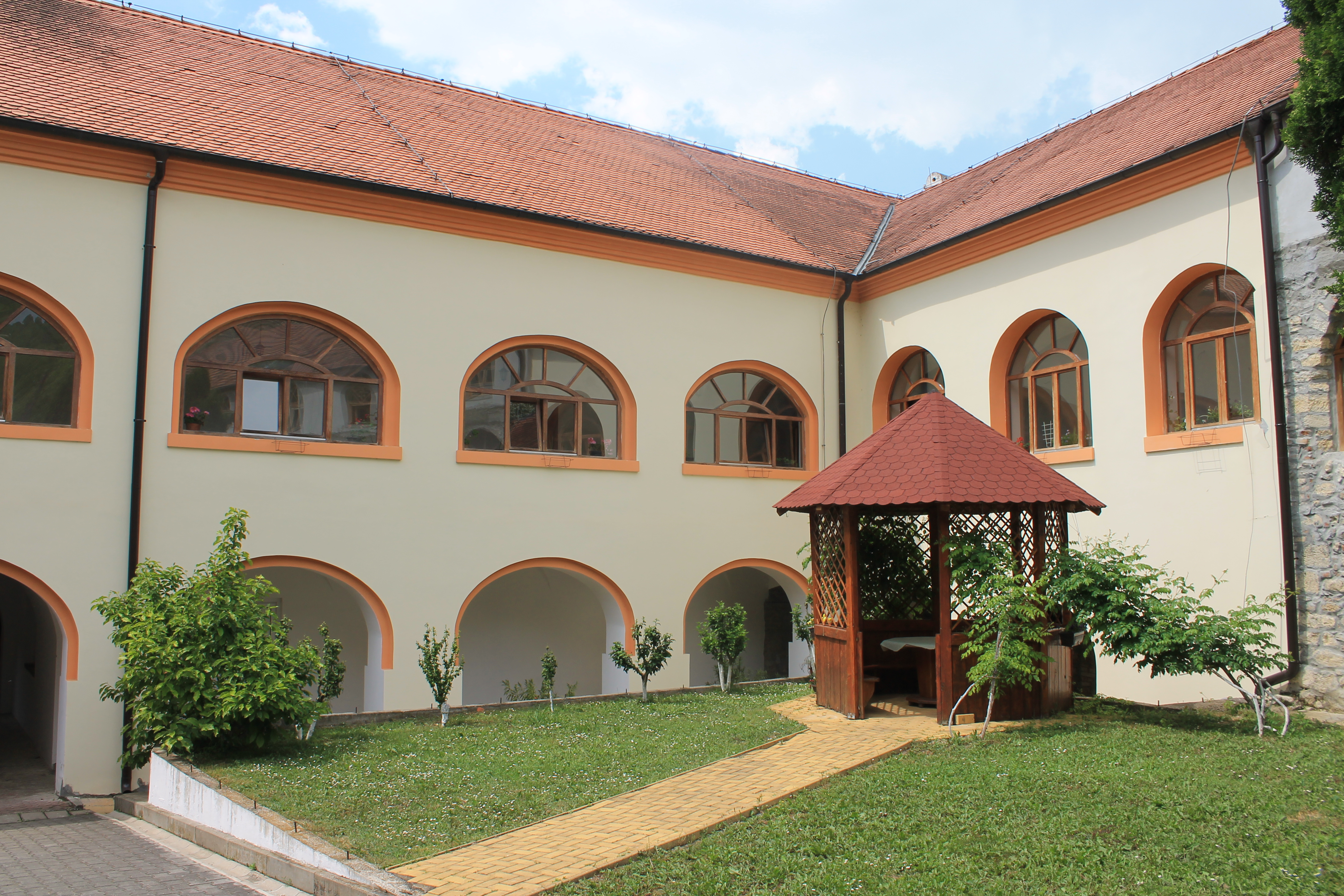
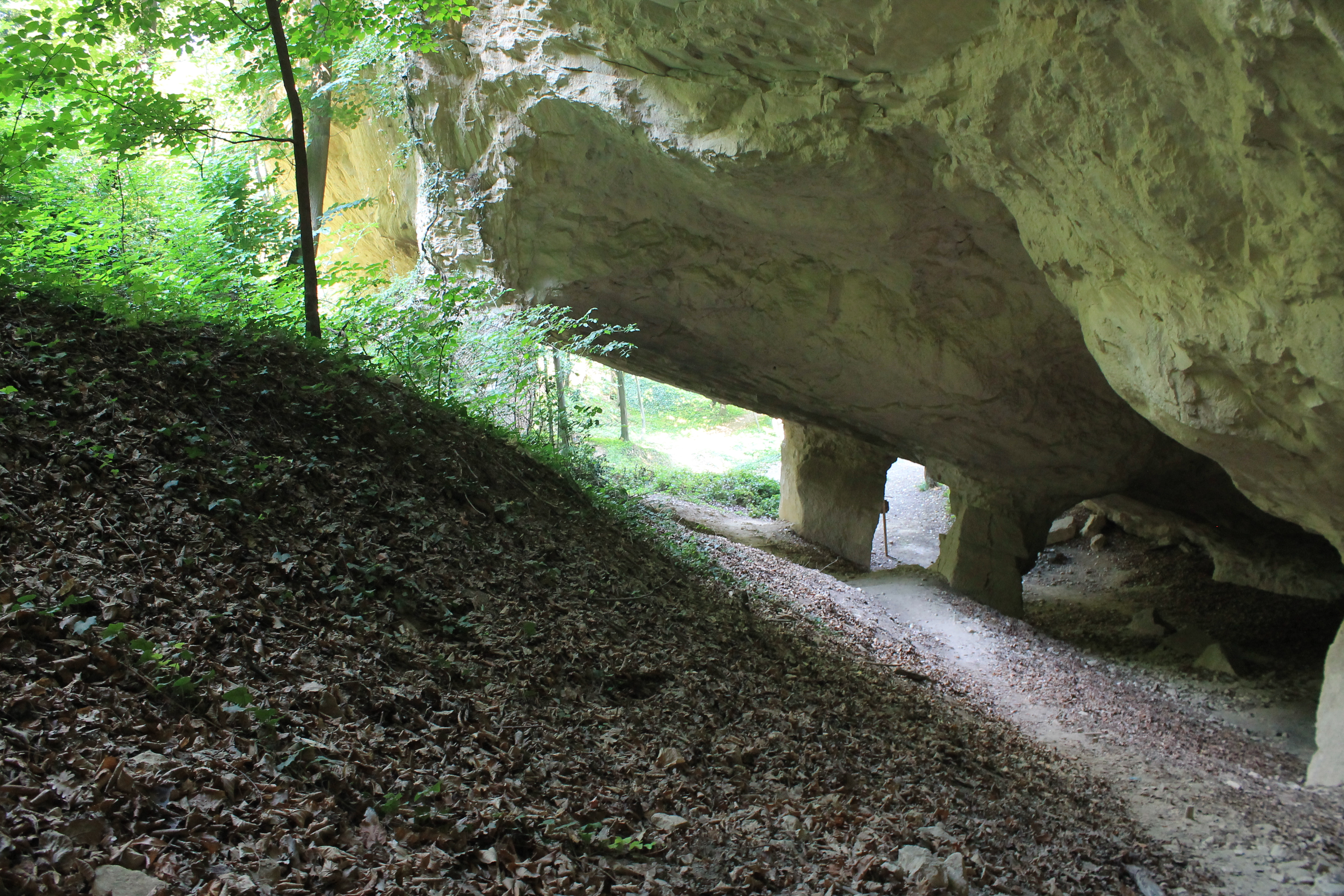
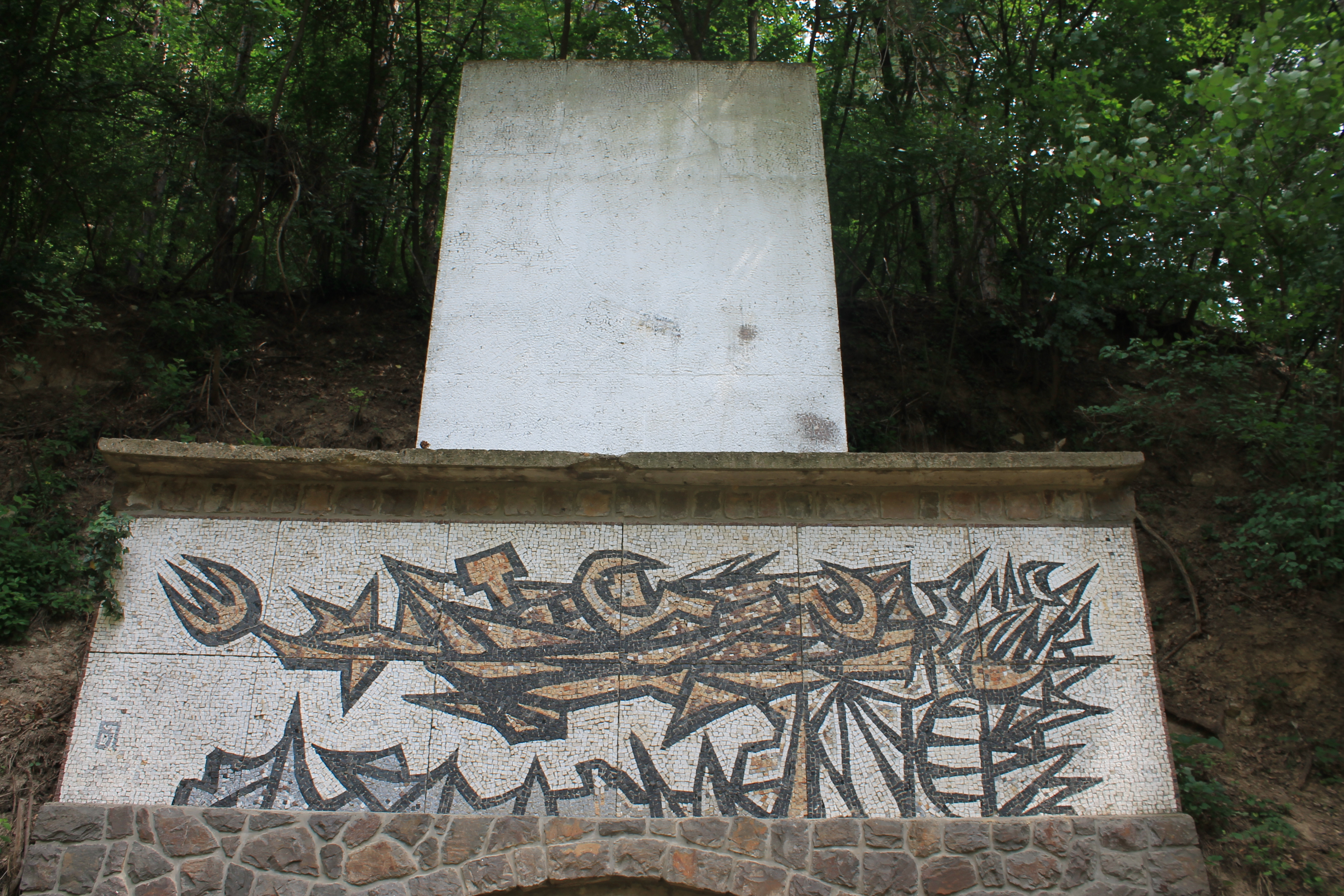

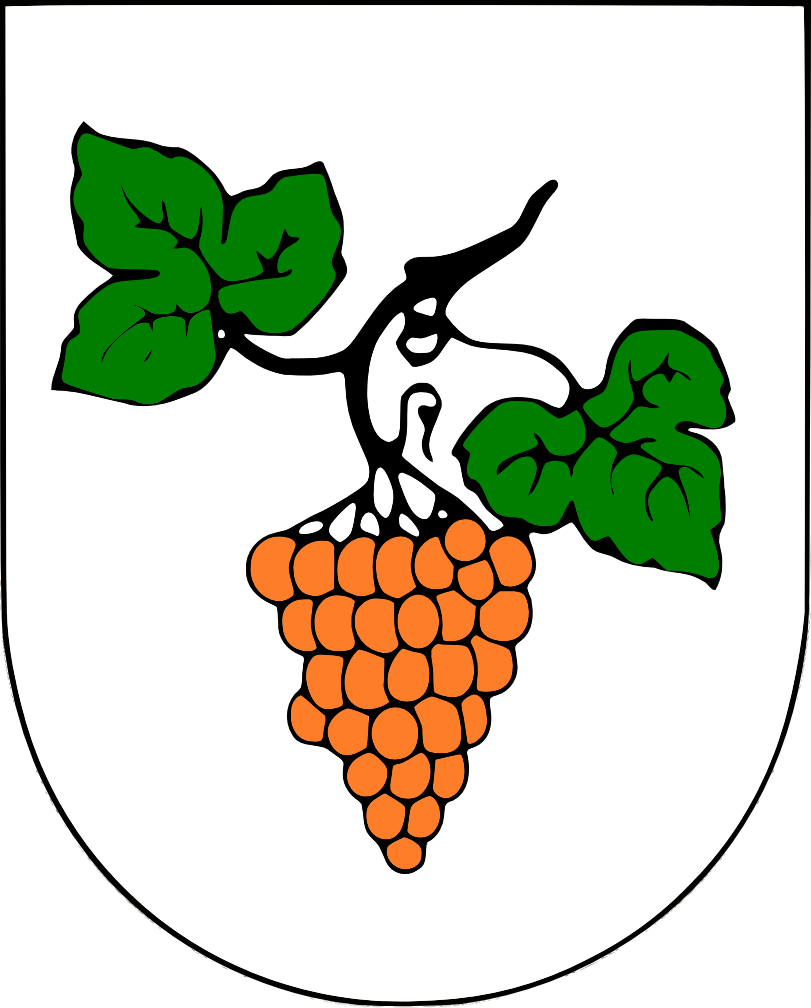
- Seal
- Interactive map of Rakovac
- Location within Vojvodina Location within Serbia Location within Europe
- Coordinates: 45°12′24″N 19°45′57″E
- Country: Serbia
- Province: Vojvodina
- Region: Syrmia (Podunavlje)
- District: South Bačka
- Municipality: Beočin

Population (2022)
  - Total: 2,137
- Time zone: UTC+1 (CET)
  - Summer (DST): UTC+2 (CEST)

Rakovac (Serbian Cyrillic: Раковац) is a village in Serbia. It is situated in the Beočin municipality which is in the Vojvodina province. Although, the village is geographically located in Syrmia, it is part of the South Bačka District. The village has a Serb ethnic majority and its population numbering 2,137 people as of the 2022 census. Rakovac is divided into two parts: Stari Rakovac ("old Rakovac") and Novi Rakovac ("new Rakovac"). Geographically it is close to the big city of Novi Sad.

The Rakovac monastery is located in Stari Rakovac.

== History ==
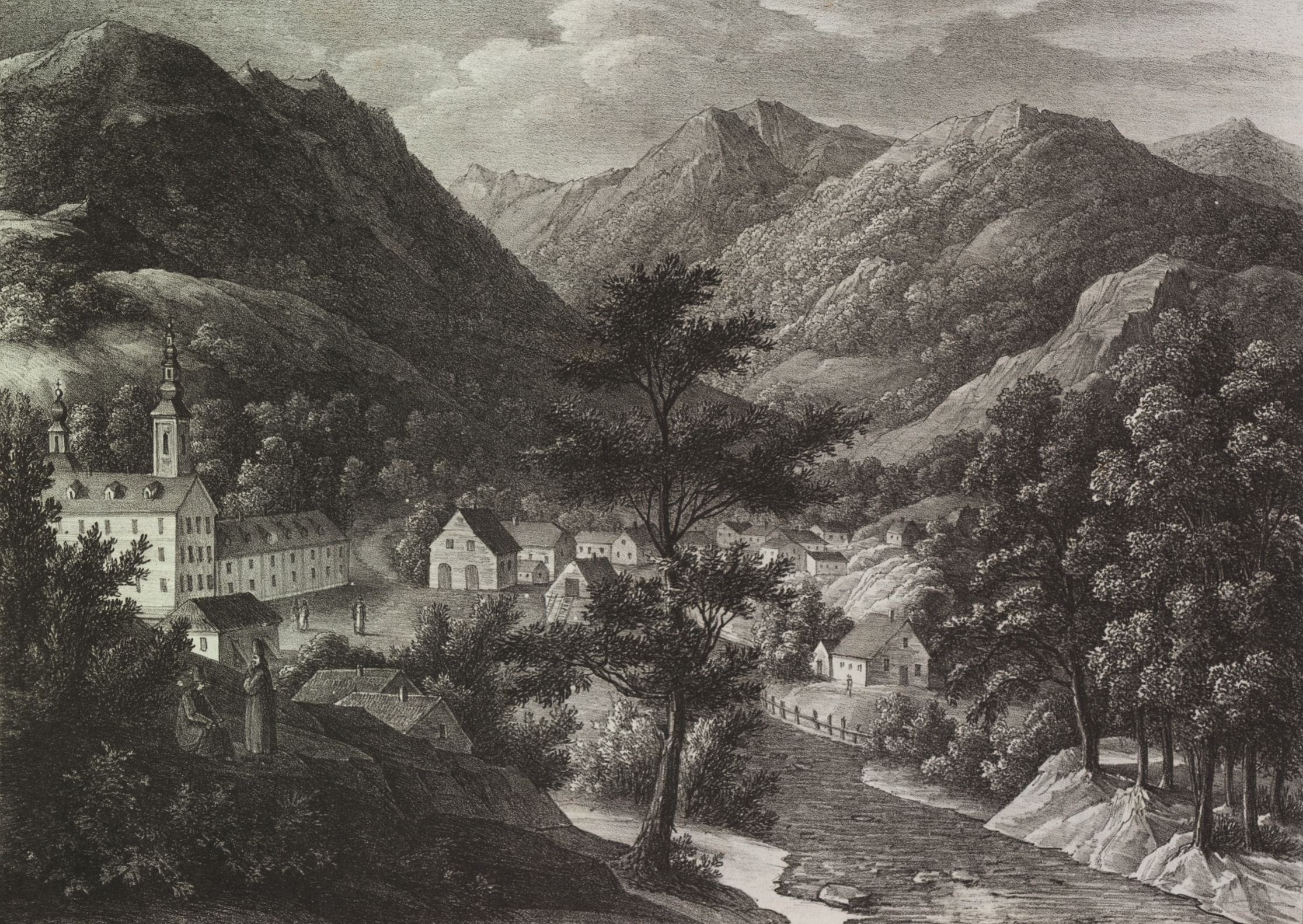
Rakovac in 1826

During the Axis occupation in World War II, 91 civilians were killed in Rakovac by fascists.

== Historical population ==
- 1961: 1,060
- 1971: 968
- 1981: 1,081
- 1991: 1,375
- 2002: 1,989
- 2011: 2,248
- 2022: 2,137

== See also ==
- Rakovac.rs - an independent, unofficial guide to the village of Rakovac.
- List of places in Serbia
- List of cities, towns and villages in Vojvodina
