= Popina (Trstenik) =

- Village
- Location within Serbia
- Coordinates: 43°35′49″N 20°56′59″E
- Country: Serbia
- District: Rasina District
- Municipality: Trstenik

Population (2002)
  - Total: 384
- Time zone: UTC+1 (CET)
  - Summer (DST): UTC+2 (CEST)

Popina is a village in the municipality of Trstenik, Serbia. According to the 2002 census, the village has a population of 384 people.
