= World War II monuments and memorials in Yugoslavia =

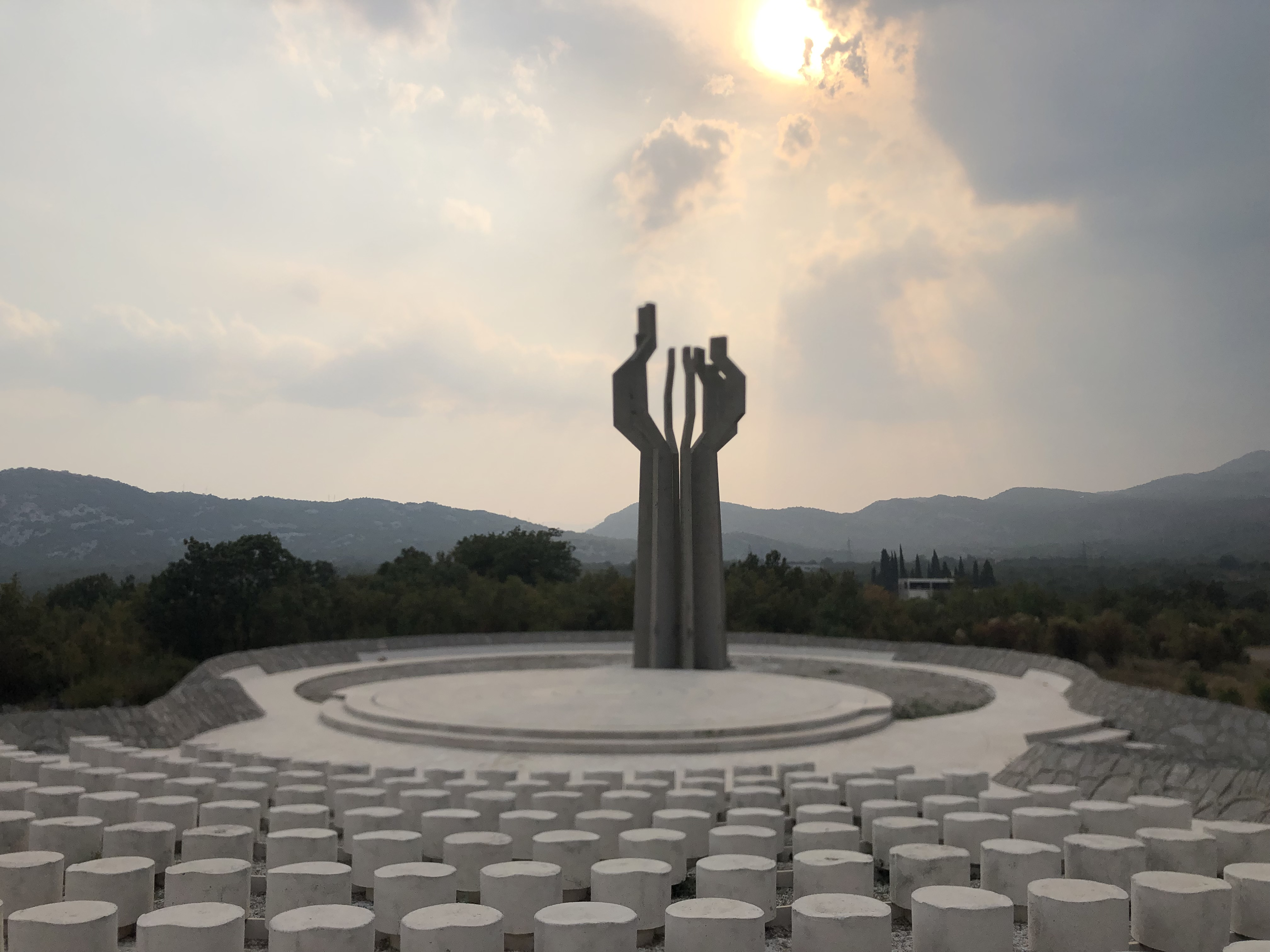
A memorial for the fallen from Montenegro's Lješanska Nahija region, 1980

The authorities of the Socialist Federal Republic of Yugoslavia established many World War II memorials during the country's existence. Several memorial sites were established between 1945 and 1960, though widespread building started after the founding of the Non-Aligned Movement.

Yugoslav president Josip Broz Tito commissioned several memorial sites and monuments in the 1960s and 1970s dedicated to World War II battles, and Nazi concentration camp sites. They were designed by notable sculptors, including Dušan Džamonja, Vojin Bakić, Miodrag Živković, Jordan and Iskra Grabul, and architects, including Bogdan Bogdanović, Svetlana Kana Radević and Gradimir Medaković. After Tito's death, a small number were built, and the monuments were popular visitor attractions in the 1980s as patriotic sites, and since the Yugoslav Wars and the dissolution of Yugoslavia, the sites are mostly abandoned.

In Slovenia, World War II Veteran Organisation and its branches yearly hold many commemorative events in regard with the subject of the monuments and people remember the fallen on the Day of the Dead.

On August 28, 2018, author Donald Niebyl published a book titled Spomenik Monument Database, the first-ever English-language guidebook on the WWII monuments of Yugoslavia, after conducting several years of intensive research.

For the list of World War II monuments in each republic of the Former Yugoslavia, see:

- List of World War II monuments and memorials in Bosnia and Herzegovina
- List of World War II monuments and memorials in Croatia
- List of World War II monuments and memorials in Montenegro
- List of World War II monuments and memorials in Macedonia
- List of World War II monuments and memorials in Serbia
- List of World War II monuments and memorials in Slovenia

== See also ==
- People's Heroes of Yugoslavia monuments
- World War II memorials and cemeteries in the Netherlands
- Canadian war memorials
