= Slobodište =

Coordinates: 43.5597°N 21.3322°E

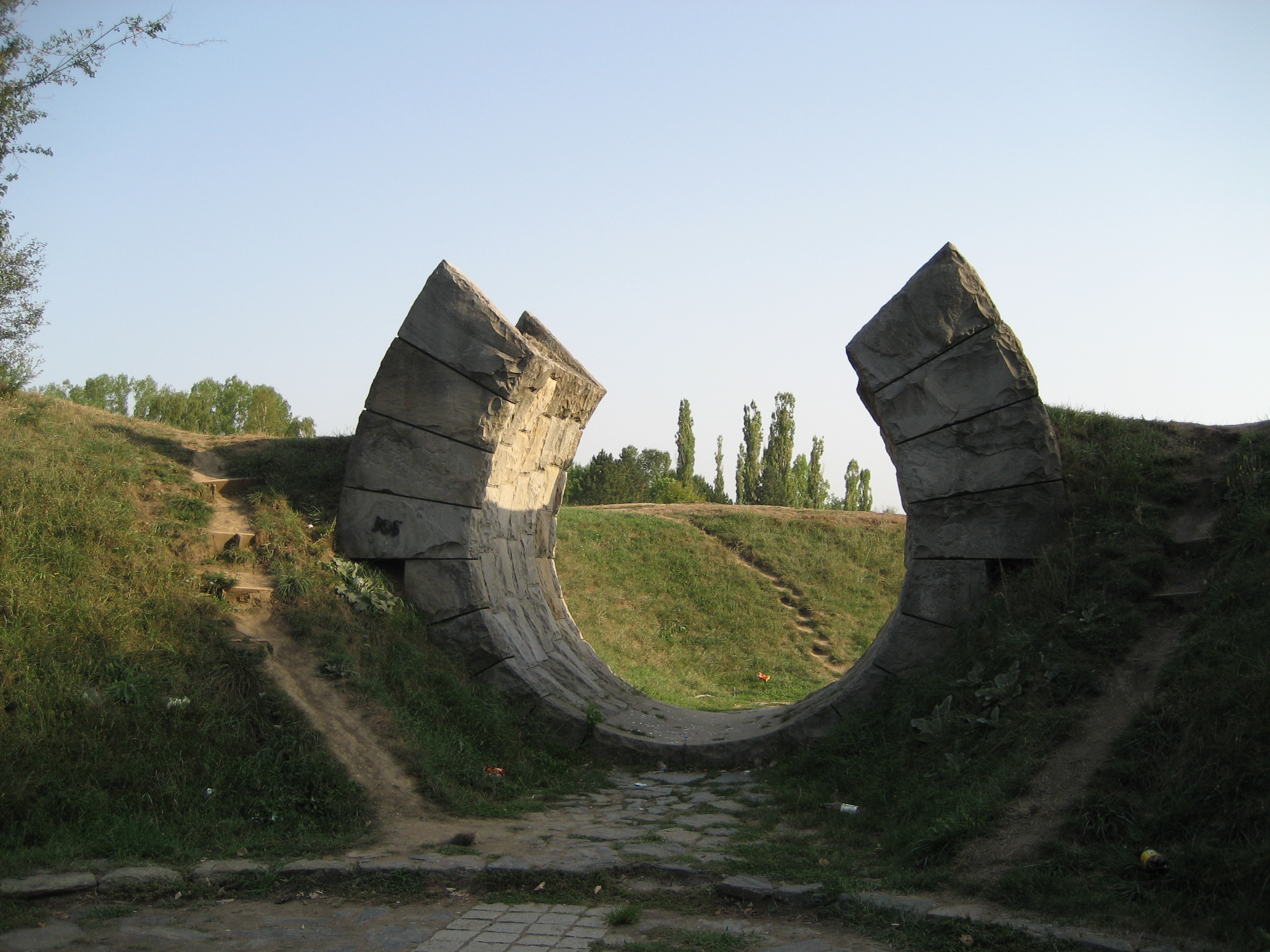
Slobodište, "Gates of Sun"

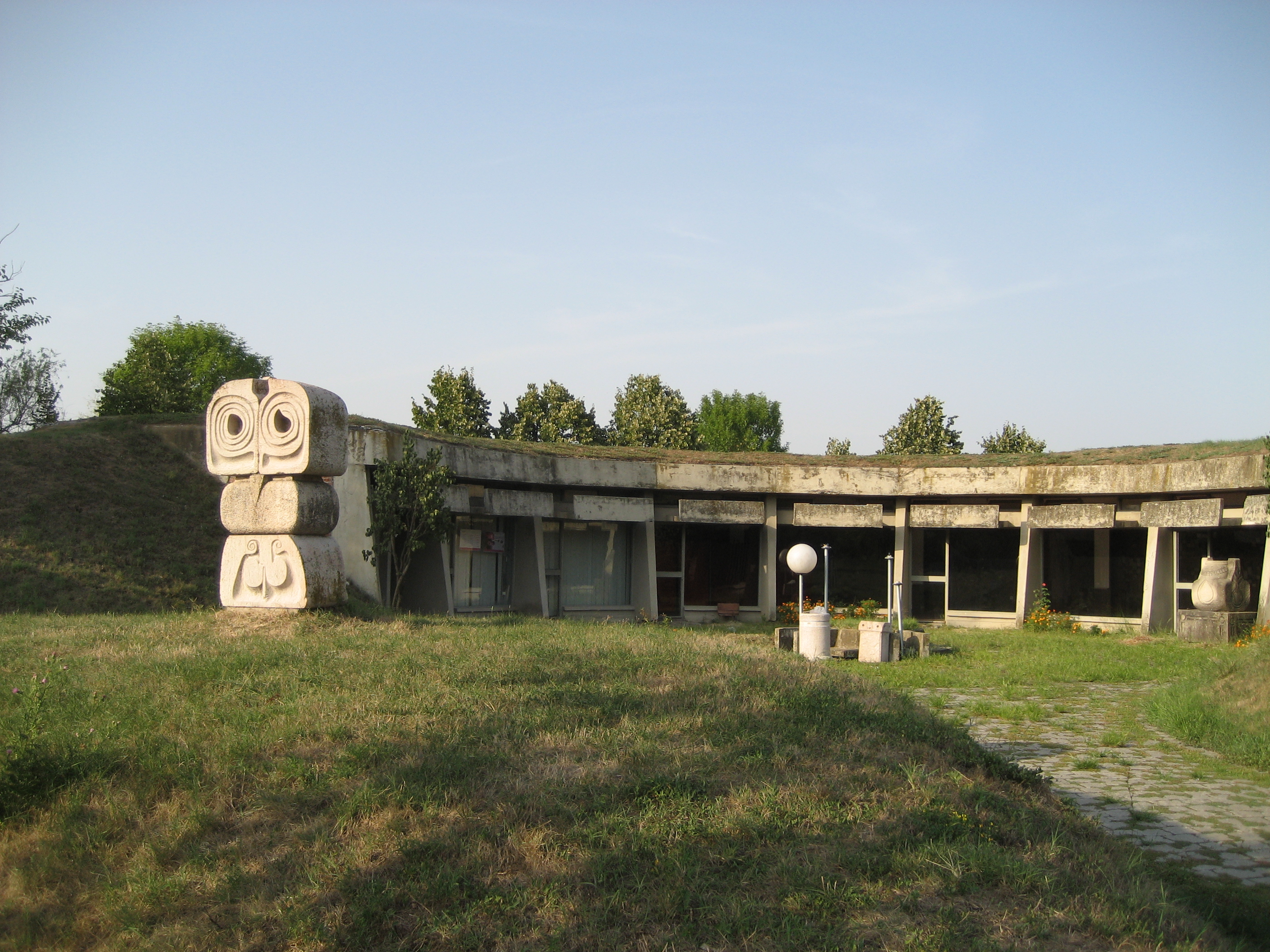
Cenotaph

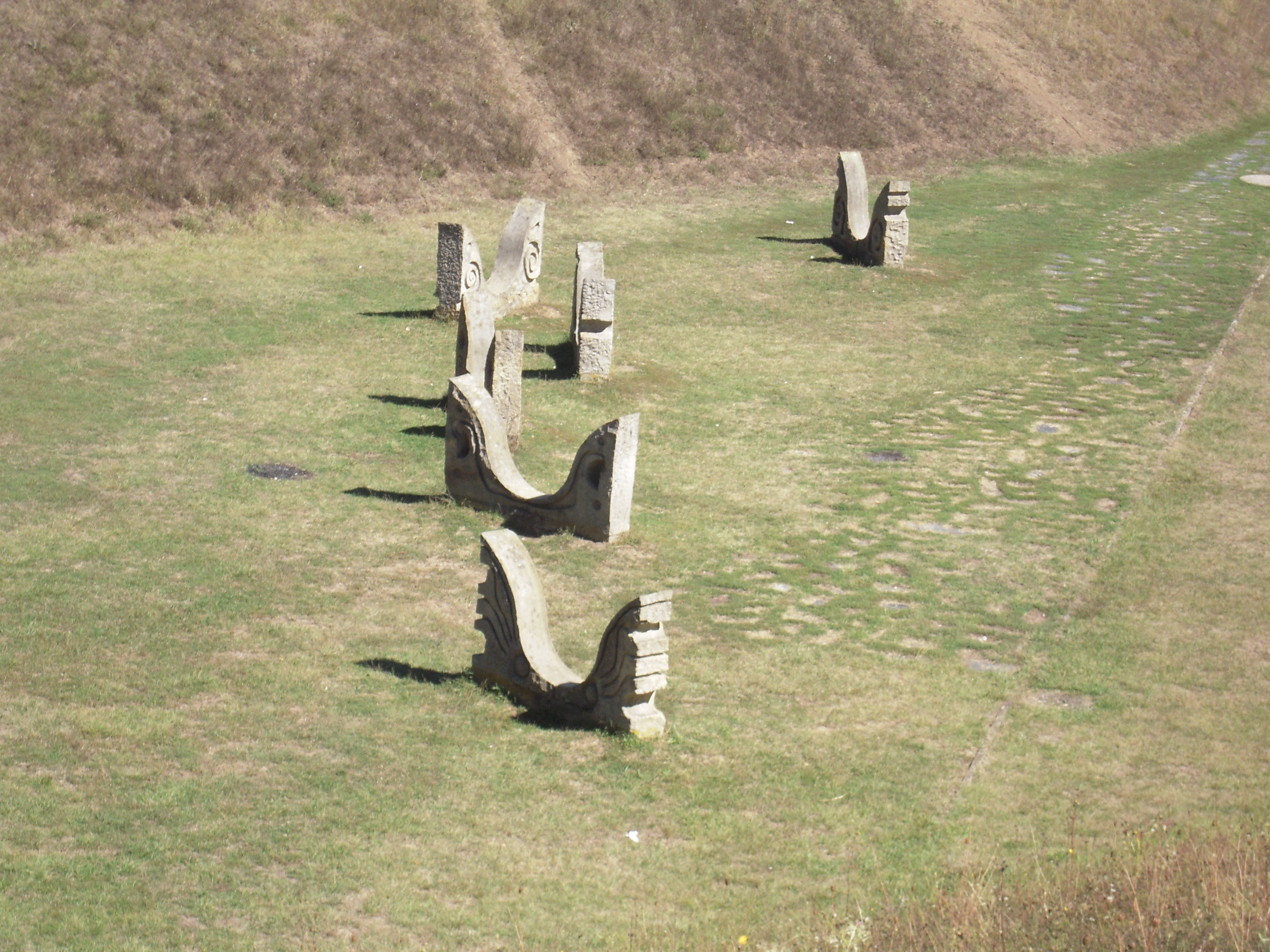
Stone birds

Slobodište (Serbian: Слободиште), also known as Mount Bagdala near Kruševac, is the place where the shootings of nearly 1,650 people, mainly Partisans, Chetniks, and Roma occurred during the German occupation of Serbia.

== Mass execution in June 1943 ==
The largest execution in Kruševac happened on 29 June 1943, when 324 people were executed. This was initially to be carried out on 28 June but as that was Vidovdan, Milan Nedić's government was able to move the execution a day later. Prior to the execution, SS general August Meyszner arrived in Kruševac and signed the poster, noting that he himself ordered this mass execution. After that, 162 members of the Yugoslav Army in the Fatherland (Chetniks) and 162 members of the People's Liberation Movement of Yugoslavia (Partisans) were executed. Executions were also carried out within the Criminal Bureau, and bodies were buried in Bagdala.

During the occupation, Bulgarian soldiers carried out executions repeatedly in Kruševac, along with armed Arnauts in German uniforms and members of the Dimitrije Ljotić's Serbian Volunteer Corps.

== Numbers ==
According to available documents and salvaged German documents about the shooting, 1,650 people were executed in Kruševac during the entire occupation. The executions were carried out in the following order:

Execution date	Number of executed
23 September 1941	1
24 September 1941	88
12 October 1942	10
12 December 1942	10
15 December 1942	10
5 February 1943	40
March 1943	358
12 April 1943	5
29 April 1943	10
June 1943	530
July 1943	550
9 August 1943	9
20 November 1943	1
12 June 1944	10
TOTAL	1,642

== Slobodište Memorial Complex ==
"Slobodište" Memorial Complex was built in the vicinity of the shootings, and was named like that because in one of the mounds were found the remains of soldiers of Rasina partisan detachment, who were called "bringers of freedom" of the city of Kruševac ("Slobodište" is a name derived from the Serbian word for "freedom").

Architect Bogdan Bogdanović realized the monument at the suggestion of Dobrica Ćosić, soldier of the Rasina partisan detachment. Building of the complex lasted from 1960 until 1965.

There is a following inscription on the monument:"Under this sky, human, straighten up. Bread and freedom are the same thing to us."

The basic elements of the monument are burial mounds, "Gate of Death", "Valley of giving respect" with 12 stone birds and "Valley of the living ones", and amphitheater with a stage and an auditorium.

Today, "Slobodište" is a historical complex which is a place widely visited by citizens of Kruševac, as well as foreign tourists.
