= Kosta Angeli Radovani =

Croatian sculptor

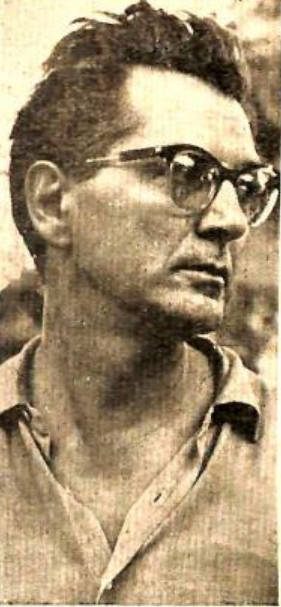
Kosta Angeli Radovani in 11.10.1962 in Kumanovo

Kosta Angeli Radovani (6 October 1916 – 27 February 2002) was a Croatian sculptor and member of the Croatian Academy of Sciences and Arts.

After World War II he was one of the founders of the Zagreb Academy of Applied Arts in 1950 where he was the head of the Department of Sculpture until the academy closed in 1955. From 1977 until his retirement in 1987, he worked as a professor at the Department of Sculpture at the Faculty of Fine Arts in Sarajevo. He was a guest professor at the International Summer Academy in Salzburg in 1987, 1988 and 1991.

In his artistic work, he primarily dealt with the human figure, and his oeuvre contains many nudes and portraits. He made over 30 large-scale public sculptures, such as the one dedicated to the Drežnica Uprising (1949), a monument dedicated to the Zagreb victims who died in WWII in Dotrščina, Zagreb (1988–1991) and the monument dedicated to Franjo Bučar located on the Sports Square, Zagreb (1991). A series of some 20 female nudes entitled Dunje is considered to hold an important place in his oeuvre. Radovani also made small sculptures and medals and his opus contains 400 portraits and almost the same number of portrait medals, as well as over 800 small sculptures.

Radovani exhibited at many solo exhibitions in Croatia and abroad (Athens, Prague, Tunis, Salzburg, Pordenone), and participated in more than 600 group exhibitions, 50 of which were of international significance. In 1950 he participated at the Venice Biennale along with Vanja Radauš, Vojin Bakić and Zoran Mušič. In 1973 he had a retrospective exhibition at the Modern Gallery in Zagreb, on which occasion a monograph was published to mark 40 years of his work. He received many awards for his work and in 1987 he received the Vladimir Nazor Award for life achievement.

== Works published on Kosta Angeli Radovani ==
- Dragojević, Danijel - Kosta Angeli Radovani, (Mala likovna biblioteka sv XIX, Naprijed, Zagreb, 1961).
- Maleković, Vladimir - Kosta Angeli Radovani, (Modern Gallery, Zagreb and the Graphic Institute of Croatia, 1973).
- Maleković, Vladimir - Kosta Angeli Radovani, (Modern Art Gallery, Zagreb and the Graphic Institute of Croatia, 1981).
- Zidić, Igor - Kosta Angeli Radovani, (Naprijed, 1989).
- Banov, Ive Šimat & Maroevic, Tonko - Kosta Angeli Radovani, (HDLU, Zagreb, 1999).

== See also ==
- Croats of Italy
