= Bogdan Bogdanović (architect) =

Serbian architect, urbanist and essayist (1922–2010)

- Богдан Богдановић
- Born: 20 August 1922; Belgrade, Kingdom of Serbs, Croats and Slovenes
- Died: 18 June 2010 (aged 87); Vienna, Austria
- Education: University of Belgrade
- Occupation: Architect
- Awards: Herder Prize (1997)
- Buildings: Jasenovac monument; Partisan cemetery in Mostar

Bogdan Bogdanović (Serbian Cyrillic: Богдан Богдановић; 20 August 1922 – 18 June 2010) was a Serbian and Yugoslav architect, urbanist and essayist. Bogdanović fought in World War II as a partisan, and embarked on an academic architectural career at the University of Belgrade's Faculty of Architecture after the end of the war. He became renowned from the 1950s onward for designing a number of monuments and memorials commemorating victims and resistance fighters of World War II in Yugoslavia; his concrete sculpture titled Stone Flower near the site of Jasenovac concentration camp attracted particular attention.

Bogdanović was also known for his essays on urbanism and architecture, and was active in Yugoslav Communist Party politics, serving as Mayor of Belgrade from 1982 to 1986. He was dismayed by the rise of nationalism in Yugoslavia, and went into self-imposed exile in 1993, dying in Vienna in 2010.

== Life ==
Bogdanović was born into a family of leftist intellectuals. His father Milan Bogdanović was a literary critic, long-time president of the Association of Writers and director of the National Theatre.

Beginning in 1940, Bogdan studied architecture at the University of Belgrade. He participated in World War II ("a bit" in his words) as a partisan, becoming a member of the Communist Party, and was seriously wounded in eastern Bosnia. Despite his injuries, he continued his academic career after the war, graduating in 1950, becoming a teaching assistant at the department for urbanism (from 1953), then a docent in 1960, extraordinary professor and president of the Yugoslav Union of Architects in 1964, dean of the Faculty of Architecture and a corresponding member of the Serbian Academy of Sciences and Arts (SANU) in 1970, and full professor in 1973. In 1981 he resigned from SANU, and he was conferred emeritus status in 1987.

Being an ardent leftist, Bogdanović opposed the increasing nationalism espoused by state leaders since the early 1980s. Nonetheless, he became Mayor of Belgrade in 1982 on the initiative of Ivan Stambolić, then chairman of the League of Communists of Serbia. Bogdanović served one term in office, until 1986. During this time, he organised an international competition for the complete redevelopment of New Belgrade, a planned area on the left bank of the Sava river. All submissions to this competition have since disappeared.

After his term of office, he was appointed by Slobodan Milošević as a member of the Central Committee of the League of Communists of Yugoslavia, the party's supreme governing body. He accepted the post under the condition that he would not be required to attend committee meetings because he "had more important things to do". In the following year he sent Milošević an anti-nationalist letter over 60 pages long, including a Stalino-dictionary, an appendix satirising the recipient's nationalist rhetoric, and the famous Lamentation for Serbia, which discussed the theme of Serbia "being tired" (of its leaders). The Central Committee replied, "You can send the letter, in which you criticise the work of the eighth meeting and which has not reached us, to the Central Committee if you consider it necessary". The letter, in combination with other remarks about Milošević, led to attempts of breaking into Bogdanović's apartment, death threats, and his exclusion from the Central Committee. This, however, did not prevent him from renewing his anti-nationalist statements when the Yugoslav wars started at the beginning of the 1990s, once more turning Bogdanović into a target for violent attacks and a defamation campaign run by the Serbian state media.

In 1993, Bogdanović went into self-imposed exile to Paris with his wife Ksenija. However, since the Yugoslav émigré circle there had strong nationalistic tendencies, the couple moved on to settle in Vienna upon invitation of his friend, the writer and translator Milo Dor.

Bogdanović died in a hospital in Vienna on 18 June 2010, following a heart attack. He was cremated in Vienna, and his urn was sent to Belgrade. Although the city offered a grave for him in the Alley of the Greats at the Belgrade New Cemetery, upon his wife's request, and the approval of the Jewish community, Bogdanović's remains have been placed in the Sephardic cemetery where his monument to the Jewish victims of fascism and fallen soldiers stands.

== Teaching and writing ==
Our motto was as simple as it was complicated: The beauty and the meaning of an architectonic sign can only be apprehended and explained in the all-encompassing sense of a wholeness expanded to a novel. It appears to me that the wise and noble starting point of our beautiful and placid erstwhile games, today, on this side of hate and cruelty, can hardly be imagined.

— Bogdanović in Der verdammte Baumeister about the "village school"

At the University of Belgrade, Bogdanović held the lecture course The development of housing schemes (later called History of town), starting in 1962. As professor and dean, he tried to reform the teaching of architecture and introduce grassroots democracy at the university, but the party forced him to abdicate before he could put his plans into practice.

In 1976, he began to teach in an abandoned village school in Mali Popović near Belgrade to realise an alternative project, namely his "village school for the philosophy of architecture". The course was called Symbolic forms in allusion to Ernst Cassirer, had no fixed timetable and employed the invention of new writing systems, the interpretation of non-existent texts, as well as methods akin to free association and gematria. Fourteen years later, when henchmen of Milošević raided the school in the aftermath of Bogdanović's letter, much of the collected material – the documentation of the lessons, drawings, audio- and videotapes, optical devices – was destroyed.

Bogdanović wrote numerous articles about urbanism, especially about its mythic and symbolic aspects, some of which appeared in international journals such as El País, Die Zeit, and others.

== Works ==
The architectonic and literary work of Bogdanović is characterised by an abundance of ornaments. It is influenced by Romanticism and Victorian architecture, surrealism, metaphysics, Jewish symbolism and Kabbalah. Bogdanović has opposed the architectural theories of Adolf Loos developed in the essay Ornament and Crime, and argued for the "semantic dignity of the ornamental sign".

=== Memorials ===
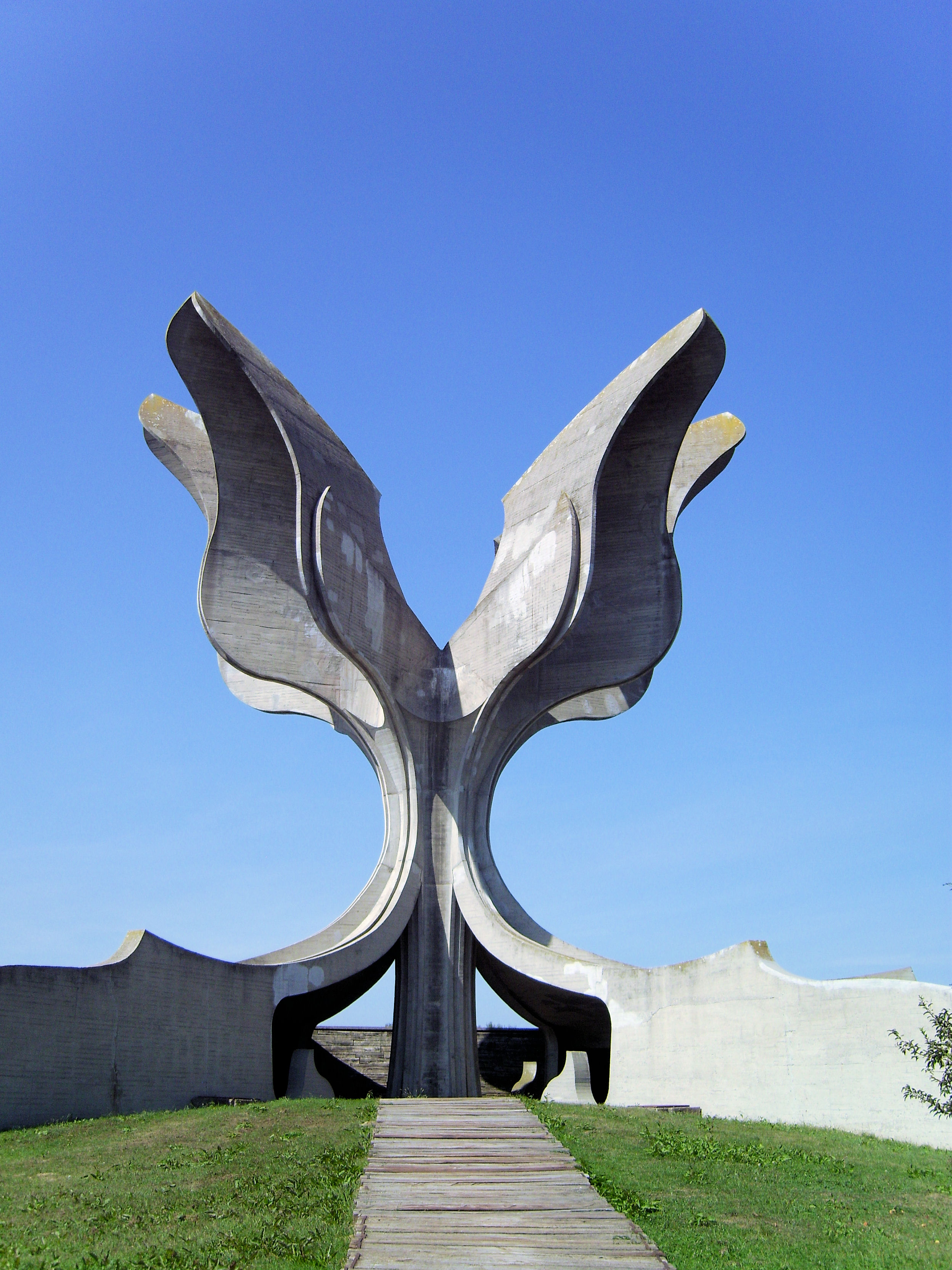
Jasenovac monument (the Flower of Stone), Jasenovac Memorial Park

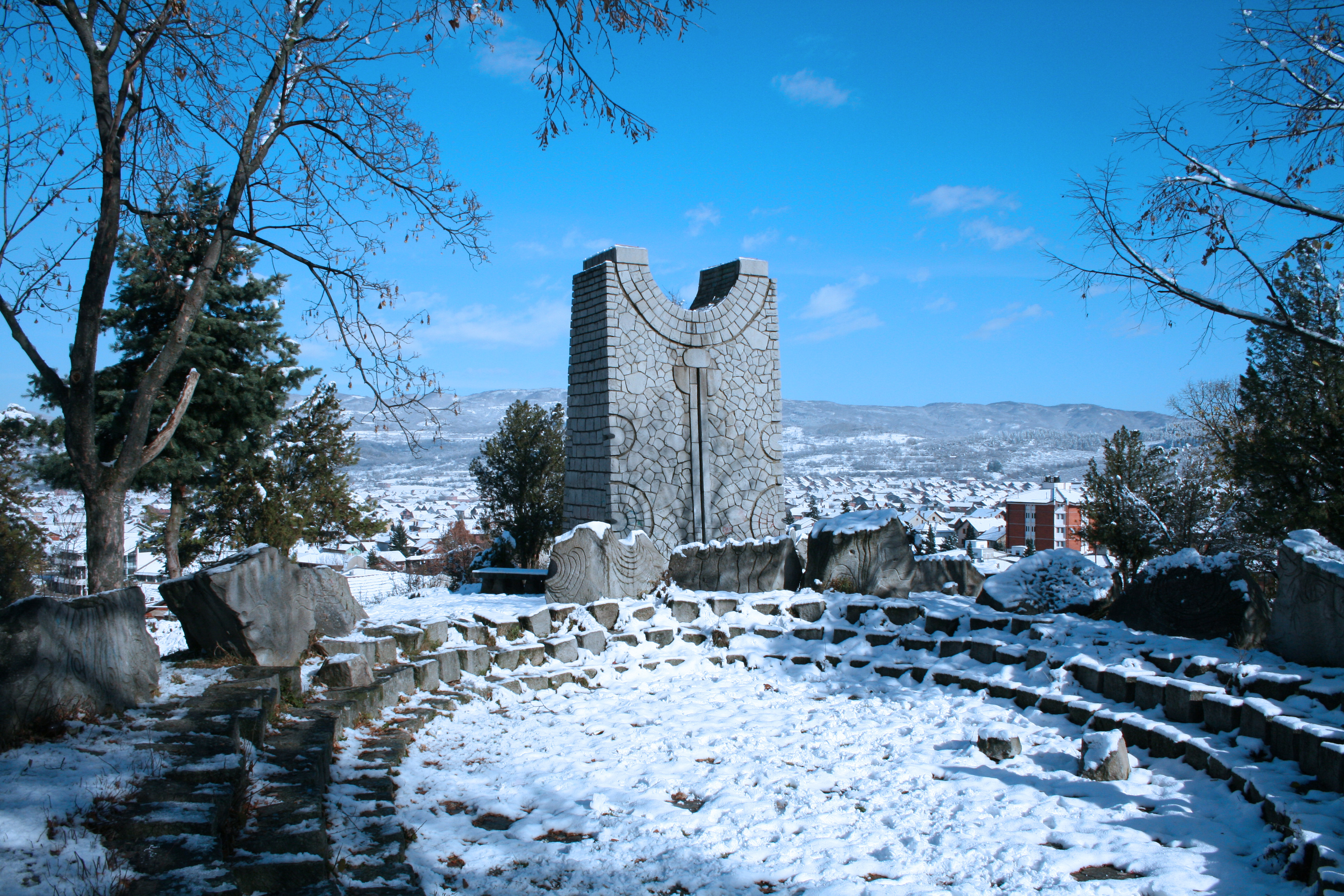
Shrine to the fallen freedom fighters, Vlasotince

In 1951, Bogdan Bogdanović won a competition for the design of a memorial to the Jewish victims of fascism, to be built on the Sephardic cemetery in Belgrade. Although not religious himself, this contact with Jewish esotericism strongly influenced his further work. From then on until 1981, he was assigned by Josip Broz Tito to devise more than 20 monuments and memorial places against fascism and militarism, which were erected in all republics of Yugoslavia. To work as cenotaphs for all victims of fascism, regardless of nationality and religion, they lack any symbols of communism or other ideologies. Instead, they rely on archaic, mythological forms, sharply contrasting with the principles of Socialist realism. This contrast also served Tito's wish to emphasise his country's independence from the Soviet Union.

All of the memorials are built of stone, shaped by local untrained chisellers whom Bogdanović preferred to ones with formal education, who were inflexible in his opinion. The notable exception, the Jasenovac monument, consists of prestressed concrete, the formwork for which was constructed by shipwrights. Somewhat incongruously, it is known as the Flower of Stone.

Examples of these monuments are:

- Memorial to the Jewish victims of fascism, Belgrade, Sephardic cemetery, 1952
- Memorial grave to the victims of fascism, Sremska Mitrovica, 1960
- Group cenotaph to the fallen soldiers of the resistance, Prilep, 1961
- Symbolical necropolis, Slobodište (near Kruševac), 1961
- Partisan monument, Mostar, 1965
- Jasenovac monument, Jasenovac, 1966
- Memorial cemetery, Leskovac, 1971
- Monument to the Massacre in Arapova Dolina, Leskovac, 1971
- Group cenotaph, Bela Crkva (near Krupanj), 1971
- Memorial to the fallen soldiers in all wars of liberation, Knjaževac, 1971
- Shrine dedicated to the Serb and Albanian partisans in the 1941–1945 war, Kosovska Mitrovica, 1973
- War grave, Štip, 1974
- Group cenotaph of victims, Novi Travnik, 1975
- Shrine to the fallen freedom fighters, Vlasotince, 1975
- Freedom monument, Berane, 1977
- Dudik Memorial Park, Vukovar, 1980
- Memorial area with mausoleum for the warriors, Čačak, 1980
- Garavice memorial park and with cenotaph dedicated to the 12,000 civil Nazi victims, Bihać, 1981
- Mausoleum dedicated to the first who died in the anti-Fascist uprisings, Popina (near Vrnjačka Banja), 1981
- Guardian of Freedom, Klis (near Split), 1987 (demolished in 1996)

=== Settlements ===
Urbanity is one of the highest abstractions of the human spirit. To me, to be an urban man means to be neither a Serb nor a Croat, and instead to behave as though these distinctions no longer matter, as if they stopped at the gates of the city.

— Bogdan Bogdanović

Bogdanović refused to participate in the planning of national housing estates which looked like "coffins of concrete" to him and had "only two types of windows". Consequently, he built only a single settlement: a housing estate for the hydrotechnical institute "Jaroslav Černi" at the foot of the mountain Avala near Belgrade, finished in 1953. The houses are mostly built of stone; and with their surrealistic, old-fashioned style, heavily framed windows and oversized chimneys, they are deliberately set apart from the international style that dominated in post-WW2 Yugoslavia.

Other settlements were planned in great detail, but never really intended to be built. Among those is a town in northern Montenegro, designed for local clients, and a mythological "town at the bottom of the lake (Biograd)" which Bogdanović designed for his own pleasure.

=== Other works of architecture ===
Other works of architecture include the reconstruction of the villa of Queen Natalija (Smederevo, 1961), Adonis' altar (Labin, 1974) and the Tomb of Dušan Petrović-Šane (Aranđelovac, 1980).

=== Literature ===
Books and essays in Serbo-Croatian include:

- Mali urbanizam [Little urbanism]. Belgrade/Zagreb: Narodna Prosvjeta. 1958.
- Urbanističke mitologeme [Urbanistic mythologemes]. Belgrade: Vuk Karadžić. 1966. LCCN 68109766.
- Urbs & logos: ogledi iz simbologije grada [Urbs and logos: essays on the symbolism of town]. Niš: Gradina. 1976. LCCN 77457636.
- Gradoslovar [Dictionary of town terminology]. Belgrade: Vuk Karadžić. 1982. LCCN 83111414.
- Povratak grifona: crtačka heuristička igra po modelu Luisa Karola [The return of the griffon: a drawing heuristic game modeled on Lewis Carroll]. Belgrade: Jugoart. 1983. LCCN 8686233117.
- Zaludna mistrija: doktrina i praktika bratstva zlatnih (crnih) brojeva [The Futile Trowel: Doctrine and practice of the Brotherhood of golden (black) numbers]. Bjelovar: NIŠRO "Prosvjeta". 1984.
- Krug na četiri ćoška [The circle on four angles]. Belgrade: Nolit. 1986. ISBN 86-19-00406-9.
- Mrtvouzice: mentalne zamke staljinizma [Dead ends: mental traps of Stalinism]. Zagreb: August Cesarec. 1988. ISBN 86-393-0108-5.
- Knjiga kapitela [The book of the capital]. Sarajevo: Svjetlost. 1990. ISBN 86-01-01887-4.
- Grad kenotaf [Town cenotaph]. Zagreb: Durieux. 1993. LCCN 93227406.
- Glib i krv [Mud and blood]. Belgrade: Helsinki Committee for Human Rights in Serbia. 2001. ISBN 86-7208-049-1.
- Grad i budućnost [Town and the future]. Zagreb: Nakl. Mlinarec-Plavić. 2001. ISBN 953-6765-00-4.

Six of his books were published in German by Zsolnay and Wieser:

- Die Stadt und der Tod, Wieser Verlag, Klagenfurt – Salzburg 1993, ISBN 978-3-85129-090-5
- Der verdammte Baumeister: Erinnerungen [The doomed architect. Recollections], Zsolnay Verlag, Vienne 1997/2002, ISBN 978-3-552-04846-1 (a collection of essays translated into German by Milo Dor)
- Die Stadt und die Zukunft, Wieser Verlag, Klagenfurt – Salzburg 1997, ISBN 978-3-85129-201-5
- Vom Glück in den Städten, Zsolnay Verlag, Vienna 2002, ISBN 978-3-552-05178-2
- Die grüne Schachtel: Buch der Träume, Zsolnay Verlag, Vienna 2007, ISBN 978-3-552-05394-6

Of the essays written by Bogdanović, the following is available in English:

- Town and town mythology. Housing and planning conference papers. Vol. 5. The Hague: International Federation for Housing and Planning. 1971. LCCN 77374894.

== Memberships ==
Bogdanović was a founder member of the International Academy of Architecture which was established in 1987 and a foreign member of the Russian Academy of Architecture (from 1994), a corresponding member of the Bavarian Academy of Fine Arts (from 1998), and a member of the Collegium Europaeum Jenense (University of Jena; from 2000). In 2002 he was elected an honorary member of the Academy of Sciences and Arts of Bosnia and Herzegovina.

== Awards ==
Awards and prizes include:

- October Prize of the City of Belgrade (for the memorial in Sremska Mitrovica, 1961)
- Gold Medal of the City of Belgrade (October 1966)
- Menção honrosa ("honorable mention" at the São Paulo Art Biennial, 1973)
- Seventh of July Prize (1979)
- Anti-Fascist Council of National Liberation of Yugoslavia Prize (1981)
- International Piranesi Award (1989)
- Herder Prize (1997)
- Austrian Cross of Honour for Science and Art, 1st class (2002)
- Gold Medal for Meritorious Service to the Province of Vienna (2003)
- International Carlo Scarpa Prize for Gardens (for Jasenovac Memorial Site, 2007)
