= List of People's Heroes of Yugoslavia monuments =

The Order of the People's hero of Yugoslavia was awarded to 1,322 individuals in Yugoslavia, and 19 were awarded to foreigners. Many busts and memorials were built in honor of each People's hero. Each of them usually had a bust in his birthplace or at the place of his death. Most of these monuments are built in figurative style, but some of them were completely abstract, e.g. monument of Ivo Lola Ribar, built at Glamoč field in 1962.

For the list of monuments of the People's Heroes in the each Republic of Former Yugoslavia, see:

- List of People's Heroes of Yugoslavia monuments in Bosnia and Herzegovina
- List of People's Heroes of Yugoslavia monuments in Croatia
- List of People's Heroes of Yugoslavia monuments in Montenegro
- List of People's Heroes of Yugoslavia monuments in North Macedonia
- List of People's Heroes of Yugoslavia monuments in Serbia
- List of People's Heroes of Yugoslavia monuments in Slovenia

== See also ==
- Yugoslav Partisans
- List of Yugoslav World War II monuments and memorials
