= List of People's Heroes of Yugoslavia monuments in Croatia =

There were 1,322 individuals who were decorated by the Order of the People's hero of Yugoslavia between 1942 and 1973. Many busts and memorials were built in honor of each People's hero. Each of them usually had a bust in his birthplace or at the place of his death. Most of these monuments are built in figurative style, but some of them were completely abstract, for example, monument of Ivo Lola Ribar, built at Glamoč field in 1962.

Large number of People's heroes' busts and monuments in Dalmatia, Slavonia and central Croatia were removed from public places or destroyed during the 1990s as a part of revisionism process. However, monuments of People's heroes are mostly intact in Istria, Hrvatsko Primorje and Hrvatsko Zagorje.

== Monument list ==
Image	Name	Location	Notes
Bust of Slobodan Bajić Paja	Bust of Slobodan Bajić Paja	Banovci	
Bust of Bogoljub Vukajlović Lala	Bust of Bogoljub Vukajlović Lala	Bobota	
Monument of Joakim Rakovac	Bust of Josip Skočilić	Bribir	
Monument of Joakim Rakovac	Bust of Tomo Strizić	Bribir	
Monument of Joakim Rakovac	Bust of Nikola Car - Crni	Crikvenica	
Bust of Bogoljub Vukajlović Lala	Bust of Ivan Marinković Slavko	Crikvenica	
Bust of Bogoljub Vukajlović Lala	Bust of Božidar Maslarić	Dalj	
	Bust of Ivan Lenac	Delnice	
	Bust of Viktor Bubanj	Delnice	
	Bust of Vjekoslav Klobučar	Delnice	
	Bust of Zdenko Petranović	Delnice	
	Bust of Nikola Rački	Delnice	
	Bust of Ivanka Trohar	Delnice	
	Bust of Milan Rustanbeg	Delnice	
	Bust of Ivo Lola Ribar	Đakovo	
Monument of Joakim Rakovac	Bust of Vilim Galjer	Đurđevac	
	Bust of Ivo Lola Ribar	Ilok	Dedicated to Ivo Lola Ribar, main secretary of Alliance of the communist youth of Yugoslavia and member of Central Committee of Communist party of Yugoslavia.
Monument of Joakim Rakovac	Bust of Većeslav Holjevac	Karlovac	
	Monument of Josip Broz Tito	Kumrovec	Designed by Antun Augustinčić, built in 1947.
Monument of Joakim Rakovac	Bust of Olga Ban	Pazin	
Monument of Joakim Rakovac	Bust of Giuseppe Budicin - Pino	Pazin	
Monument of Joakim Rakovac	Bust of Joakim Rakovac	Pazin	
Monument of Joakim Rakovac	Bust of Jože Šuran	Pazin	
Monument of Joakim Rakovac	Bust of Savo Vukelić	Pazin	
Monument of Joakim Rakovac	Monument of Joakim Rakovac	Poreč	
	Bust of Josip Broz Tito	Pula	
Bust of Bogoljub Vukajlović Lala	Bust of Juraj Kalc	Pula	
Monument of Joakim Rakovac	Bust of Olga Ban	Pula	
Monument of Moša Pijade	Bust of Viktor Bubanj	Rijeka	
Monument of Joakim Rakovac	Bust of Vitomir Širola	Rijeka	
Monument of Joakim Rakovac	Bust of Giuseppe Budicin - Pino	Rovinj	
Monument of Joakim Rakovac	Bust of Matteo Benussi - Cio	Rovinj	
	Memorial tomb with bust of Jozo Lozovina Mosor	Seget Donji	Designed by Ivan and Tonči Martinić, built in 1956. Dedicated to Jozo Lozovina Mosor, leader of the antifascist uprising in the Trogir area. Destroyed by explosive 1991.
	Bust of Jozo Lozovina Mosor	Trogir	Designed by Antun Augustinčić, built in 1956. Dedicated to Jozo Lozovina Mosor, leader of the antifascist uprising in the Trogir area. Destiny unknown.
	Bust of Jozo Lozovina Mosor	Trogir	Designed by Ivan Lončar Žan, built in 1986. Dedicated to Jozo Lozovina Mosor, leader of the antifascist uprising in the Trogir area. Destiny unknown.
Monument of Joakim Rakovac	Bust of Đuro Salaj	Valpovo	
	Bust of Florijan Bobić	Varaždin	
	Bust of Josip Bendak	Virovitica	
Monument of Joakim Rakovac	Bust of Vitomir Širola	Viškovo	
Monument of Joakim Rakovac	Bust of Srđan Uzelac	Vrbovsko	
	Monument of Većeslav Holjevac	Zagreb	Designed by Stjepan Gračan, built in 1994.
Monument of Joakim Rakovac	Bust of Većeslav Holjevac	Zagreb	
Monument of Joakim Rakovac	Bust of Joža Vlahović	Zagreb	
	Bust of Anka Butorac	Zagreb	In front of the school previously called "Anka Butorac"
	Bust of Pavle Pap	Zagreb	
	Bust of Ivo Lola Ribar	Zagreb	
Monument of Moša Pijade	Monument of Moša Pijade	Zagreb	Designed by Antun Augustinčić.
	Busts of Zdenka and Rajka Baković	Zagreb	Rajka Baković and Zdenka were both active in the antifascist struggle in Zagreb, but only Rajka was decorated by the Order of People's hero.
	Bust of Dragica Končar	Zagreb	
	Monument of Rade Končar	Zagreb	Designed by Vanja Radauš.

== See also ==
- People's Heroes of Yugoslavia monuments
- People's Heroes of Yugoslavia monuments in Bosnia and Herzegovina
- People's Heroes of Yugoslavia monuments in Serbia
- List of Yugoslav World War II monuments and memorials
- List of World War II monuments and memorials in Bosnia and Herzegovina
- List of World War II monuments and memorials in Croatia
- List of World War II monuments and memorials in Montenegro
- List of World War II monuments and memorials in North Macedonia
- List of World War II monuments and memorials in Serbia
- List of World War II monuments and memorials in Slovenia
