= List of People's Heroes of Yugoslavia monuments in Bosnia and Herzegovina =

Throughout the existence of the Socialist Republic of Bosnia and Herzegovina as part of the Socialist Federal Republic of Yugoslavia, the Yugoslav Partisan resistance in World War II was celebrated as the republic’s the foundational event. In post-Bosnian War Bosnia and Herzegovina, many monuments of the People’s Liberation War, including those dedicated to People’s Heroes, have undergone ethnonational reinterpretations.

Between 1942 and 1973, a total of 1,322 individuals were awarded the Order of the People's Hero of Yugoslavia. Numerous busts and memorials were erected in their honor, typically placed either in the hero’s birthplace or at the site of their death. Most of these monuments were executed in a figurative style, although some adopted a distinctly abstract form, such as the 1962 monument to Ivo Lola Ribar at the Glamoč field.

One of the largest concentrations of People's heroes' busts is in the Park of People's heroes in Banja Luka, which contains 21 busts.

== Monument list ==
Image	Name	Location	Notes
	Bust of Miloš Bajović	Bileća	
	Bust of Rade Bašić	Prijedor	
	Bust of Refik Bešlagić	Doboj	
	Monument of Josip Broz Tito	Sarajevo	Designed by Antun Augustinčić.
	Monument with a relief and quite by Josip Broz Tito	Sarajevo	Within the Vraca Memorial Park.
	Bust of Rudi Čajavec	Banja Luka	Dedicated to one of the first Yugoslav partisan pilots.
	Monument of Rudi Čajavec and Franjo Kluz	Međuvođe	Built at the place of the first Yugoslav partisans' airfield in Second World War. Dedicated to the first Yugoslav partisan pilots.
	Bust of Rodoljub Čolaković	Bijeljina	
	Bust of Rodoljub Čolaković	Sarajevo	
	Bust of Mihajlo Čvoro	Pale	
	Bust of Mihailo Đurić	Dobrljin	
	Bust of Petar Drapšin	Banja Luka	
	Bust of Pavle Džever	Mrkonjić Grad	
	Bust of Veselin Gavrić	Bijeljina	
	Bust of Stojan Grujičić	Kozarska Dubica	
	Bust of Josip Jovanović	Doboj	
	Bust of Ismet Kapetanović	Doboj	
	Bust of Franjo Kluz	Kozarska Dubica	Dedicated to one of the first Yugoslav partisan pilots.
	Bust of Miloš Kupres	Doboj	
	Bust of Simo Lukić	Doboj	
	Bust of Veselin Masleša	Banja Luka	
	Bust of Veselin Masleša	Sarajevo	
	Bust of Vaso Miskin Crni	Sarajevo	
	Bust of Vaso Miskin Crni	Trebinje	
	Bust of Žarko Papić	Bileća	
	Bust of Todor Panić	Doboj	
	Bust of Vladimir Perić Valter	Sarajevo	
	Monument of Moša Pijade	Jajce	Sculptor Stevan Bodnarov
	Bust of Miro Popara	Bileća	
	Bust of Đuro Pucar	Kneževo	
	Bust of Lepa Radić	Gašnica	
	Monument of Ivo Lola Ribar	Glamoč	Dedicated to Yugoslav partisan Ivo Lola Ribar. Designed by Mirko Ostoja, built in 1961.
	Bust of Boško Šiljegović	Kozarska Dubica	
	Bust of MIlan Simović	Pale	
Monument to Simo Šolaja	Monument of Simo Šolaja	Šipovo	A small river and a monument dedicated to Yugoslav partisan Simo Šolaja, who was born in the town.
	Bust of Tomica Španović	Donja Slabinja	
	Bust of Mladen Stojanović	Banja Luka	
	Monument of Mladen Stojanović	Prijedor	Designed by Sreten Stojanović. Dedicated to Mladen Stojanović, leader of the antifascist uprising at the Kozara mountain in 1941.
	Bust of Milorad Umjenović	Banja Luka	
	Bust of Todor Vujasinović	Doboj	
	Bust of Miloš Zekić	Šekovići	
	Busts of Dukica Grahovac, Vuko Torović, Savo Čolović and Obren Ivković	Nevesinje	
	Busts of Jovo Bijelić Joja, Milančić Miljević, Drago Mažar, Rada Vranješević, Ante Jakić, Drago Lang, Rade Ličina, Vahida Maglajlić, Šefket Maglajlić, Ivica Mažar, Josip Mažar Šoša, Danko Mitrov, Stjepan Pavlić, Branko Popović, Đuro Pucar Stari, Karlo Rojc, Milorad Umjenović, Hadžić Kasim, Ranko Šipka, Osman Karabegović and Boško Karalić	Banja Luka	Located on the Palih Boraca (Fallen Heroes) Square, located around the Monument to Fallen Heroes.
	Busts of Josip Broz Tito, Strahinja Mitrović Strajko, Fadil Jahić Španac, Cvjetin Mijatović Majo, Mitar Trifunović Učo, Slavko Mičić, Ivan Marković Irac, Vojo Ivanović Crnogorac, Svetozar Vuković Žarko, Ivo Lola Ribar, Moša Pijade, Miro Kerošević Guja, Muharem Merdžić, Pašaga Mandžić, Albin Herljević, Franjo Herljević, Petar Marković and Petar Miljanović	Tuzla	Located within the Slana Banja memorial park.

== See also ==
- People's Heroes of Yugoslavia monuments
- People's Heroes of Yugoslavia monuments in Croatia
- List of People's Heroes of Yugoslavia monuments in North Macedonia
- People's Heroes of Yugoslavia monuments in Serbia
- List of People's Heroes of Yugoslavia monuments in Slovenia
- List of Yugoslav World War II monuments and memorials
- List of World War II monuments and memorials in Bosnia and Herzegovina
- List of World War II monuments and memorials in Croatia
- List of World War II monuments and memorials in Montenegro
- List of World War II monuments and memorials in North Macedonia
- List of World War II monuments and memorials in Serbia
- List of World War II monuments and memorials in Slovenia
