= Monuments to the Slovene Partisans =

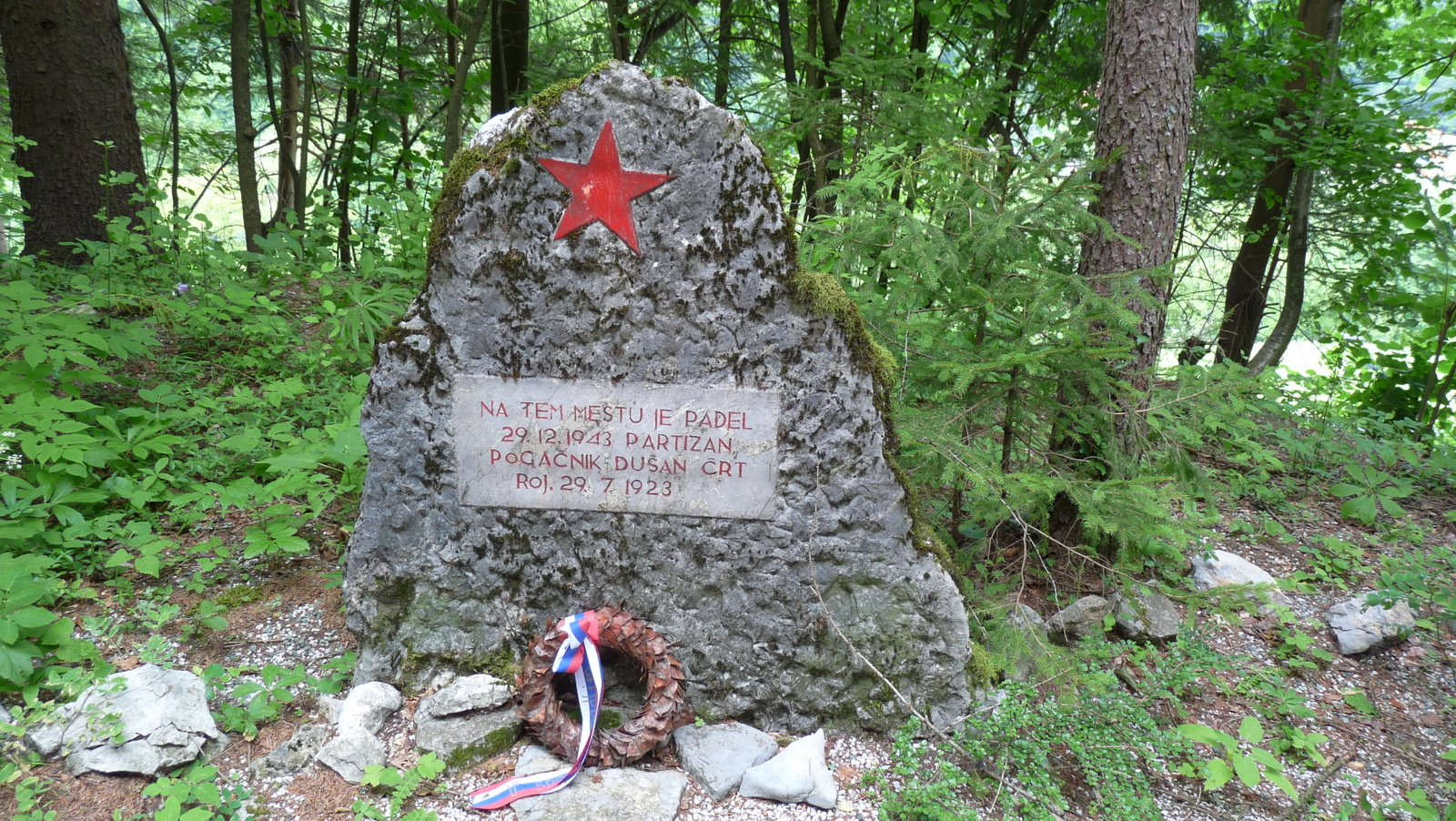
Monument at the place where a partisan was killed

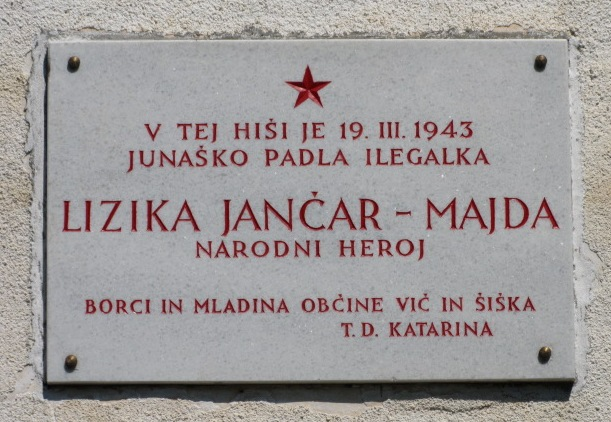
Partisan commemorative plaque on a house facade

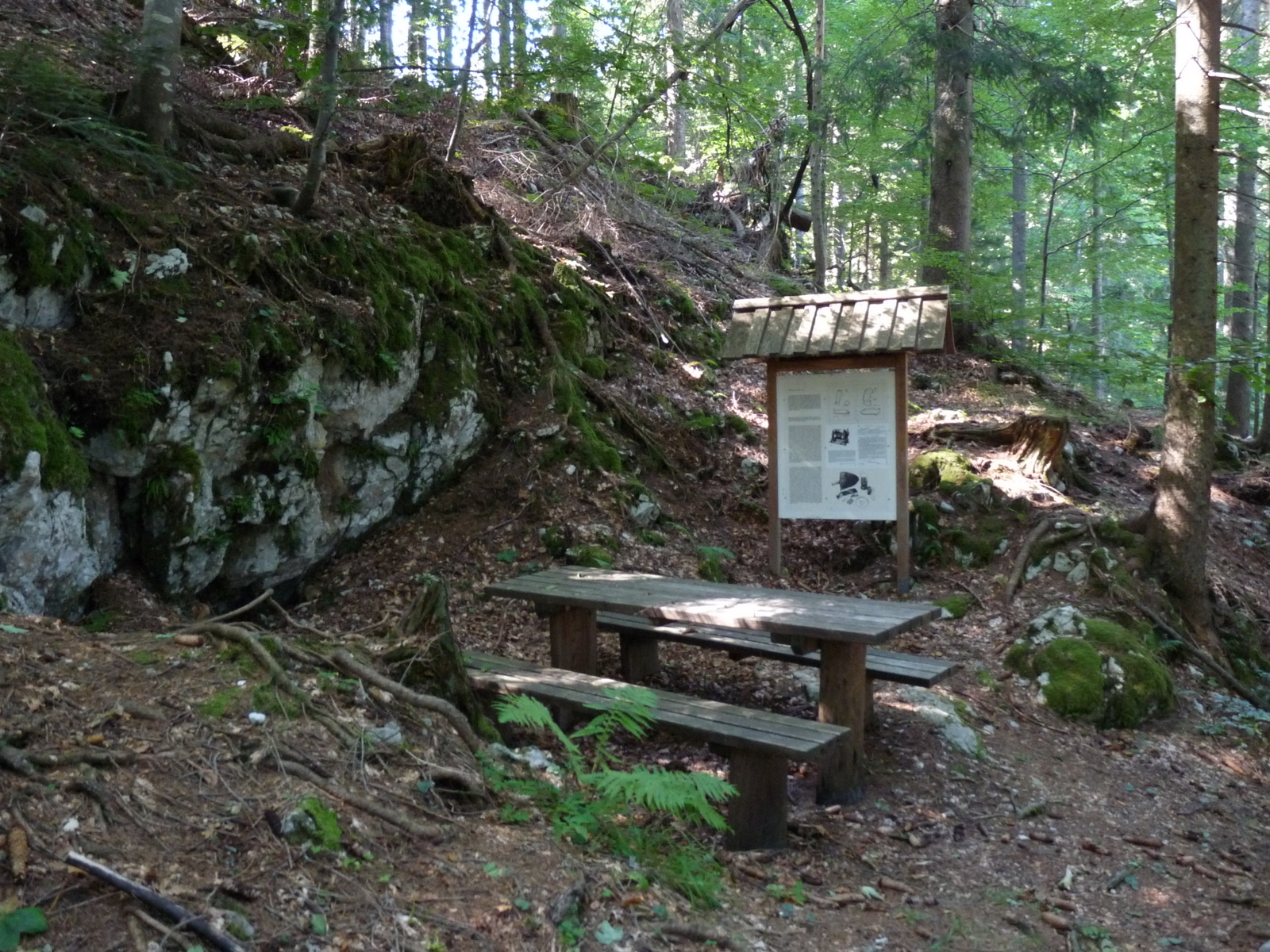
Information board in front of the cave on Jelovica plateau where an illegal partisan printing plant operated

Monuments to the Slovene Partisans is a common term for memorial plaques, obelisks, monuments, stationary and other sculptures erected after World War II in memory of deceased partisans and hostages shot or hung. They mark battle sites, partisan camps, prisons and other sites where the occupiers committed atrocities, places where illegal partisan hospitals and printing facilities were located, where resistance couriers crossed traffic routes, and at the sites where historical meetings and other important events took place during the war in Slovenia.

Partisan monuments are a part of World War II monuments and memorials. They can be found in the territory where partisan fighting went on, most frequently on the Balkans (i.e., the states of former Yugoslavia) and in Albania. They present a historical cultural specificity of the area.

In Slovenia, there are about 6,000 partisan monuments, 2,700 of them are registered in the national registry of cultural heritage (they represent the majority of total 2,900 World War II monuments in Slovenia). The most frequented regions are Gorenjsko, the wider area of Ljubljana, the Coastland and Carinthia (also on the Slovene ethnic territory beyond the Slovenian borders). They were erected for various jubilee occasions by local war veteran organizations together with local communities and associations.

Among partisan monuments, the gravestones, where the bodies of fallen partisans have been transported after the war, are also listed. The data about death are accompanied by the word padel "fallen" or ustreljen "shot". The names of those WW II victims who were executed by partisans accused of the collaboration with the German and Italian occupier and the names of the Slovene soldiers mobilized into the German army, are listed on the parish memorial plaques erected around churches after 1990.

Partisan memorials are frequently recognizable by five-pointed stars; on some gravestones there are both – a star and a cross together. Commemorative plaques are fastened on the native houses of first partisan fighters from 1941, on the houses from where they left into the woods to join the armed resistance, at the places where they were shot, on the graveyards, at town squares or in memorial parks. A number of them are fastened on the façades of factories, fire brigades or municipal buildings. At the ruins of burned homes, in front of illegal partisan hospitals and printing facilities, information boards replace memorial plaques.

Some 4% of all the partisan monuments have been destroyed due to politically motivated vandalism, being stolen and sold to the color metal merchants or because the buildings where they used to be fixed were pulled down. Some have been renewed, some relocated and some deposited into local museums.

== See also ==
- List of World War II monuments and memorials in Slovenia
- List of People's Heroes of Yugoslavia monuments in Slovenia
- Gal Kirn and Robert Burghardt: Yugoslavian Partisan Memorials: Between Memorial Genre, Revolutionary Aesthetics and Ideological Recuperation. Manifesta Journal, 16.

== Gallery ==
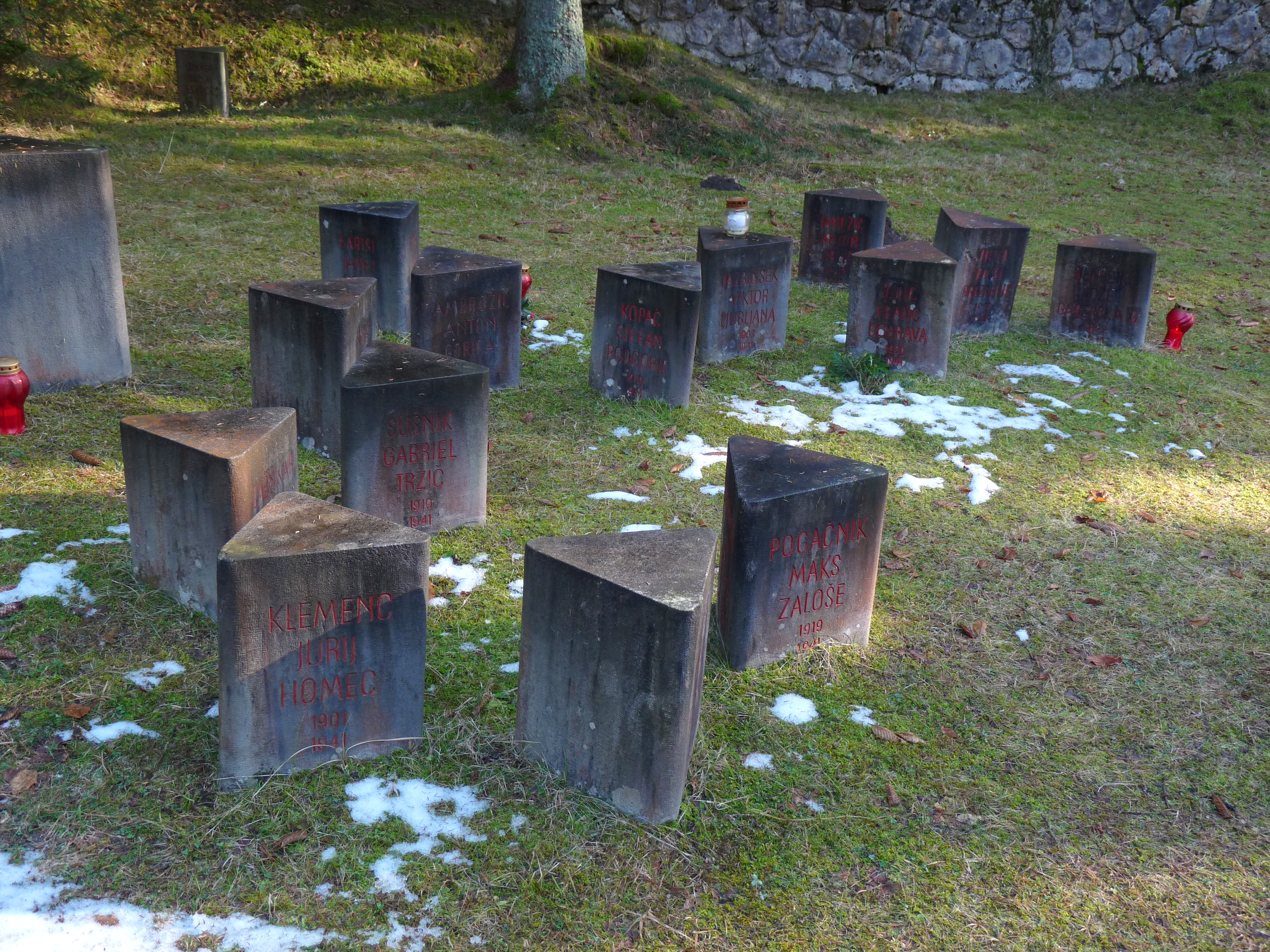

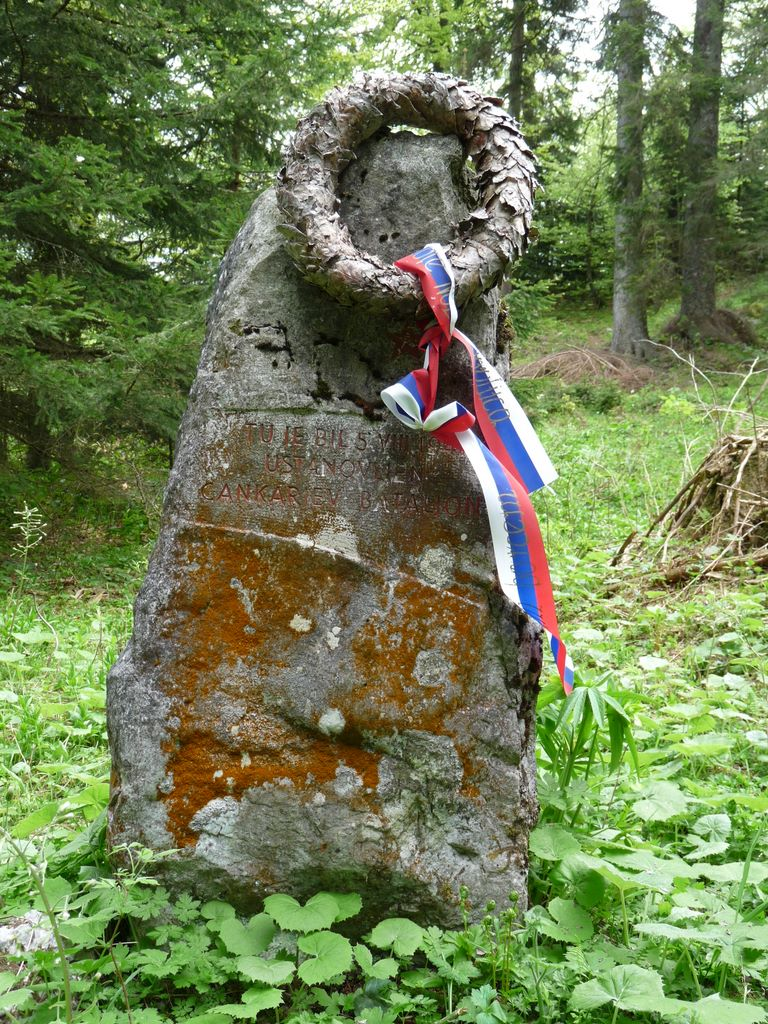

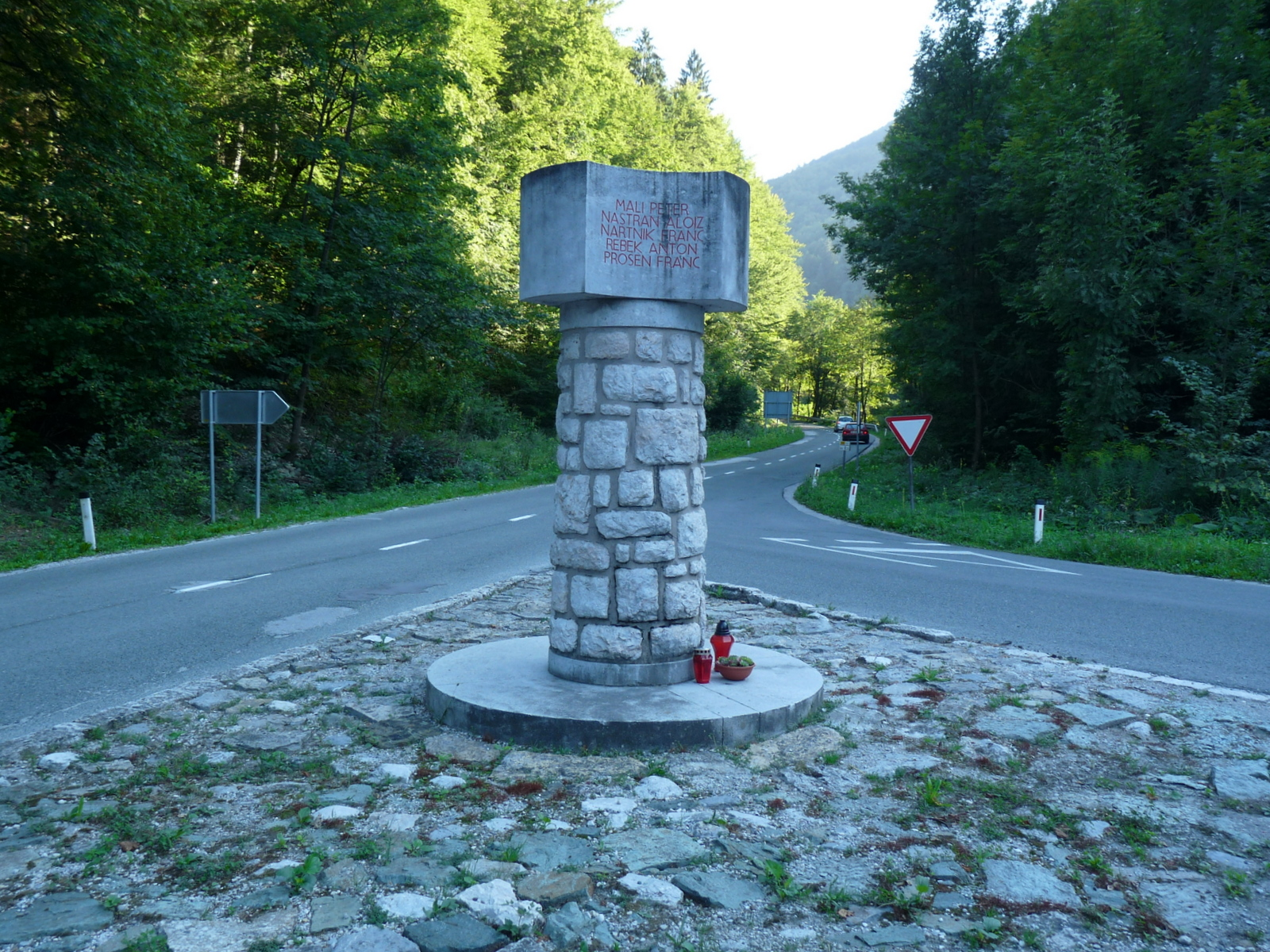

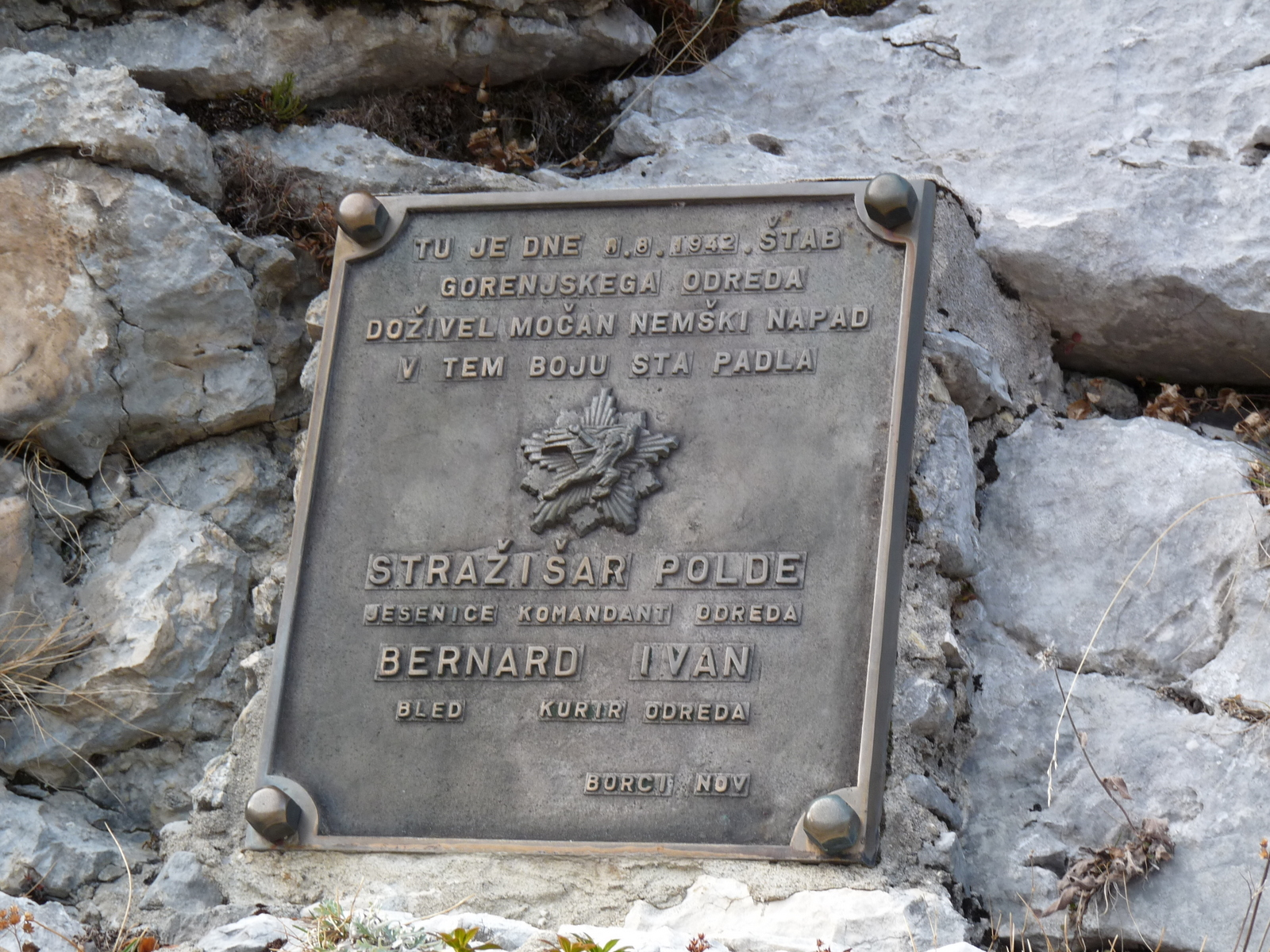

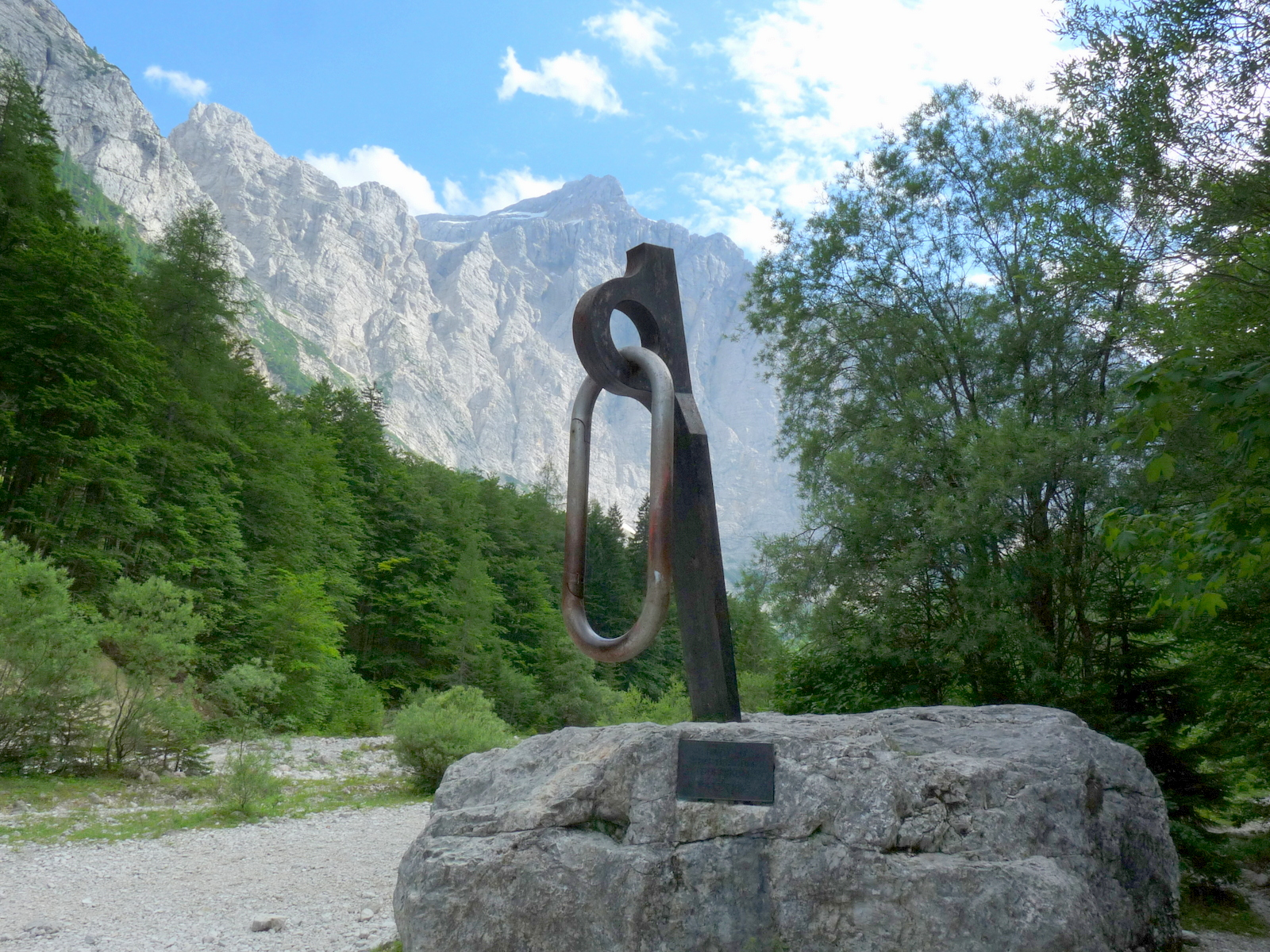

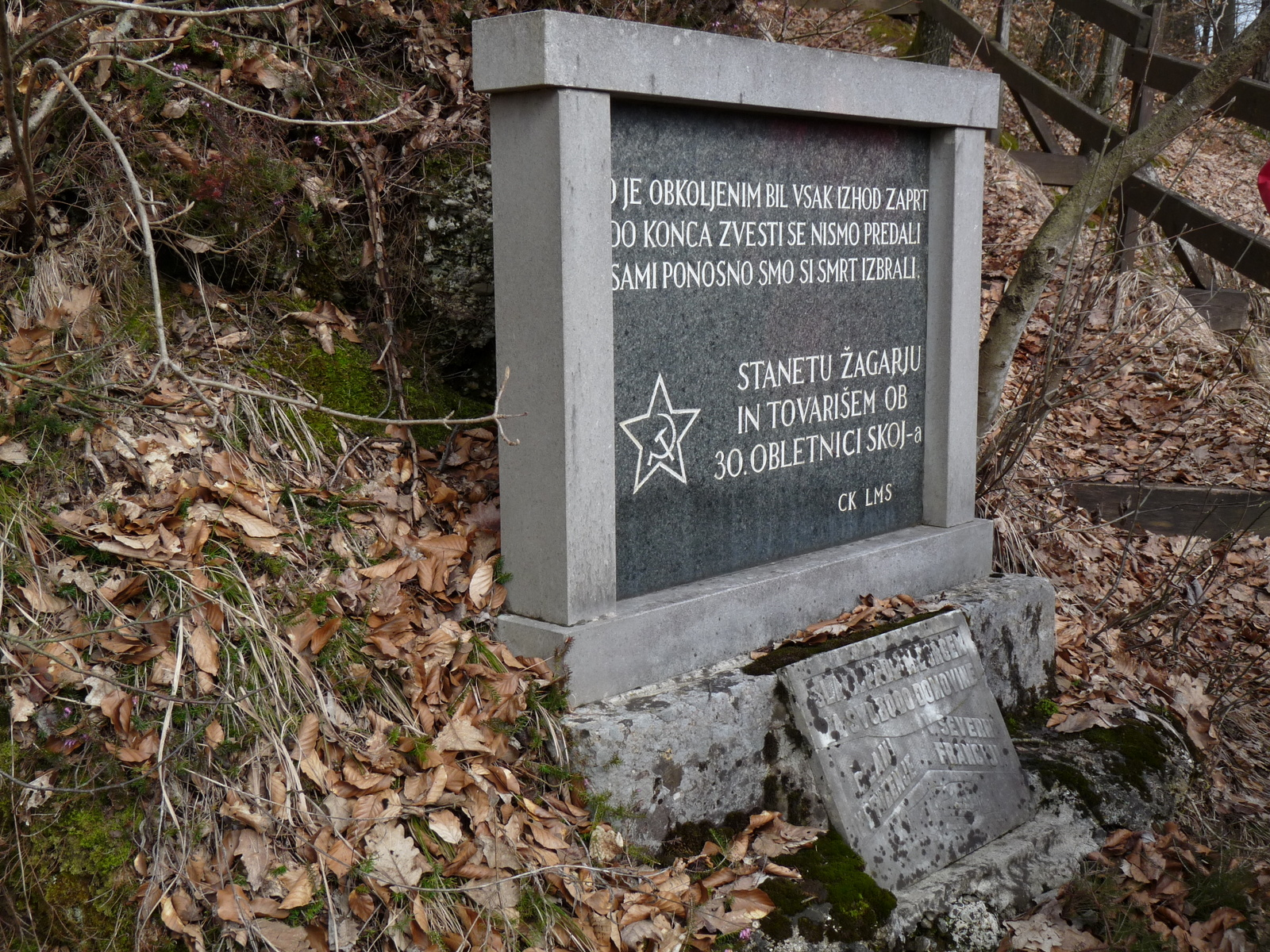

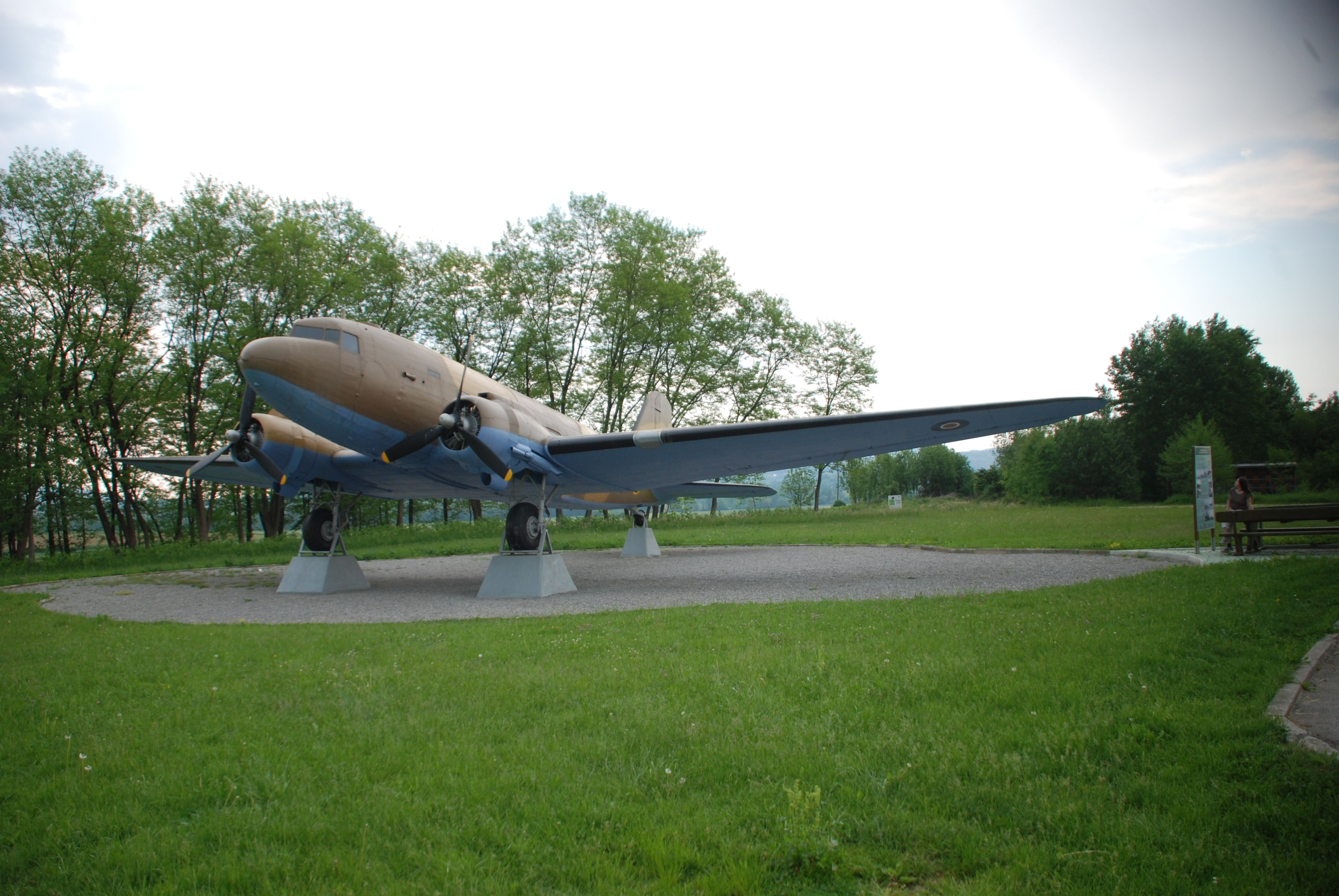
