= Rajka Baković =

Croatian political activist

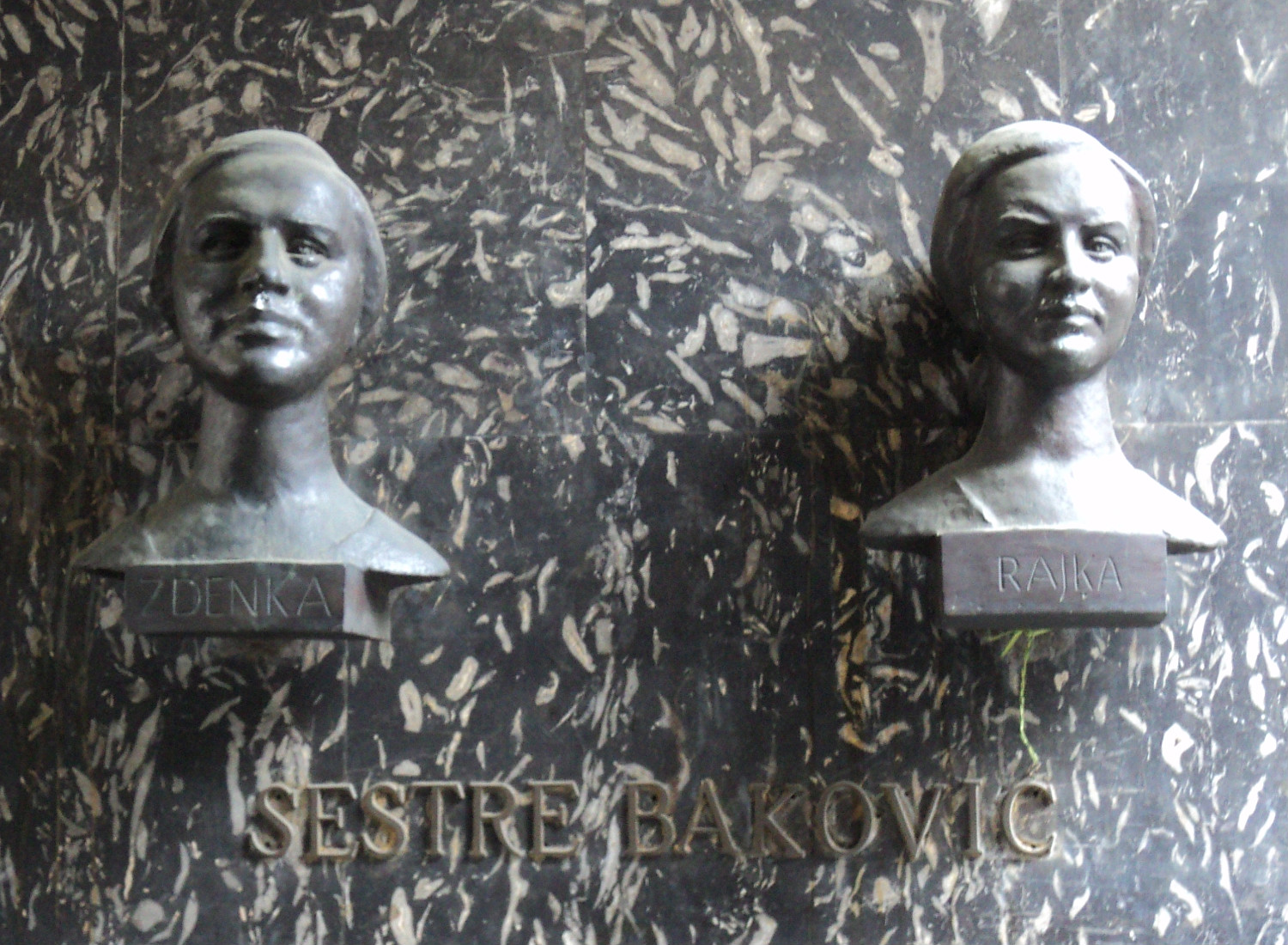
- Busts of Rajka and Zdenka in Passage Of Sisters Baković in Zagreb
- Born: 23 September 1920; Oruro, Bolivia
- Died: 29 December 1941 (aged 21); Zagreb, Independent State of Croatia (now Croatia)
- Occupations: Student, resistance movement member
- Political party: League of Communists of Yugoslavia
- Relatives: Franjo (father); Zdenka (sister); Jerko (brother); Mladen (brother)
- Awards: Order of the People's Hero

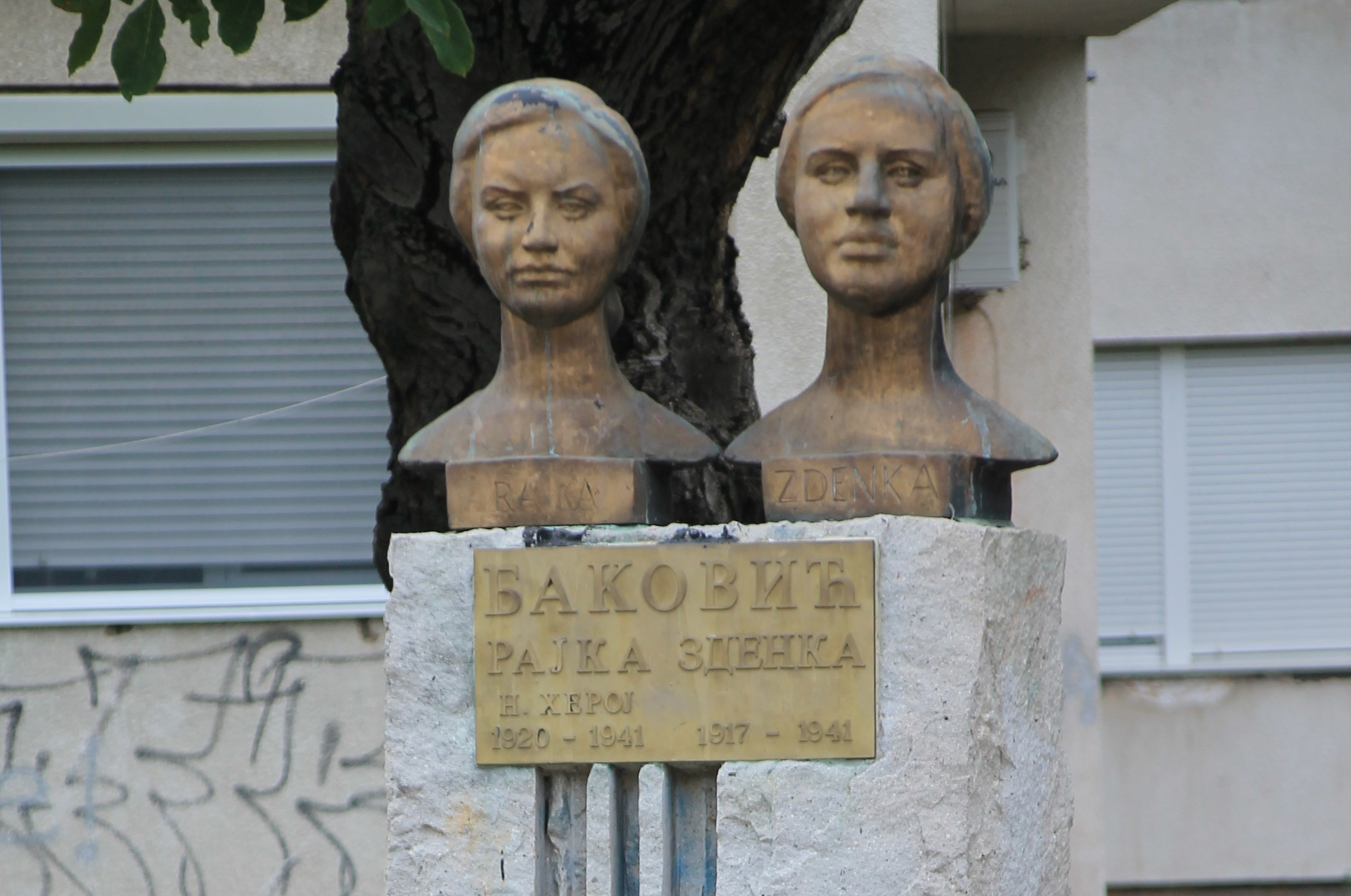
Monument to the Baković sisters in Niš

Rajka Baković (September 2, 1920 – December 29, 1941) was a Croatian student and a member of the anti-fascist resistance movement in the Nazi-puppet state of the Independent State of Croatia (NDH). She and her sister, Zdenka (collectively known as the Baković sisters), used their family newsstand at Nikolićeva Street No. 7 in Zagreb as a hub for connection of members of the resistance at the beginning of World War II.

The Ustasha Surveillance Service (UNS) arrested Rajka and her sister and tortured them for five days. Rajka was taken to the hospital on December 24, 1941, while Zdenka, distraught after finding out Rajka had been taken away, died after throwing herself out of a window. Rajka died on December 29, 1941, as a result of injuries sustained during torture. She was honored as a People's Hero of Yugoslavia.

== Early life and education ==
Rajka Baković was born on September 2, 1920, in the Bolivian mining town of Oruro to a wealthy family of emigrants from the Croatian island of Brač. Her father, Franjo Baković and his brother owned a hotel and shop. The family returned to the Kingdom of Yugoslavia in 1921 for the education of their children Ivo (1915), Zdenka (1918), Jerko (1916), Mladen (1919), and Rajka. After finishing elementary school in Brač, Rajka's family moved to the Croatian capital of Zagreb, where her father bought a three-story building at 25 Gundulićeva Street.

Rajka started showing her left-wing (leftist) orientation during high school by joining the Youth of the League of Communists of Yugoslavia in 1938. Her sister Zdenka, brothers Jerko and Mladen, and mother were also leftists. They were very active in organizations of the labour movements, such as the League of Communists of Yugoslavia and the United Federation of Workers' Unions of Yugoslavia, as well as many other women and student organizations. Rajka soon became known to communists in Zagreb. The building of the Baković family became a gathering place for the left-oriented youth, workers, and intellectuals. After the death of her father Franjo in 1939, the Baković family fell into financial difficulties. They bought a newsstand at 7 Nikolićeva street next to the former cinema that became the Zagreb youth Theatre. In 1941 Rajka enrolled at the Zagreb Faculty of Humanities and Social Sciences, where she studied Romance studies.

After the outbreak of the World War II, the Invasion of Yugoslavia, and consequent establishment of the Nazi puppet state as the Independent State of Croatia in 1941, Rajka was at a risk of being arrested as a prominent leftist so she returned to Brač. An Italian citizen, she could be relatively safe until the end of the war. She eventually went back to Zagreb because she could not stay calm while listening to the news about persecutions of opponents of the regime that were happening there.

== Activities in the resistance movement ==
From the start of the war, the Baković family newsstand was a central hub for the connection of members of the Zagreb resistance movement. They would leave letters or packages to arrange meetings, and it was a place of supply for the League of Communists of Croatia, where Jerko worked. Rajka was a confidential courier of the resistance movement and was responsible for the delivery of mail to Belgrade and other cities. Zdenka participated in actions of the Youth of the League of Communists such as Burning of the Maksimir stadium in 1941. The Baković family's work did not remain unnoticed. After one courier from the Local Committee of the League of Communists in Dalmatia was caught and tortured, he revealed where he was carrying the letters.

== Arrest ==
In the evening of December 20, 1941, agents of the Ustasha Surveillance Service (Croatian: Ustaška nadzorna služba; UNS) broke into the Baković family apartment on Gundulićeva street, searched it, and eventually arrested Zdenka, Rajka and Mladen. Both sisters were subjected to severe torture in order to betray their connections. They were tortured at night and were taken to the newsstand during the day, because the police hoped that they would catch other members of the resistance movement, but that did not happen. Hana Pavelić, a resistance movement member who was responsible for a connection between the League of Communists and the newsstand, noticed that something was wrong in Zdenka and Rajka's behavior so she informed others. Hana Pavelić was soon caught and killed in the Stara Gradiška concentration camp. The sisters did not betray anyone despite severe beatings. When Rajka was brought to the newsstand, after enduring three days of constant beatings, she could not stand anymore. Slavka, the maid of Baković family, asked one of the agents to allow her to take Rajka home so she could at least take a bath. At one point, Rajka managed to pass to her brother, Jerko, a note that read: "May I speak now?" to which Jerko briefly answered: "No."

== Death ==
On December 24, 1941, after five days of torture, Rajka was transported to a hospital. On December 25, Zdenka, in a moment of desperation after seeing that Rajka was not there, broke free from her guards and threw herself from the fourth floor of the UNS headquarters on Zvonimirova street, where she died. Sister Rajka died from her severe injuries on December 29, 1941. There is a record for Zdenka issued by the Institute of Forensic Medicine and Criminology from December 27, 1941, and a record issued by the Pathological Institute of the Hospital of Holy Spirit for Rajka from December 29, 1941. The autopsy report for Rajka states, among other things: "...hematoma in the lower extremities due to beating ..." and "hematoma in the forehead."

== Legacy ==
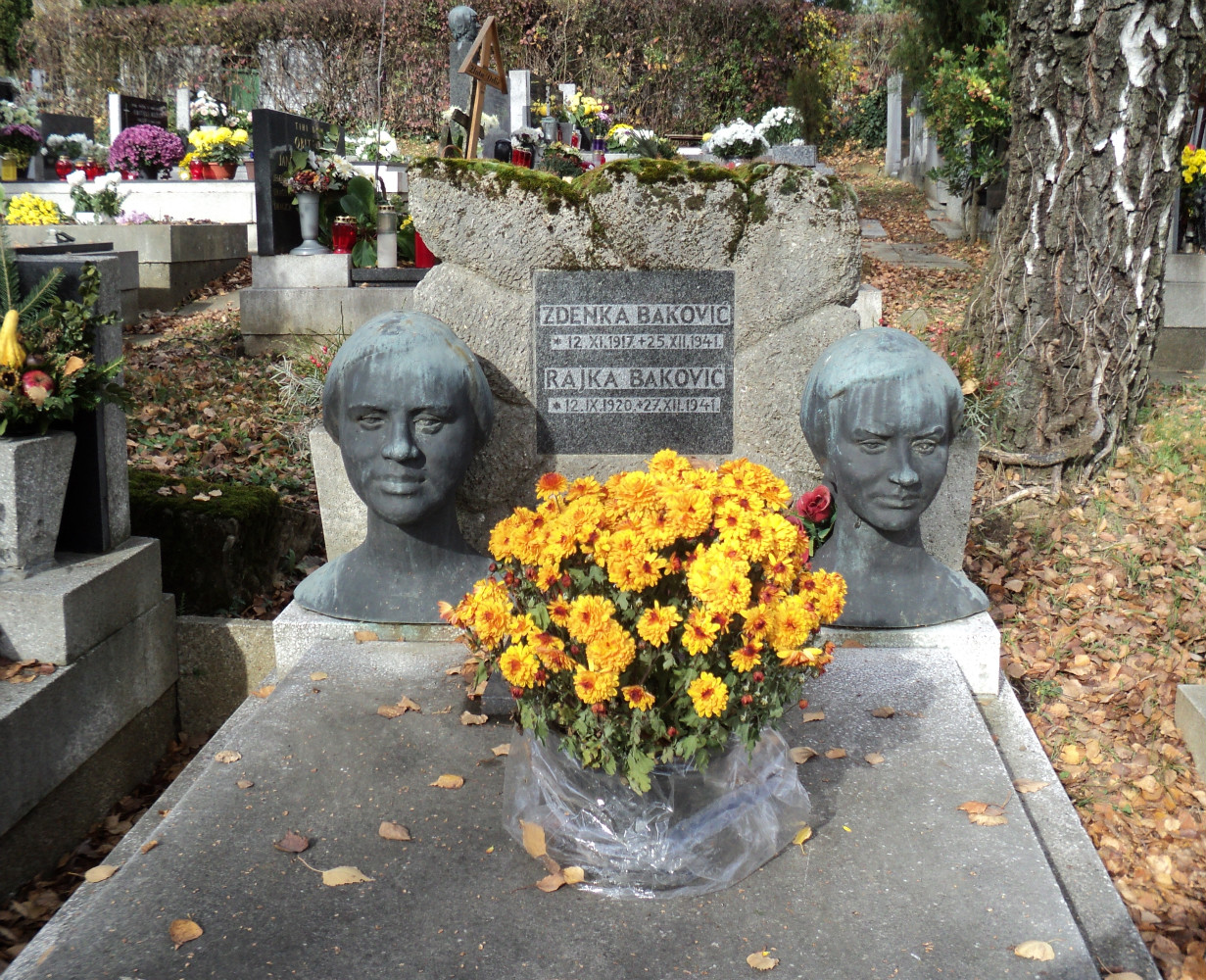
Grave of the Baković sisters

Rajka and Zdenka, known as Sisters Baković, along with Anka Butorac, Ljubica Gerovac, Nada Dimić, Dragica Končar, and Nera Šafarić, were memorialized from 1997 to 2001 by Sanja Iveković's Gen XX project. Sanja created fashion-style magazine ads using popular fashion models but adding the names of forgotten heroines and some information about them.

The city of Zagreb named an alley in Donji grad that connects the Tomaš Masaryk Street and the Warsaw Street the Passage of the Baković Sisters. The busts of the sisters adorn a wall at the entrance, just southwest of the Cvjetni trg. The passage was previously known as the Balkan Passage (Balkan prolaz), the Sisters Baković Passage (Prolaz sestara Baković), Miškec's Passage (Miškecov prolaz), then in 2009 changed back to be named after the sisters Baković.

== See also ==
- List of People's Heroes of Yugoslavia monuments in Croatia
- Zagreb in World War II

== Literature ==
- Narodni heroji Jugoslavije, Mladost Beograd, 1975. godina
- Opća enciklopedija Jugoslavenskog leksikografskog zavoda, Zagreb 1980. godina
