= List of World War II monuments and memorials in Slovenia =

List of World War II monuments and memorials in Slovenia represent Yugoslav monuments and memorials built on the territory of the present day Slovenia.

== History ==
The Yugoslav authorities established several memorial sites between 1945 and 1960, though widespread building started after the founding of the Non-Aligned Movement.

Yugoslav president Josip Broz Tito commissioned several memorial sites and monuments in the 1960s and 70s dedicated to World War II battle, and concentration camp sites. They were designed by notable sculptors, including Dušan Džamonja, Vojin Bakić, Miodrag Živković, Jordan and Iskra Grabul, and architects, including Bogdan Bogdanović, Gradimir Medaković. After Tito's death, a small number was built, and the monuments were popular visitor attractions in the 1980s as patriotic sites, and since the Yugoslav Wars and the dissolution of Yugoslavia, most of the sites are abandoned and have lost their importance.

The list houses monuments and memorials built between 1945 and 1991, and does not include busts or other statues of individuals (see bottom).

| Image | Name | Location | Notes |
|---|---|---|---|
| | Monument to People's liberation struggle of Yugoslavia | Maribor | Designed by Slavko Tihec, built in 1975. |
| | Monument to the Revolution | Ljubljana | Designed by Drago Tršar, built in 1975. |
| | Ilirska Bistrica | Ilirska Bistrica | Dedicated to fallen Slovenian soldiers. Designed by Janez Lenassi, built in 1965. |
| | Monument to fallen fighters | Zreče | |
| | Monument to the Revolution | Kranj | Designed by Lojze Dolinar, built in 1961. |
| | Monument “War and Peace” | Celje, Slovenija | Designed by Jakob Savinšek, built in 1958. |
| | Monument to fallen fighters | Kropa | |
| | Tomb of national heroes | Ljubljana | Designed by Boris Kalin and Edo Mihevc, built in 1949. |
| | Memorial to the battle of Dražgoše | Dražgoše | Designed by Stojan Batič, Boris Kobe and Ive Šubic, built in 1977. Dedicated to fallen fighters and victims of fascism in the battle of Dražgoše. |
| | St. Ulrich Memorial Area | Urh | Designed by the architect Boris Kobe and by the sculptors Karel Putrih and Zdenko Kalin, built in 1955. Dedicated to the Slovene resistance members tortured and killed there. |
| | Monument to fallen fighters | Hrastnik | |
| | Monument to Victims of Fascism | Stranice | |
| | Memorial Cemetery at Kacenštajn Castle | Begunje | Dedicated to civilian hostages killed by fascists. |
| | Monument to the Partisans | Hrastenice | Dedicated to the action of 7 May 1943, when fighters of the partisan battalion attacked the colone of Italian soldiers and destroyed most of the enemy's power. |
| | Monument to the Fallen Fighters and Locals | Zgornja Rečica (hamlet of Igriše) | Dedicated to the attack on the Hribar Farm, which offered hospitality to the Partisans, by the German forces in the night from the 7 to 8 March 1943. Three partisans, three family members and a neighbour were killed. |
| | Monument to the Fallen Fighters | Veliki Korinj | |
| | Monument to Victims of Fascism | Kosler's Thicket (Kozlerjeva gošča) | |
| | Monument to fallen fighters | Krvavec | |
| | Monument to the Liberation Front meeting | Trnovska vas | Dedicated to meeting of members of the Liberation Front of the Slovene People in this place on 24 May 1942. |
| | Monument to Pohorje partisan battalion | Osankarica | Dedicated to fighters of Pohorje Partisan Battalion who were all killed by the German soldiers in 1942. |
| | Monument to victims of fascism | Pugled | Dedicated to wounded partisans who were killed by nazis or left to burn together with the barracks of partisan ambulance on 27 October 1943. |
| | Monument to victims of fascism | Radovna | Dedicated to inhabitants of Radovna village who were all closed by German soldiers into one barrack and left to burn alive on 20 September 1943. |
| | Monument to fallen fighters | Logatec | |
| | Monument to fallen fighters | Lake Peak (Jezerski vrh) | |
| | Monument to fallen fighters | Stara Cerkev | |
| | Monument to fallen fighters | Trnovec | |
| | Monument to fallen fighters | Vipava | |
| | Monument to fallen fighters | Vrhnika | |
| | Monument to fallen fighters and victims of fascism | Dobrava | |
| | Monument to fallen fighters | Javorje Cross (Javorski pil) | |
| | Red army memorial | Murska Sobota | Built in 1945. Dedicated to Red army soldiers who have fallen for the liberation of Međimurje and Prekmurje. |
| | World War II Memorial | Krško | Dedicated to 1941 uprising. |
| | A monument to the victims of the national liberation war | Ljubljana | Monument by Jože Plečnik. |

== See also ==
- Monuments to the Slovene Partisans
- People's Heroes of Yugoslavia monuments
- List of Yugoslav World War II monuments and memorials
- List of World War II monuments and memorials in Bosnia and Herzegovina
- List of World War II monuments and memorials in Croatia
- List of World War II monuments and memorials in Montenegro
- List of World War II monuments and memorials in North Macedonia
- List of World War II monuments and memorials in Serbia
