= Zarečje, Istria County =

Zarečje Sarezzo, Arezzo di Pisino
- Village
- Location within Croatia
- Coordinates: 45.2544355°N 13.9547829°E
- Country: Croatia
- County: Istria County
- Municipality: Pazin

Area
  - Total: 3.1 sq mi (7.9 km^{2})

Population (2021)
  - Total: 294
  - Density: 96/sq mi (37/km^{2})
- Time zone: UTC+1 (CET)
  - Summer (DST): UTC+2 (CEST)
- Postal code: 52000 Pazin
- Area code: 052

Zarečje (Italian: Sarezzo or Arezzo di Pisino) is a village in the municipality of Pazin, Istria in Croatia.

== Demographics ==
According to the 2021 census, its population was 294.

== Notable people ==
- Olga Ban
