= Kadinjača =

Village in Serbia

Coordinates: 43°54′43″N 19°44′32″E

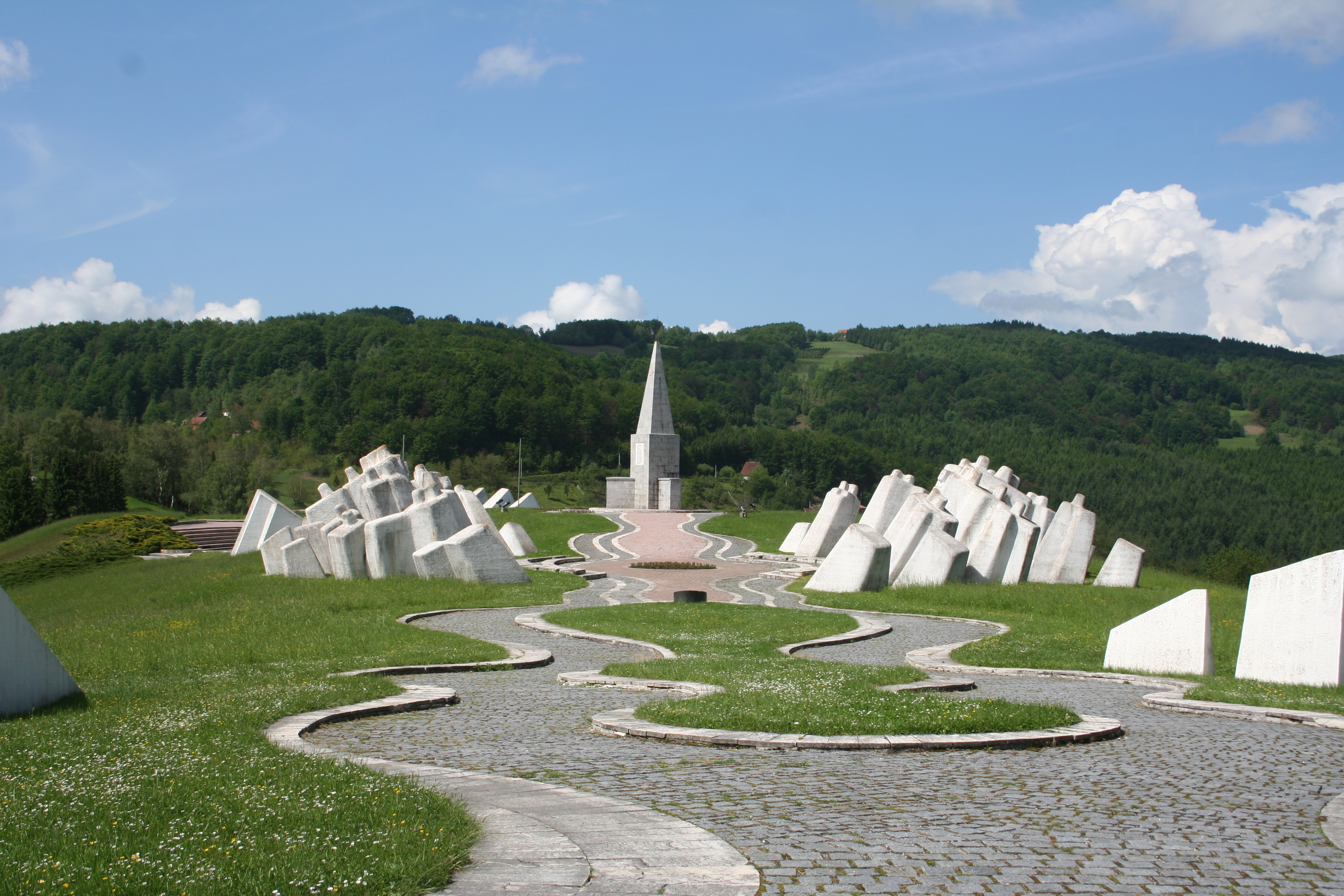
Photo of the Kadinjača monument in western Serbia.

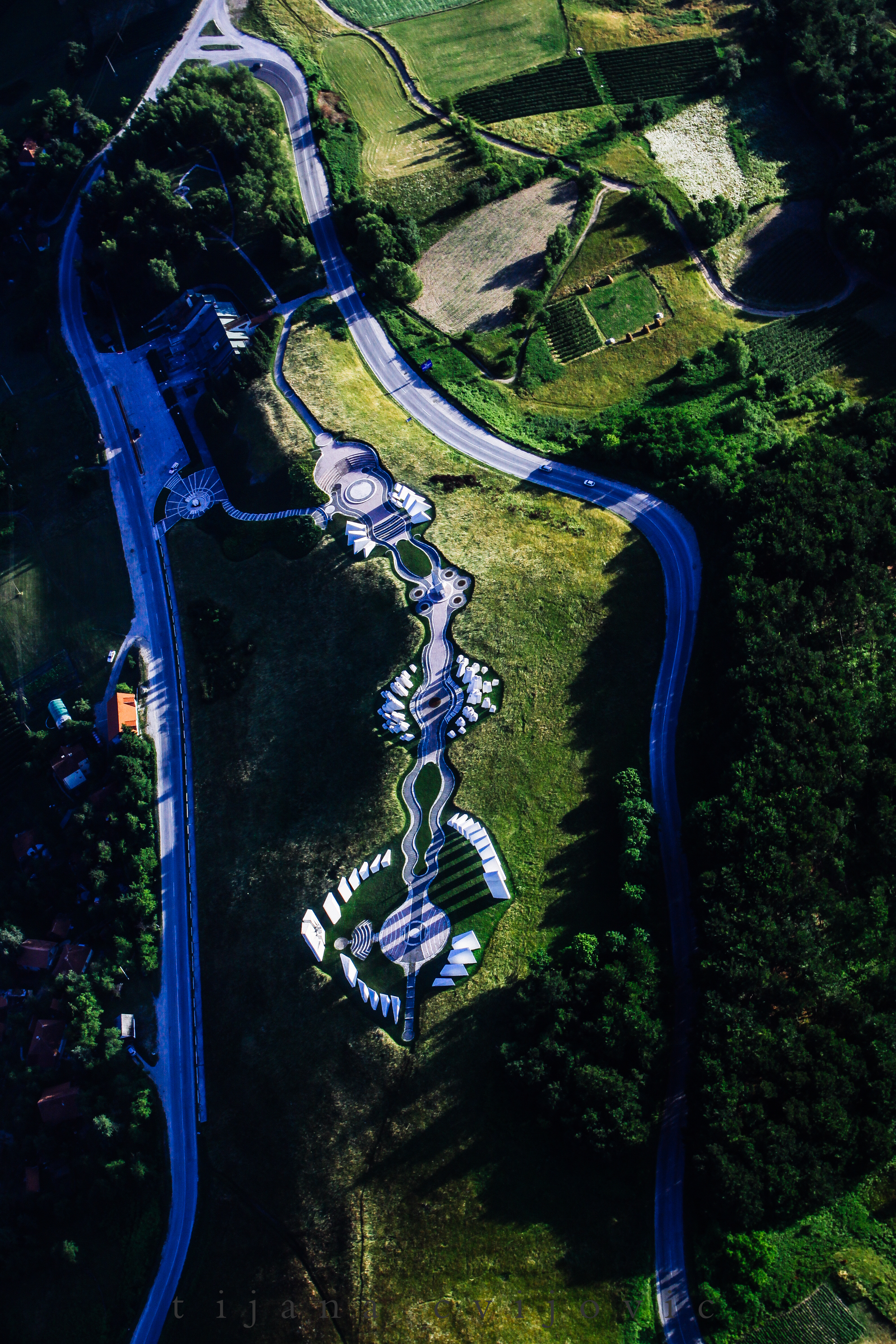
Kadinjača Monument from the air.

Kadinjača is a village, fourteen kilometers from the city of Užice, Serbia, on the route of the highway Užice – Bajina Bašta. It is famous for its memorial of Kadinjača.

Besides the beautiful nature, Kadinjača can boast success in the production of potatoes, raspberries and a good plum brandy. The locals of that region are largely related to the city of Užice in which many employees by companies Užice.

Kadinjača Memorial, which memorializes the 29 November 1941 Battle on Kadinjača during the World War II and the end of the Ужичка Република, Užička Republika, or the Republic of Užice, was declared Monument of Culture of Exceptional Importance in 1979, and it is protected by Republic of Serbia.

== Fighters Workers Battalion Monument on Kadinjača ==
The memorial complex near Užice Kadinjača testifies about the days of the November 1941, when members of the Workers Battalion of Užice Partisan Detachment, which was commanded by Andrija Đurović, provided fierce resistance to far superior German enemy, who at that time carried out offensive against the liberated territory "Republic of Užice". Workers Battalion brave fighters were killed in the battle of Kadinjača on 29 November 1941. German forces broke through the last defense of free Užice, but the heroism of the hero remained remembered in the years that followed.

The memorial is of a complex architectural museal form, comprising the segments built between the years 1952 and 1979. In the first phase (in 1952), the Kadinjača monument was erected under the pyramidal obelisk shape which is the crypt where the remains of members of the Workers' battalion killed during the Battle of Kadinjača lie.

A significant complex expansion took place in 1979, when - based on a project by sculptor Miodrag Živković and architect Aleksandar Đokić - it received its present appearance. The entire memorial complex was officially opened by the President of the SFRJ, Josip Broz Tito, on 23 September 1979.

A special segment of the exhibition complex are over three hundred items and authentic documents, mostly related to members of the Workers Battalion. The issue of personal documents, photographs, archival materials, weapons and other three-dimensional objects.

On the memorial monument verses by Užice poet Slavko Vukosavljević were written:

My Native country, did you know?
There is a whole battalion killed ...
Red blood blossomed
through the snow cover, cold and white.

At night snow overblown that also.
However, in the south, the army is going...
it fell fourteenth kilometers
but never will

Kadinjača.

== Film ==
In 1974, the Yugoslavian film Ужичка Република in Serbian or in English as the Guns of War was released documenting the first offensive in the Great Patriotic War against fascism and follows the Spanish soldier and fervent communist Boro as he organizes a partisan uprising in western Serbia that later establishes itself into the Ужичка Република, Užička Republika, or the Republic of Užice which lasted 67 days from 24 September to 29 November 1941 (de facto until 1 December 1941) and the defeat of its forces at the Battle on Kadinjaca.

== See also ==
- Monument of Culture of Exceptional Importance
- Tourism in Serbia
