= List of Yugoslav World War II monuments and memorials in Montenegro =

List of World War II monuments and memorials in the Montenegro represent Yugoslav monuments and memorials built on the territory of the present day Montenegro.

Image	Name	Location	Notes
	Monument to the partisan soldier	Podgorica	Designed by Drago Đurović and Vojislav Đokić, built in 1957. Dedicated to 97 People's heroes of Montenegro
	Partisan graveyard in Breza	Breza	Designed by Momčilo Vujisić, built in 1974. Dedicated to fallen fighters of the Yugoslav Front.
	Monument to Freedom	Berane	Designed by Bogdan Bogdanović, and opened in 1977. Located on Jasikovac hill, on the outskirts of the town.
	Partisan graveyard in Podbišće	Podbišće	Dedicated to fallen fighters of the Yugoslav Front.
	Memorial graveyard in Cijevna	Cijevna	Dedicated to fallen fighters of the Yugoslav Front.
	Memorial park to the Uprising and the Revolution	Grahovo	Designed by Miodrag Živković, built in 1978. Dedicated to fallen fighters of the Yugoslav Front.
	Monument to fallen fighters	Bijelo Polje	Dedicated to fallen fighters of the Yugoslav Front.
	Monument to fallen fighters	Brajići	Designed by Stevan Luketić, dedicated to fallen fighters of the 1875-1918 liberation wars and the Yugoslav Front.
	Monument to fallen fighters	Brskut	Dedicated to fallen fighters of the Balkan Wars and the Yugoslav Front.
	Monument to fallen fighters	Godinje	Dedicated to fallen fighters of the Yugoslav Front.
	Monument to fallen fighters	Danilovgrad	Designed by Drago Đurović and Mirko Đokić. Dedicated to fallen fighters of the Yugoslav Front.
	Monument to fallen fighters	Kolašin	Designed by Vojin Bakić, built in 1949. Dedicated to fallen fighters of the Yugoslav Front.
	Monument to the Revolution	Virpazar	Designed by Mirko Ostoja. Dedicated to fallen fighters of the Yugoslav Front.
	Monument to fallen patriots	Nikšić	Designed by Bogdan Bogdanović. Dedicated to 32 anti-fascists and patriots shot by the occupiers on Trebjesa hill
	Memorial to the liberation of Herceg Novi	Herceg Novi	
	Monument to the People's Hero of Yugoslavia Nikola Đurković in Herceg Novi.	Herceg Novi	
	Monument for heroes fallen for freedom	Kotor	

== See also ==
- People's Heroes of Yugoslavia monuments
- List of Yugoslav World War II monuments and memorials
- List of World War II monuments and memorials in Bosnia and Herzegovina
- List of World War II monuments and memorials in Croatia
- List of World War II monuments and memorials in North Macedonia
- List of World War II monuments and memorials in Serbia
- List of World War II monuments and memorials in Slovenia
