= Olga Ban =

Yugoslav partisan

- Born: 29 June 1926 (Note: While most sources note 29 June 1926 as date of birth, some others note 26 June 1926 or 1925.); Zarečje, Kingdom of Italy
- Died: 8 October 1943 (aged 17) (Note: While most sources note 8 October 1943 as date of death, some others note 7 or 8 October 1943.); Pazin
- Years active: 1941–1943
- Known for: Resistance against Nazi occupation
- Father: Mate Ban
- Awards: People's Hero of Yugoslavia (posthumously, 1973)

Olga Ban (29 June 1926 – 8 October 1943) was a Croatian partisan. She was part of the resistance against Axis forces in World War II until Nazis executed her father and her in 1943. She was posthumously declared a People's Hero of Yugoslavia in 1973.

== Early life ==
Olga Ban was born on 29 June 1926 to Mate Ban and Ana Dušan in Zarečje, near Pazin, Istria, then under the administration of the Kingdom of Italy. After Olga finished elementary school, she started helping his father at work as a tailor. Mate Ban was involved in the progressive publication Edinost from Trieste.

== Resistance and execution ==
As World War II escalated, in 1941, Ban's family home became a hub for the local partisans of the National Liberation Movement in Croatia (NOP) in their resistance against the Axis powers. Ban joined the League of Communist Youth of Yugoslavia (SKOJ) in February 1942 and participated in partisan activities, sewing clothes or performing courier duties. On 16 June 1943, Ban and her father were admitted to the Communist Party of Yugoslavia in a partisan base in Brgudac.

The Carabinieri arrested her mother Ana and brother Antun and imprisoned them in the Coroneo prison in Trieste. They were released after the Armistice of Cassibile in September 1943. On 10 September 1943, Ban returned to Istria to conduct youth organization.

During the German offensive, on 6 October 1943, Nazi forces arrested and imprisoned her in the Pazin Castle, and then executed Olga, her father Mate, and several other Istrians in the Pazin cemetery. Her mother and brother were deported to the Dachau concentration camp.

== Legacy ==
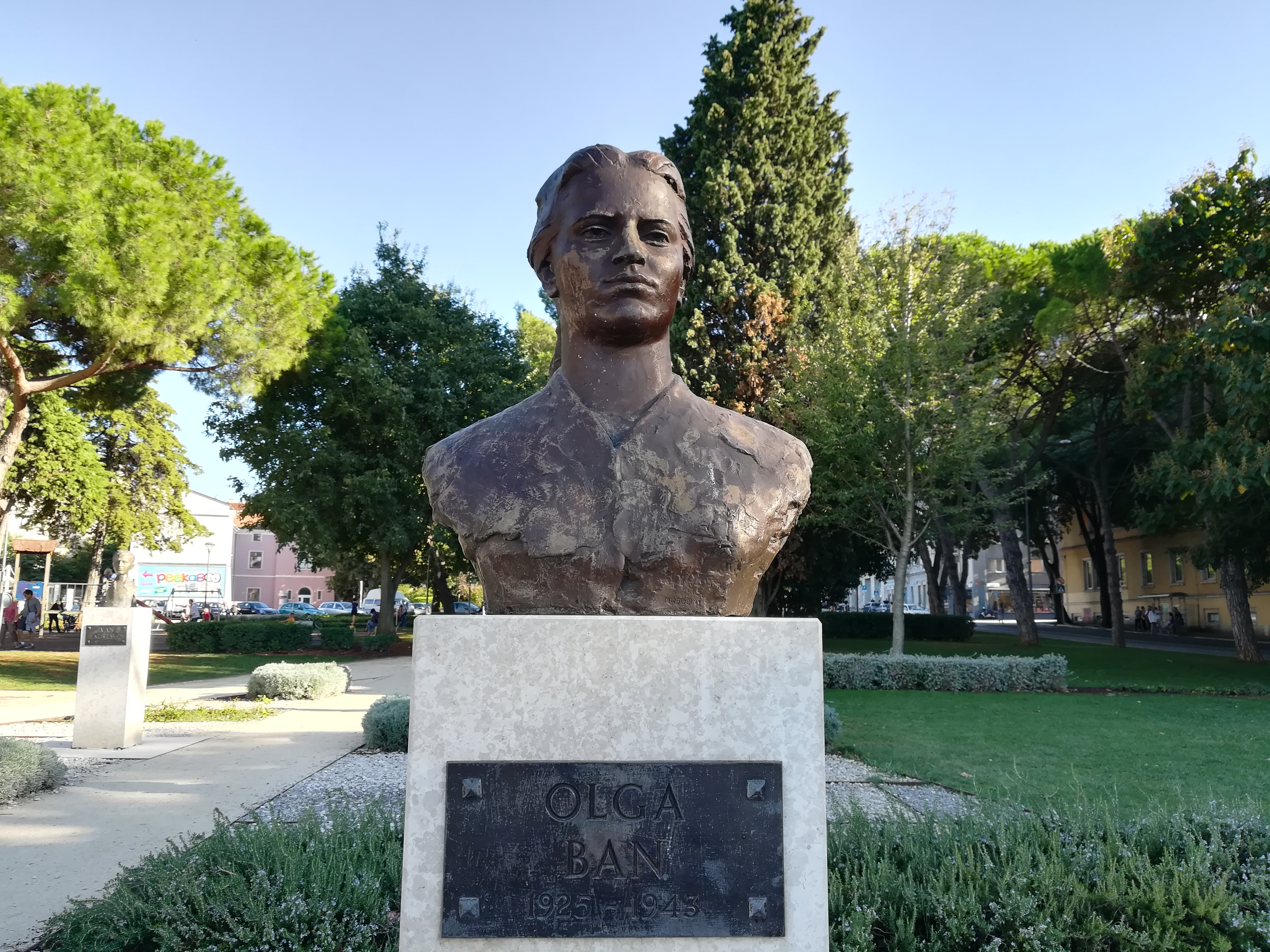
Olga Ban memorial in Titov park in Pula.

In 1973, Olga Ban was posthumously declared a People's Hero of Yugoslavia by President Josip Broz Tito.
