= Joakim Rakovac =

Antifascist partisan and national hero of Yugoslavia (1914–1945)

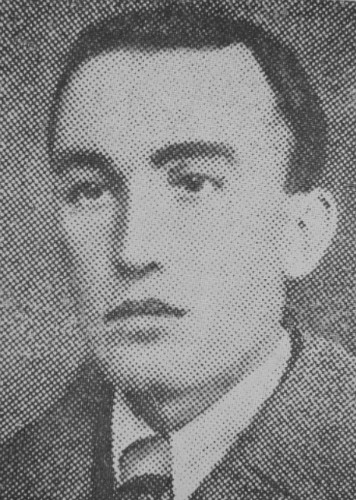
- Born: 14 November 1914; Rakovci, Croatia, near Poreč, Istria
- Died: 18 January 1945 (aged 30)
- Known for: Yugoslav resistance fighter

Joakim Rakovac (14 November 1914 – 18 January 1945) was an Istrian anti-fascist, partisan and national hero of Yugoslavia. The circumstances of his death and the identity of his murderers are debated, and he is thought by some to have been murdered by the Yugoslav partisans.

== Life ==
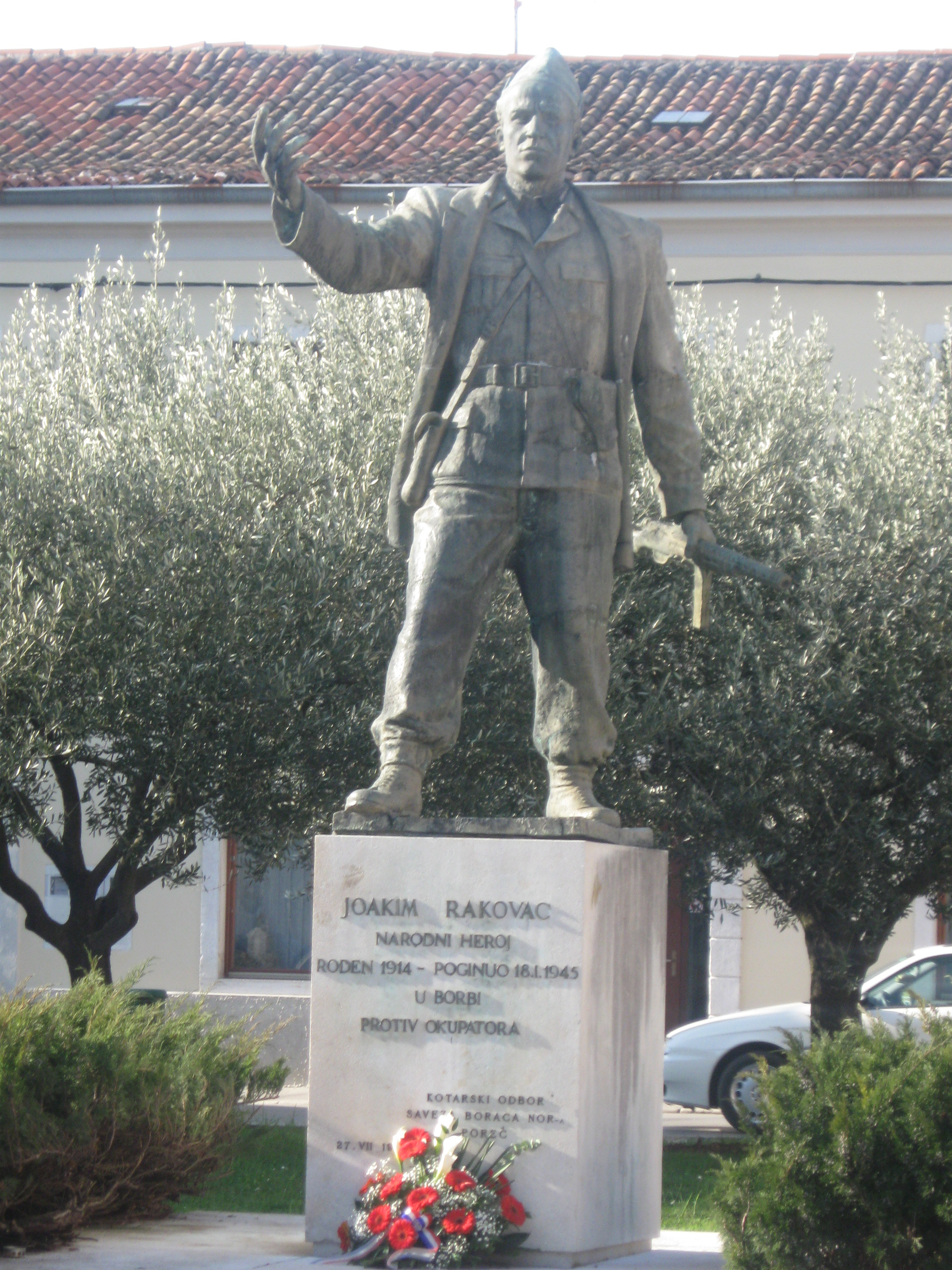
Monument to Joakim Rakovac in Poreč

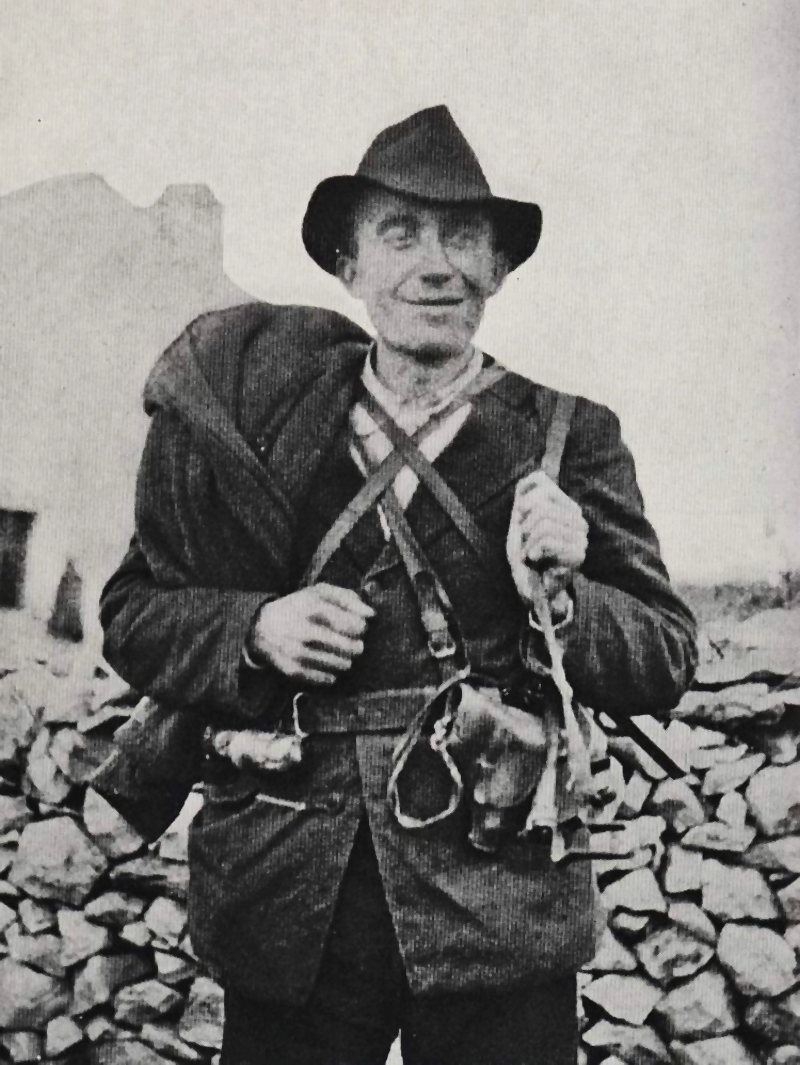
Contemporaries remembered Joakim Rakovac wearing a hat; later artistic depictions portrayed him with a titovka, in order to make him closer to the typical Yugoslav partisan and bring him closer to mainstream Yugoslav culture

Joakim Rakovac was born in the village of Rakovci, Croatia (Rahovci) about ten kilometers from Poreč. He finished Italian primary school, but at the urging of his parents he also read books in Croatian, which was banned by the Italianization policy. His father Ivan was beaten by the fascists on multiple occasions and imprisoned by the Italian authorities; he eventually died in the Nazi concentration camp of Dachau.

By the time of the beginning of World War II and the invasion of Yugoslavia, Rakovac had become a member of the Italian army, but was considered "politically suspicious". As early as 1942, he returned to Istria. Some sources claim that he deserted the Italian army, others that he was deposed.

Upon returning to Istria, he was introduced to anti-fascism and began associating with the Croatian anti-fascist movement, establishing close cooperation with the populist Jože Šuran, who was already in contact with partisans from other parts of Croatia. He was part of a group of 18 people who, following orders from Jože Šuran, met on December 15, 1942 in Poreč (near a pond in the village of Rapavel). There was present communist activist Ante Drndić Stip, who was sent by the Communist Party of Croatia to organize a partisan movement in Istria. At the end of 1942, he gathered thirty people in his house in the village of Rakovci, and discussed with them the possibility of fighting fascism; he later established the national liberation committee (NOC) in that same place.

In the summer of 1943, he led a first large group of Istrians towards Gorski Kotar to join the partisans. In August 1943, he became the president of the NOC of Istria. After the capitulation of Italy on September 8, 1943, he took part in the disarmament of the garrisons in Cerovlje and nearby Borut. The news of the capitulation reached him while he was leading a large group of volunteers to the partisans in Gorski Kotar. He then took part in the liberation of Pazin, and on September 14 he entered Poreč with a small group of partisans, but nonetheless succeeded in taking power. As the chairman of the Provincial People's Liberation Committee for Istria, he participated in the historic Pazin Decisions whereby Istria seceded from Italy and united with Yugoslavian Croatia.

After the German occupation of Istria, he worked tirelessly on the field, visiting Istrian villages, encouraging people to revolt and organizing anti-fascist volunteers, all with the aim of liberating Istria. It is not reported that he preached communist ideology, although it is unanimously reported that he joined the Communist Party and that he was a member of the party's leadership for Istria.

In the second edition of the Glas Istre of September 1943, the first newspaper article ever written by Joakim Rakovac was published. The article for the partisan press was written in July 1943, before the September uprising in Istria, when Rakovac was leading about a hundred Istrian volunteers to the partisans in Gorski Kotar. The article (probably with much editorial work; Rakovac only went to Italian school and had never had the opportunity to write in Croatian before), published under the title "Sretni i ponosni pošli smo u našu vojsku" (Happy and Proud We Went to Our Army), describes the preparation for joining the partisans; the text shows the circumstances in which Rakovac moved:

Tog dana žene su marljivo pripremale hranu i robu za put a ljudi su obustavili svaki posao koji nije bio u vezi s mobilizacijom. Oni koji su radili u ugljenokopu napustili su rad. Seljaci su objesili svoje kose, kosire i motike. Svuda su odjekivale borbene pjesme. Trebalo je vidjeti silno oduševljenje i radost, koja se na licima sviju čitala. U nekim selima nije bilo ni čovjeka, ni žene, ni odraslog djeteta, koje nije znalo za pripreme i odlazak u NOV. Na sam dan odlaska bilo je već sve spremno. Postavljene su straže po svim putovima, gdje je bilo opasno, da bi provalili banditi i pomrsili naš plan. Posjedali smo na travu oko punih zdjela, koje su za svoje borce donijele njihove drugarice. Uprtismo ruksake i rastadosmo se. Stariji i mlađi drugovi, koji su još ostali, klicali su nam i obećavali da će doskora i oni za nama. Otrgnuvši se iz zagrljaja majki i žena, krenuli smo odlučnim korakom. Kudgod smo prolazili, ljudi su nas toplo pozdravljali i nudili jelom, pićem i voćem. A sada već u slobodi, odmarajući se u gustoj jelovoj šumi, sjećamo se rastanka i suznih očiju majki, sestara i žena, koje smo tamo, kraj mora ostavili. Ali, mi im sada dovikujemo: »Ne plačite, ne plačite za nama! Mi smo otišli putem časne borbe. Mi smo se odazvali pozivu druga Tita. Ne oplakujte istarske žene i majke sretne vojnike, koji će se vratiti preko Učke, goneći ispred sebe crni fašistički mrak i donoseći toplo sunce slobode! Oplakujte radije one jadnike, koji su otišli u fašističku Italiju da ginu za naše najveće neprijatelje. Oplakujte i one koji još čekaju, i koje neprijatelj hvata i trpa u svoje kamione. Kažite vašim drugovima da ne kolebaju, neka ni časa ne čekaju, već neka idu za nama dok je još vrijeme. Upamtite, da se neće spasiti onaj koji želi u ovom najodlučnijem času ostati po strani. Stotine je takvih već propalo. Sloboda se ne kupuje na sajmu, a niti se ne daruje. Nju ćemo samo puškom i borbom postići. (On that day, women diligently prepared food and goods for the trip and men suspended any work that was not related to mobilization. Those who worked in the coal mine moved out of it. The villagers hung their billhooks, scythes and hoes. Battle songs resounded everywhere. It was necessary to see the great enthusiasm and joy, which could be read on everyone's face. In some villages, there was no man, no woman, no adult child, who did not know about the preparations to go and join the NOV. On the day of departure, everything was ready. Guards were set up along the roads, where it was dangerous, where it was needed. We sat on the grass around full dishes, brought for the fighters by their comrades. We packed our backpacks and parted. Older and younger comrades, who remained, cheered for us and promised that they would follow us soon. Breaking away from the embrace of mothers and wives, we took a decisive step. Everywhere we passed, people greeted us warmly and offered us meals, drinks and fruit. And now already in freedom, resting in the dense fir forest, we remember the parting, and the wet eyes of mothers, sisters and brides, whom we left there, by the sea. But we are now shouting to them, “Don’t cry, don’t cry for us!" We went through an honorable fight. We responded to Comrade Tito's call. Do not mourn the Istrian women and mothers of the happy soldiers, who will return across Učka, chasing the black fascist darkness in front of them and bringing the warm sun of freedom! Rather mourn those poor people who went to fascist Italy to die for our greatest enemies. Mourn those who are still waiting, and whom the enemy catches and puts in their trucks. Tell your friends not to hesitate, don't let them wait, but let them follow us while there is still time. Remember, the one who wants to stay aside at this most decisive hour will not be saved. Hundreds of them have already failed. Freedom is not bought, nor is it donated. We will only achieve it with a rifle, and a fight).

As a councilor, he participated to the multi-party Third Session of ZAVNOH in May 1944.

During the NOC meeting in the village of Korenići above Limska draga, Rakovac and his comrades were ambushed by the Germans, and everyone was forced to flee to their side; Rakovac was hit by a dum-dum bullet, but managed to escape to a nearby forest where he bled to death. He was found the next day, dead in the snow - at least this is the version of events that Rakovac's comrades-in-arms repeated for decades on official occasions. The identity of Rakovac's killers remains debated to this day.

The remains of Joakim Rakovac are today in Poreč, under a statue erected in his honor in the square named after him. Numerous stories on several topics are connected with his death, from the fact that someone betrayed him from within the ranks of the partisans, to the fact that the Germans had a spy. His tireless work of raising the people to revolt, his commitment to the equality of Croats and Italians in Istria, his immense energy and dedication to work, made Joakim Rakovac a legend even during his lifetime. Today, almost every town in Istria (and Gorski kotar) has a street or a square dedicated to him.
