= Veselin Masleša =

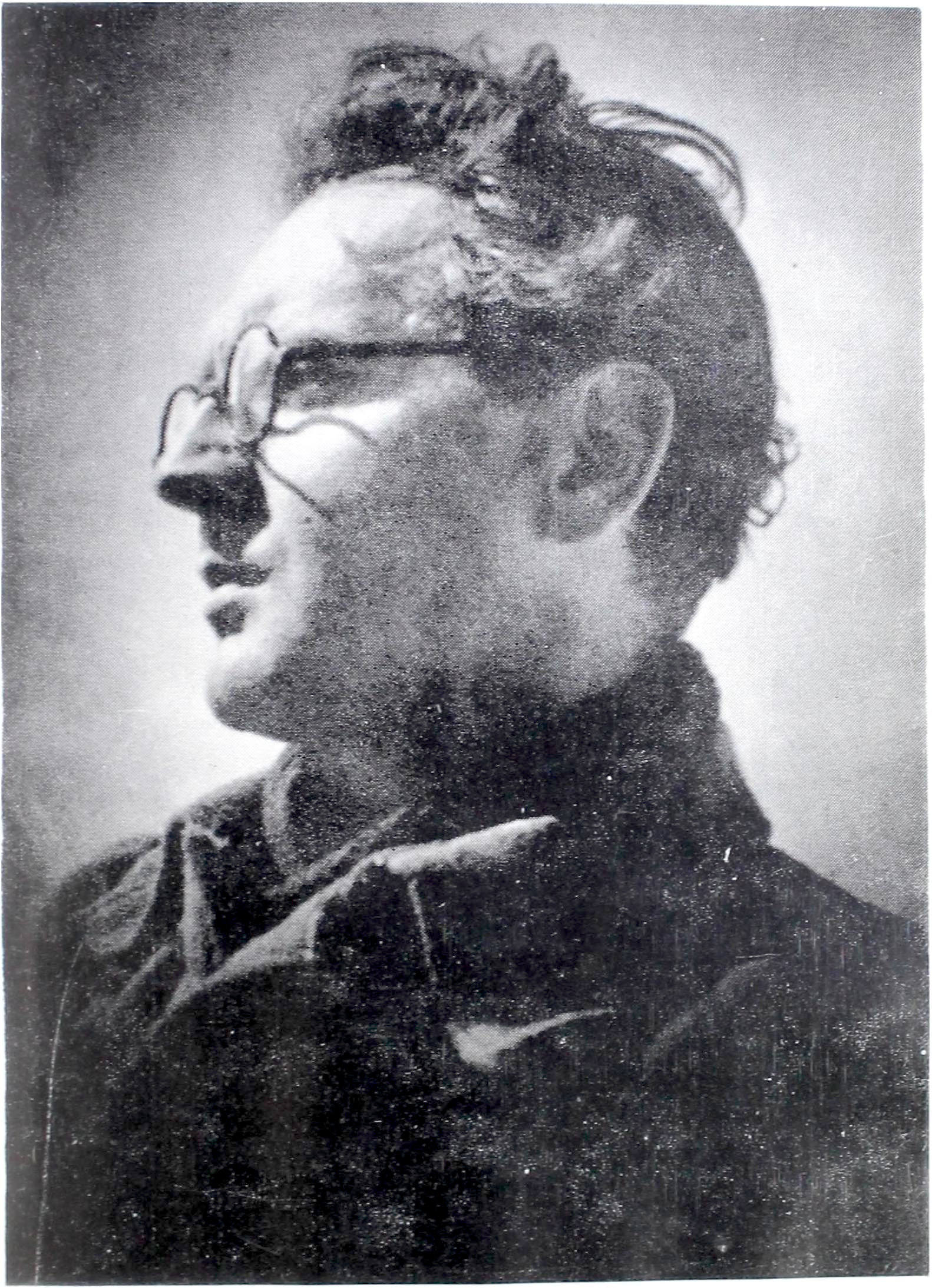
- Born: 20 April 1906; Banja Luka, Condominium of Bosnia and Herzegovina, Austro-Hungarian Empire
- Died: 14 June 1943 (aged 37) near the Sutjeska river, Bosnia and Herzegovina

Veselin Masleša (Serbian Cyrillic: Веселин Маслеша; 20 April 1906 – 14 June 1943) was a Bosnian and Yugoslav writer, activist and Partisan.

Veselin Masleša was born to a Bosnian Serb family in Banja Luka, Bosnia and Herzegovina, then occupied by Austria-Hungary, where he finished grade school and gymnasium. He then studied law at the University of Zagreb, economics in Frankfurt and then political economy and sociology in Paris.

His first published work was in the magazine Nova literatura in 1928, and he also published in the magazines Književnik, Stožer, Danas and Naša stvarnost. He wrote two large studies called Mlada Bosna and Svetozar Marković which were published later in 1945.

In 1927 he was arrested for the first time due to his communist ideas. Between 1928 and 1939 he was arrested and released on several occasions, eventually causing him to go underground. When World War II started in Yugoslavia in 1941, he was in Montenegro where he joined the Partisans. Masleša died during the attempted breakout through enemy lines during the Axis Operation Schwarz offensive in the summer of 1943.

On December 20, 1951 he was posthumously awarded the title of People's Hero of Yugoslavia. There was a Sarajevo-based publishing house named after him but the name was later changed to Sarajevo Publishing, and the Socialist Republic of Bosnia and Herzegovina's scientific achievement award was also named after him.
