= Memorial Park "Uprising and Revolution" =

- Interactive map of Memorial Park "Uprising and Revolution"
- Coordinates: 42°39′03″N 18°40′20″E
- Designer: Miodrag Živković
- Beginning date: 1977
- Completion date: 1978
- Dedicated to: Yugoslav Partisans; Sava Kovačević

The Memorial Park "Uprising and Revolution" (Serbo-Croatian: Spomen-park Ustanka i Revolucije) is a memorial park near Umac, Grahovo, Montenegro. The complex was built from 1977 to 1978.

== Description ==
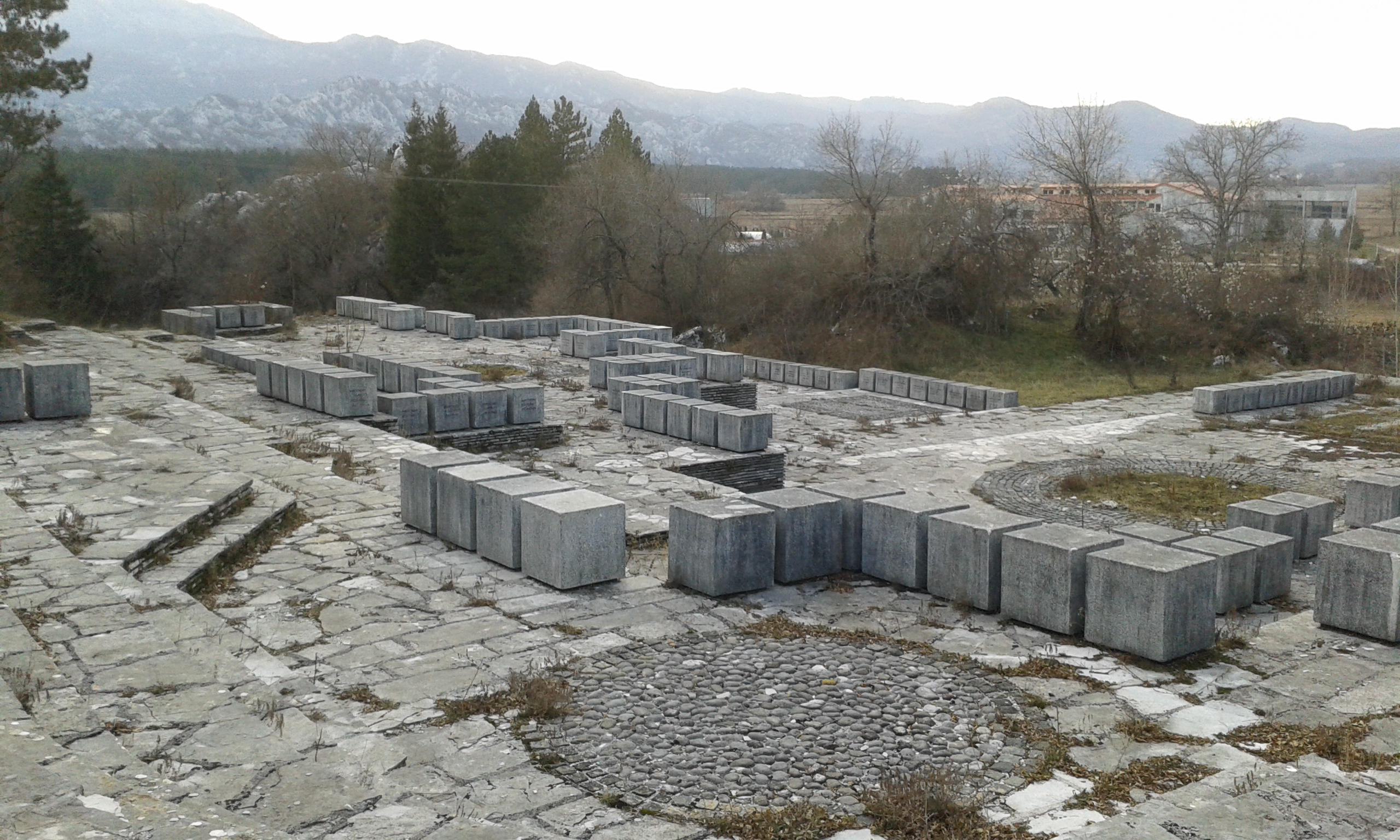
Name stones, the Memory Park of the Uprising and Revolution, Grahovo, Montenegro. Photography by Carna Brkovic.

The central building inside the memorial park is a figural sculptural composition in the form of a moving column, headed by a figure of Sava Kovačević. The composition is made of bronze and is 7 meters high. Its author is the sculptor Miodrag Živković. People's hero Sava Kovačević was born in the nearby village of Nudo, and on July 13, 1941, he led the Grahovo partisans in this attack on the occupying forces and disarmed the enemy column.

The broader spatial concept contains sculptural elements, i.e. 272 cubes on which the names of fallen Partisan fighters from that area are inscribed, approaches, plateaus, and staircases made of stone.
