= Veliki Korinj =

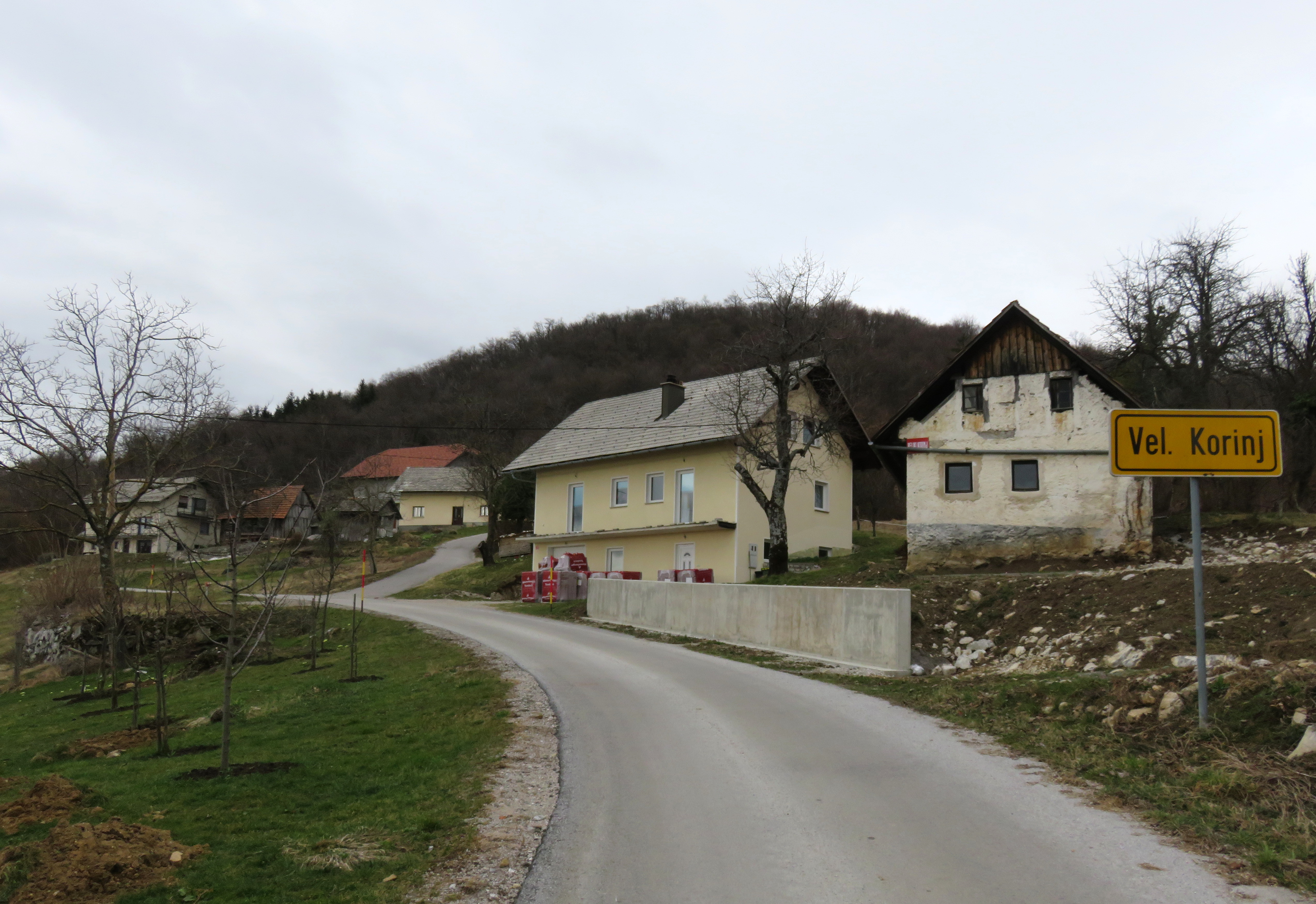

- Location in Slovenia
- Coordinates: 45°50′33.33″N 14°46′42.78″E
- Country: Slovenia
- Traditional region: Lower Carniola
- Statistical region: Central Slovenia
- Municipality: Ivančna Gorica

Area
  - Total: 7.1 km^{2} (2.7 sq mi)
- Elevation: 600.3 m (1,969 ft)

Population (2002)
  - Total: 40

Veliki Korinj (pronounced [ˈʋeːliki ˈkɔːɾin]) is a village in the hills south of Krka in the Municipality of Ivančna Gorica in central Slovenia. The municipality is part of the traditional region of Lower Carniola and is now included in the Central Slovenia Statistical Region.

Archaeological evidence from a site in the village shows Eneolithic settlement in the area.
