= Miodrag Živković (sculptor) =

Serbian sculptor (1928–2020)

Miodrag Živković Миодраг Живковић
- Photo of Živković in front of one of his sculptures
- Born: 1 February 1928; Leskovac, Kingdom of Yugoslavia
- Died: 31 July 2020 (aged 92); Belgrade, Serbia
- Education: Academy of Applied Arts
- Known for: Sculpture
- Notable work: Tjentište; The Interrupted Flight; Kadinjača Memorial Complex

Miodrag Živković (Serbian Cyrillic: Миодраг Живковић; 1928 – 31 July 2020) was a Serbian sculptor and university professor. He is well-known for his work on memorial complexes throughout Yugoslavia.

== Biography ==
Živković was born in Leskovac. After moving to Belgrade with his family in 1944, he graduated from the Academy of Applied Arts in Belgrade in 1952. After working as an arts teaching instructor in Mladenovac and Novi Beograd, he was employed as an assistant professor at the Faculty of Applied Arts within the University of Arts in Belgrade, becoming Dean in 1974, a position he occupied until 1977. From 1977 to 1984 he was head of the Faculty's sculpture department. From 1991 to 1996 he was again Dean of the Faculty.

He died in Belgrade on 31 July 2020.

== Works ==
Outside of academia, Živković is known as the creator of a number of sculptures throughout the territory of the Former Yugoslavia and abroad, including the following:

- "Broken Wings", Kragujevac, Serbia (1963)
- Monument to the Martirs of the Federación Obrera de Magallanes (FOM), Punta Arenas, Chile (1968)
- Monument to Yugoslav Immigrants, Punta Arenas, Chile (1970)
- Valley of Heroes, Tjentište, Bosnia & Herzegovina (1971)
- Monument to Fallen Fighters, Priština, Kosovo (1971)
- Monumental Crypt, Gonars, Italy (1973)
- Memorial Park "Uprising and Revolution", Grahovo, Montenegro (1978)
- Kadinjača Memorial Complex, near Užice, Serbia (1952–1979)
- "Freedom", Ulcinj, Montenegro (1985)
- Monument to the Royal Yugoslav Air Force defenders of Belgrade, New Belgrade, Serbia (1994)

== Gallery ==
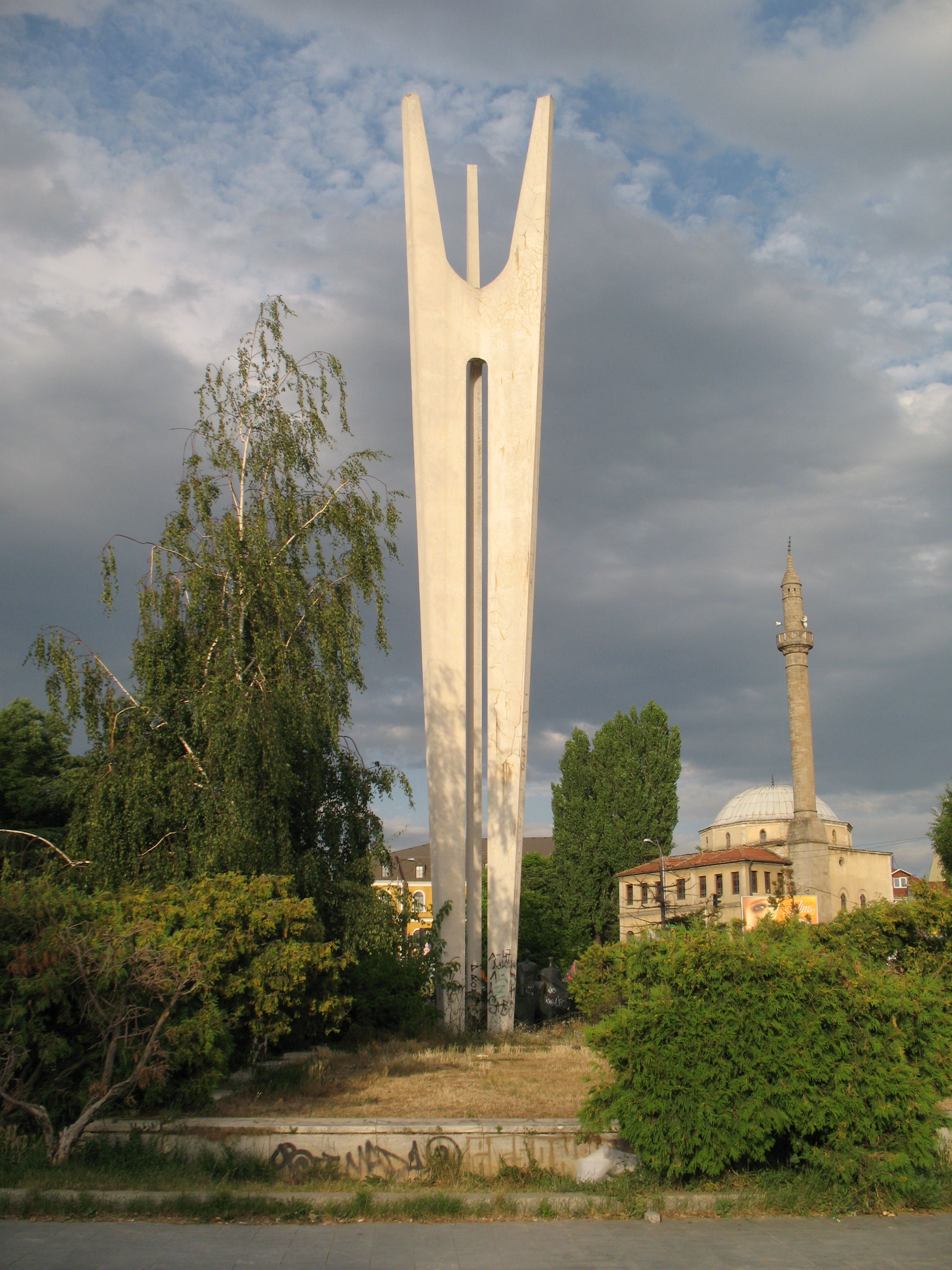
Monument of Brotherhood and Unity in Priština, 1961

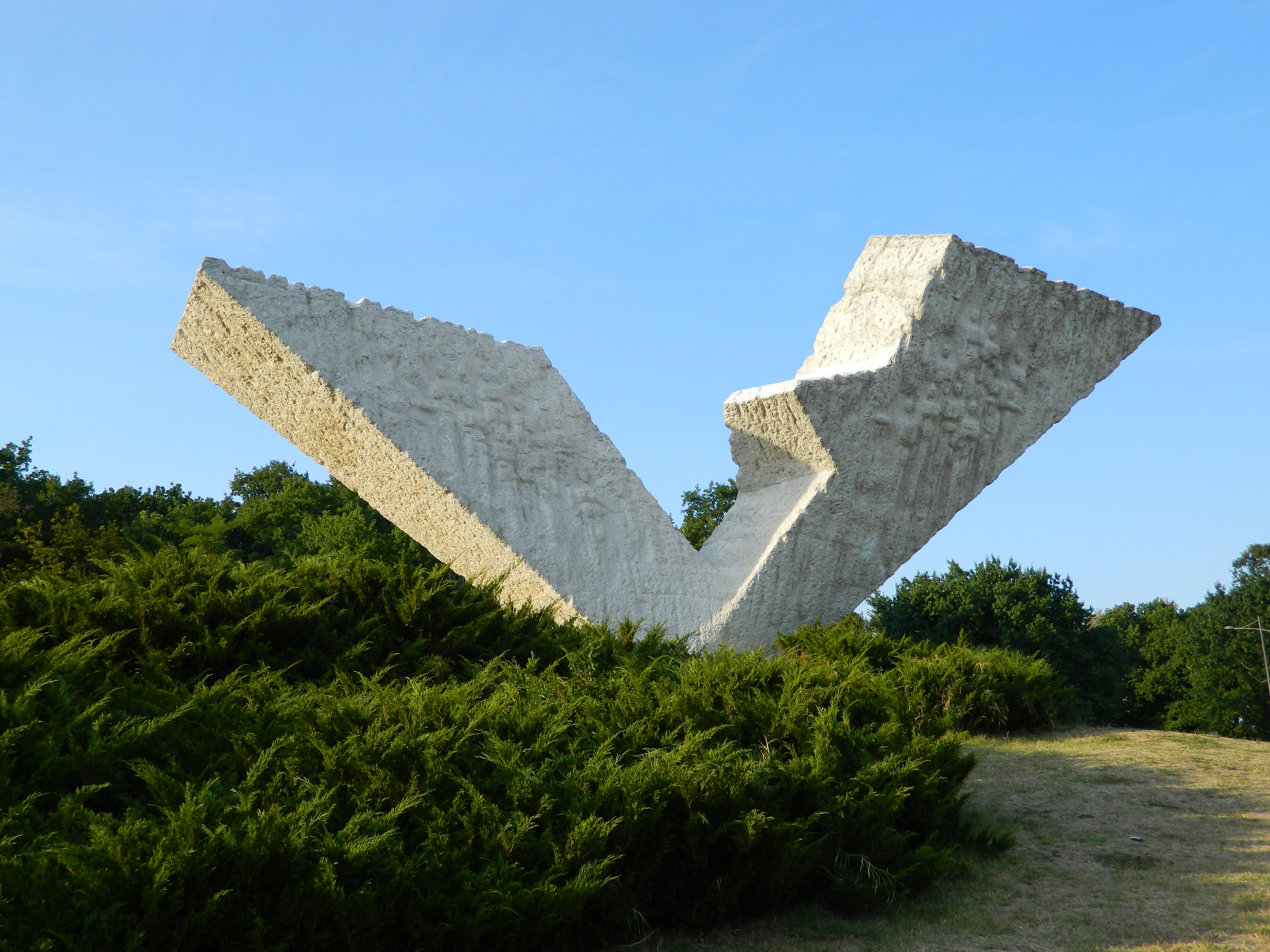
The Interrupted Flight is a part of Šumarice Memorial Park dedicated to the hundreds of children murdered by German Nazis on 21 October 1941 in Kragujevac massacre, 1963

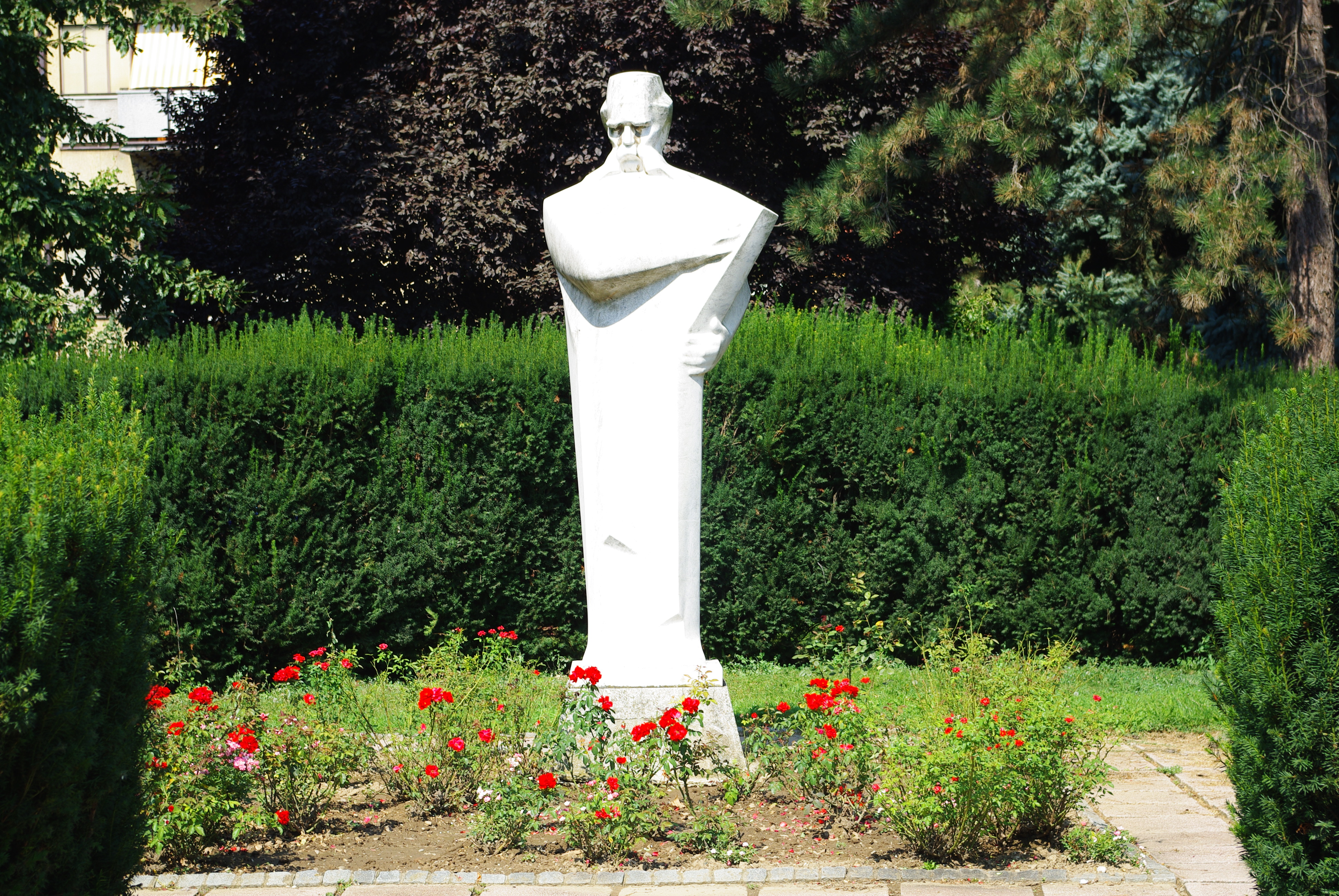
Monument dedicated to Vuk Stefanović Karadžić, Loznica 1964

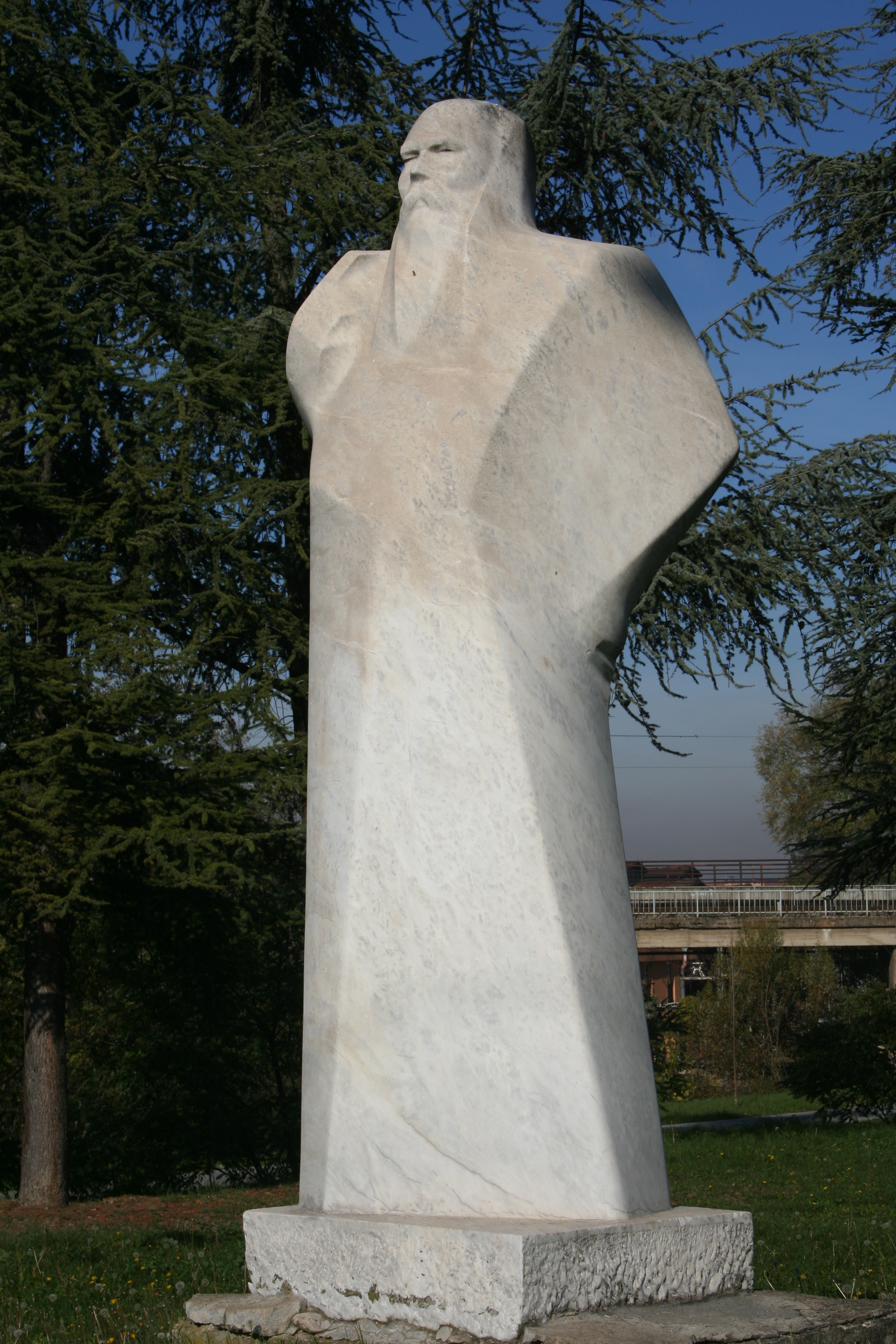
Monument dedicated to Milovan Glišić, Valjevo 1968

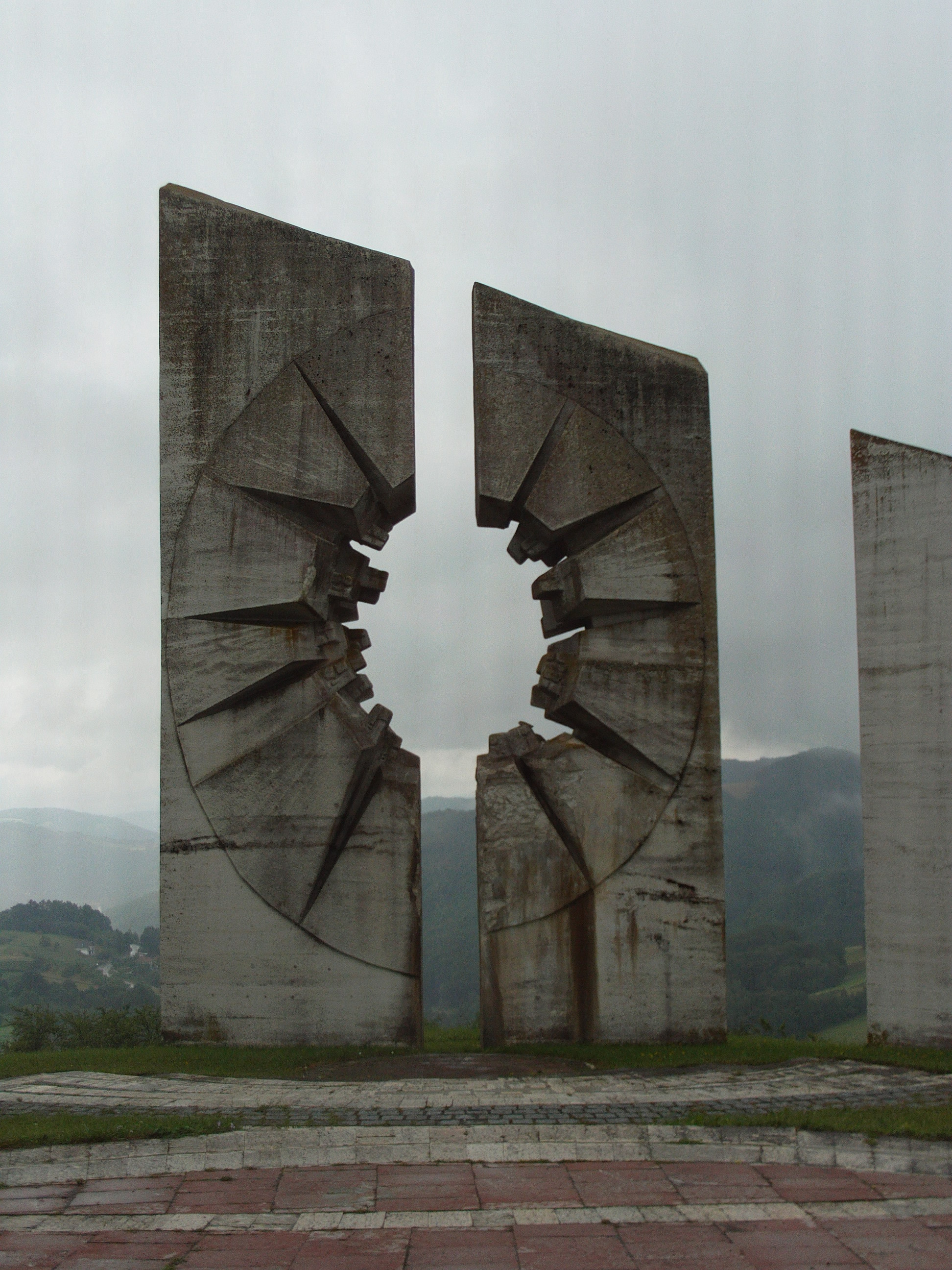
Kadinjača complex near Užice, 1979

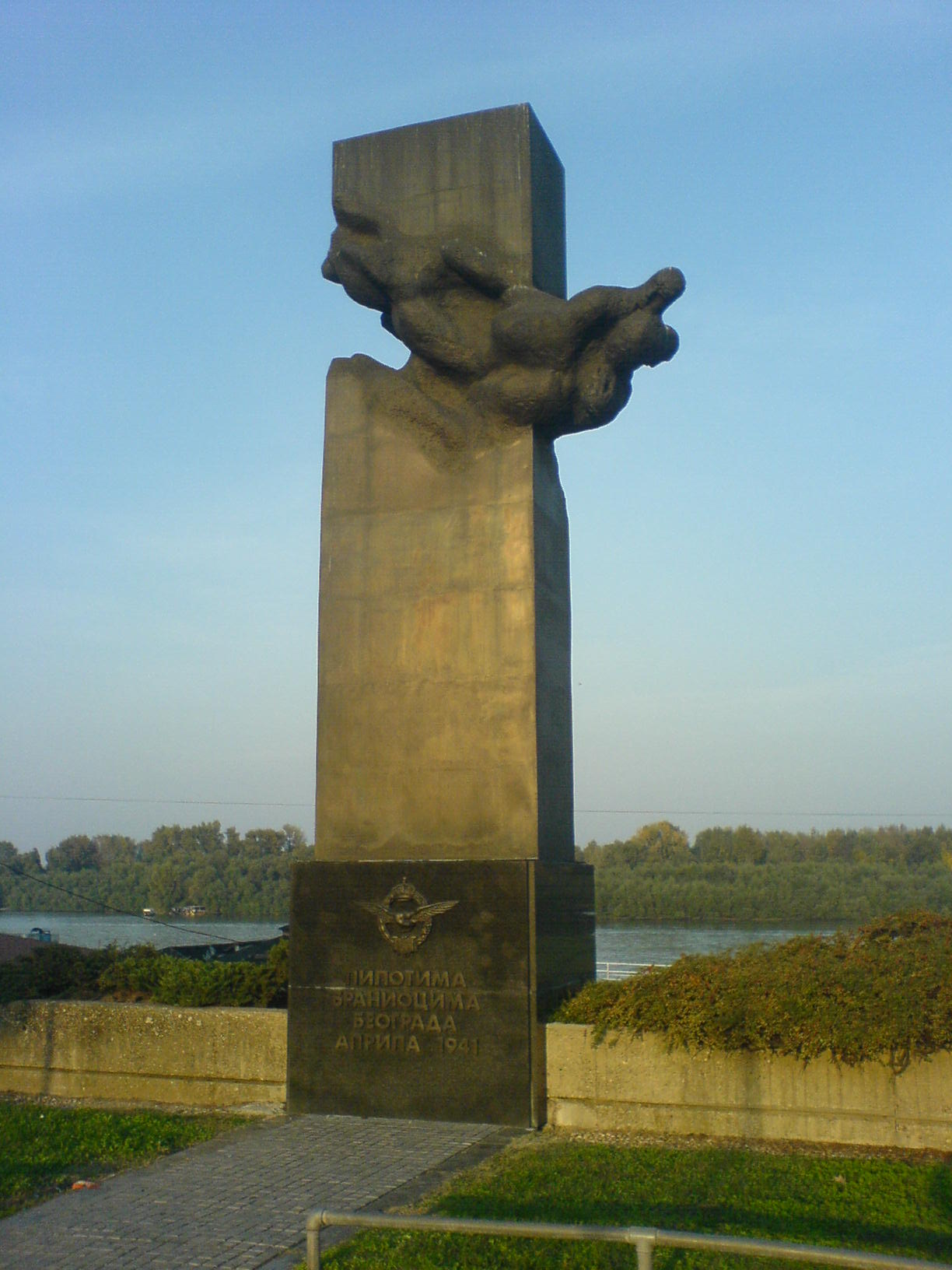
Monument to the Royal Yugoslav Air Force defenders of Belgrade, located in New Belgrade
