= List of People's Heroes of Yugoslavia monuments in North Macedonia =

There were 1,322 individuals who were decorated by the Order of the People's hero of Yugoslavia between 1942 and 1973. Many busts and memorials were built in honor of each People's hero. Each of them usually had a bust in his birthplace or at the place of his death. Most of these monuments are built in figurative style, but some of them were completely abstract, for example, monument of Ivo Lola Ribar, built at Glamoč field in 1962.

== Monument list ==
Image	Name	Location	Notes
	Bust of Mirče Acev	Prilep	
	Bust of Mirče Acev	Prilep	
	Statue of Mihailo Apostolski	Skopje	
	Bust of Kiro Krstev Atanasovski	Kavadarci	
	Bust of Dimitar Bogoevski	Ohrid	
	Bust of Dimitar Bogoevski	Bolno	
	Dimitar Bogoevski memorial plaque	Bolno	On the house where Bogoevski lived.
	Statue of Josip Broz Tito	Skopje	
	Bust of Josip Broz Tito	Tetovo	
	Bust of Orde Čopela	Prilep	
	Bust of Orde Čopela	Prilep	
	Bust of Cvetan Dimov	Skopje	
	Bust of Lazo Filiposki Lavski	Prilep	
	Statue of Čede Filipovski - Dame	Gostivar	
	Bust of Čede Filipovski - Dame	Mavrovi Anovi	
	Bust of Čede Filipovski - Dame	Nikiforovo	
	Bust of Čede Filipovski - Dame	Radoviš	
	Bust of Kire Gavriloski Jane	Prilep	
	Bust of Pero Georgievski - Čičo	Kumanovo	
	Bust of Ile Igeski Cvetan	Prilep	
	Bust of Blagoj Jankov - Mučeto	Strumica	
	Bust of Vera Jocić	Kriva Palanka	
	Monument of Vera Jocić	Makedonska Kamenica	Designed by Tome Serafimovski.
	Bust of Vera Jocić	Skopje	Designed by Vida Jocić.
	Bust of Josif Josifovski - Sveštarot	Gevgelija	
	Bust of Josif Josifovski - Sveštarot	Josifovo	
	Bust of Josif Josifovski - Sveštarot	Resen	
	Bust of Josif Josifovski - Sveštarot	Strumica	
	Statue of Kuzman Josifovski - Pitu	Karpoš	
	Kuzman Josifovski - Pitu Memorial	Karpoš	On the place where Josifovski was killed, in the Kozle neighbourhood.
	Bust of Kuzman Josifovski - Pitu	Kisela Voda	
	Statue of Kuzman Josifovski - Pitu	Prilep	
	Bust of Kuzman Josifovski - Pitu	Prilep	
	Bust of Kuzman Josifovski - Pitu	Prilep	
	Statue of Kuzman Josifovski - Pitu	Skopje	
	Bust of Kuzman Josifovski - Pitu	Skopje	
	Bust of Kuzman Josifovski - Pitu	Struga	
	Statue of Rade Jovčevski - Korčagin	Skopje	
	Rade Jovčevski - Korčagin Memorial	Skopje	On the place where the birthhouse of Jovčevski was once located.
	Bust of Liman Kaba	Debar	
	Bust of Elpida Karamandi	Bitola	
	Bust of Elpida Karamandi	Bitola	
	Bust of Elpida Karamandi	Gorno Orizari	
	Bust of Vasko Karangeleski	Brusnik	
	Bust of Boris Kidrič	Skopje	
	Bust of Fana Kočovska	Bitola	
	Monument of Lazar Koliševski	Sveti Nikole	Built in 2001. Dedicated to Lazar Koliševski, Macedonian revolutionary and the leader of the Communist party of Macedonia.
	Bust of Rade Končar	Skopje	
	Bust of Radovan Kovačević Maksim	Gevgelija	
	Bust of Rampo Levkov	Prilep	
	Bust of Rampo Levkov	Prilep	
	Bust of Zlate Malakovski	Mavrovi Anovi	
	Bust of Manču Matak	Krivogaštani	
	Bust of Manču Matak	Kruševo	
	Bust of Mirko Milevski - Uroš	Kičevo	
	Bust of Dimče Mirčev	Veles	
	Bust of Dimče Mirčev	Veles	
	Bust of Slobodan Mitrov Danko	Gevgelija	
	Monument of Stevan Naumov - Stiv	Bitola	Dedicated to Stevan Naumov, member of the Central committee of the Communist party of Macedonia.
	Bust of Stevan Naumov - Stiv	Bitola	
	Stevan Naumov - Stiv Memorial	Bolno	On the place where Naumov was killed.
	Bust of Stevan Naumov - Stiv and Gorgi Naumov	Logovardi	Only Stevan Naumov Stiv was proclaimed People's Hero.
	Bust of Stevan Naumov - Stiv	Logovardi	
	Bust of Jordan Nikolov Orce	Skopje	
	Bust of Estreya Ovadya	Bitola	
	Bust of Ibe Palikuća	Debar	
	Bust of Ibe Palikuća	Kičevo	
	Bust of Boro Petruševski	Skopje	
	Boro Petruševski memorial plaque	Skopje	On the house where Petruševski have lived.
	Bust of Strašo Pindžur	Josifovo	
	Bust of Strašo Pindžur	Kavadarci	
	Bust of Strašo Pindžur	Vataša	
	Bust of Panče Poposki	Debar	
	Bust of Vančo Prke Sermen	Gevgelija	
	Slavčo Stojmenski memorial plaque	Štip	On the house where Stojmenski have lived.
	Bust of Blagoj Stračkovski	Veles	
	Bust of Borko Taleski	Prilep	
	Bust of Blažo Todorovski Čičeto	Kavadarci	
	Bust of Hristijan Todorovski Karpoš	Dragomance	
	Bust of Vangel Todorovski	Bitola	
	Bust of Aleksandar Urdarevski	Čučer-Sandevo	
	Aleksandar Urdarevski memorial plaque	Čučer-Sandevo	On the house where Urdarevski have lived.
	Bust of Borka Veleski	Prilep	
	Bust of Krume Volnaroski	Prilep	

== See also ==
- People's Heroes of Yugoslavia monuments
- People's Heroes of Yugoslavia monuments in Croatia
- People's Heroes of Yugoslavia monuments in Bosnia and Herzegovina
- People's Heroes of Yugoslavia monuments in Serbia
- List of People's Heroes of Yugoslavia monuments in Slovenia
- List of Yugoslav World War II monuments and memorials
- List of World War II monuments and memorials in Bosnia and Herzegovina
- List of World War II monuments and memorials in Croatia
- List of World War II monuments and memorials in North Macedonia
- List of World War II monuments and memorials in Serbia
- List of World War II monuments and memorials in Slovenia
