= Kotse Seizov =

Macedonian revolutionary

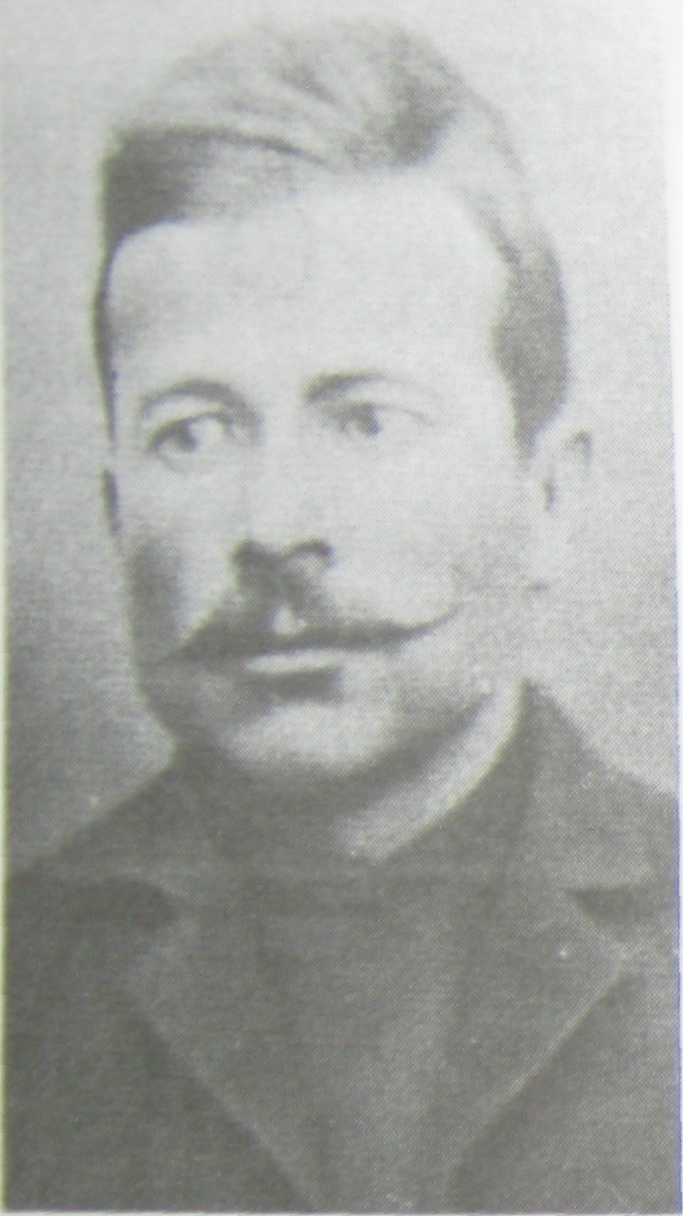
- Born: Kavadarci, Ottoman Empire (now North Macedonia)
- Allegiance: IMRO; Kingdom of Bulgaria
- Awards: Silver Medal of Merit

Konstantin (Kotse or Kotso) Seizov(Kavadarci 1879–???) was a Bulgarian revolutionary from the region of Macedonia and a member of the Internal Macedonian Revolutionary Organization. In modern North Macedonia, Seizov is regarded an Ethnic Macedonian.

== Biography ==
Kotse Seizov was born in the Tikvesh town of Kavadarci, then in the Ottoman Empire. At the end of 1898 or the beginning of 1899, he joined IMRO. In April 1903, together with other Kavadarci, he was arrested by the Turkish authorities and tortured on suspicion of collecting money to buy weapons for the Organization. He participated in the Ilinden uprising of 1903. In 1913, he became a member of the revolutionary staff of the Tikvesh Uprising, which also included Mikhail Shkartov, Lazar Banyanski, Hristo Mihov, Atanas Murjev, Todor Kamchev, Pano Izmirliev, Melo Yanev, Todor Mitsev, Gligor Linin, Evtim Monev, Doncho Lazarov, Vasil Sazdov, Dimitar Pindjurov, Atanas Bozhkov, Traicho Trushiyata, Gosho Golev, Jovanche Shoshev, Milan Atanasov and Milan Acev.

For excellent service in the Bulgarian Army during the First World War in 1918, Kotse Seizov was awarded the Silver Medal of Merit, which was given only to officers. He is the father of the Bulgarian journalist and public figure Vasil Seizov.
