= Doncho Lazarov =

Macedonian Bulgarian revolutionary

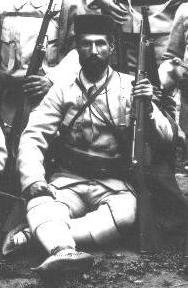
- Nickname: Voivode
- Born: 30 January 1878; Vataša, Ottoman Empire
- Died: 1950 Petrich, Bulgaria
- Allegiance: IMRO
- Conflicts: Macedonian Struggle; Ilinden-Preobrazhenie Uprising; Balkan Wars; Tikves Uprising; Incident at Petrich

Doncho Lazarov (Bulgarian and Macedonian: Дончо Лазаров, was a Macedonian Bulgarian revolutionary, voivode of Tikvesh and a member of the Internal Macedonian Revolutionary Organization (IMRO). Later he became an insurgent leader for the Tikvesh Uprising.

== Biography ==
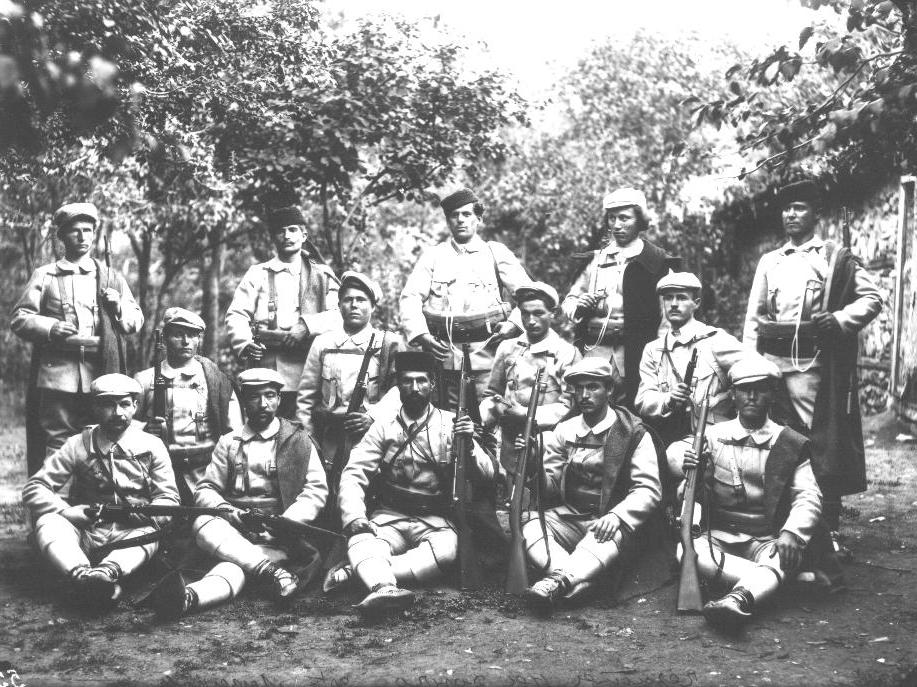
Doncho Lazarov with his cheta in 1907.

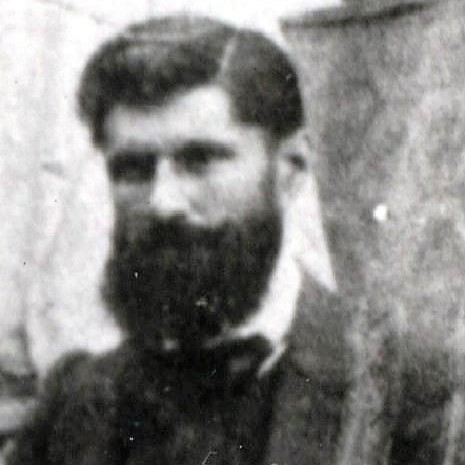
Doncho Lazarov

He came from a revolutionary family, and their house was often inhabited by old Tikvesh anti-Ottoman hajduks. He was admitted to the ranks of the Internal Macedonian Revolutionary Organization at the age of less than twenty years. He graduated from a Bulgarian pedagogical school of Skopje. He was appointed as a Bulgarian teacher in Tikveshko. Before the Tikvesh Uprising, he was involved in the preparations of the Organization and contributed to the organization of an illegal workshop in the school in Vataša for the production of clothes for the Komitadji. He also took part in the attack on the farmstead of Azis Aga, near the village of Moklište in the Ilinden Uprising 1903.

In 1904 he left his teaching job in Kavadarci and joined the company of Dobri Daskalov. His violent temperament was often the reason for the frequent clashes he had with the local Turks in the village of Vatasha and was often arrested and imprisoned. At the end of 1905 he was appointed District Voivode of Tikvesh. With his help, during July 1905, the detachment of Dobri Daskalov managed to get out of the encirclement of the Turkish army near the village of Resava. His desire to become a district voivode of Tikvesh often confronted him with the district voivode and the local leadership of the revolutionary organization, so in the winter of 1907 it was decided that he would go to Bulgaria for some time. He remained there until the Young Turk Revolution of 1908.

On 1 July 1907 he left for Macedonia from the Kyustendil checkpoint in IMRO. He was arrested and imprisoned several times by the Turkish authorities. After the Young Turk Revolution and the formation of the People's Federative Party (Bulgarian Section) (NFP), Doncho Lazarov was one of its first members, and for some time he was the leader of the PFP in Kavaderčko. After the disappointment of the Young Turk Revolution, he again became a komita under Lazar Todorov. In June 1913 he was among the organizers and leaders of the Tikvesh Uprising against the Serbian government. After the suppression of the uprising, most of the komiti withdrew from Tikvesh. Only Doncho Lazarov and his band remained.

After the First World War he moved to Bulgaria and settled in Petrich where he worked in the Permanent district commission. In 1921 he was elected mayor of Petrich. In October 1925, during the Incident at Petrich, he participated in the defense of Petrich from the Greek invasion. In October 1928 he was elected a member of a Commission for the reconciliation of the opposing sides in IMRO, formed by the Ilinden Organization. In 1930 he was elected president of the Macedonian charitable brotherhood "Hristo Matov" in the town. He died in 1950 in Petrich.
