= Dimitar Pindzhurov =

Bulgarian revolutionary (died 1915)

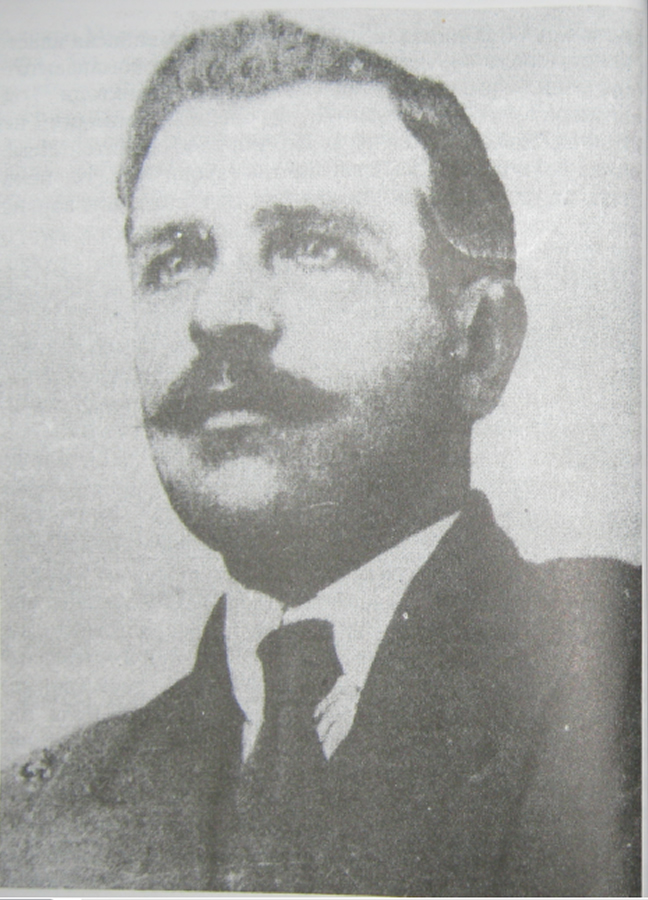
Picture of Dimitar Pindzhurov

Dimitar Arsov Pindzhurov was a Bulgarian revolutionary, and activist of the Internal Macedonian-Adrianople Revolutionary Organization (IMARO) and a Bulgarian teacher.

== Early life and education ==
Dimitar Pindzhurov was born in 1883 then Ottoman village of Vataša, today in North Macedonia. He studied in Kavadarci and later at the Bulgarian Men's High School of Thessaloniki. After graduation, he returned to Vataša, where he worked as a Bulgarian teacher. Later he joined the IMARO.

== Activism ==
In the spring of 1905, he joined the detachment of Dobri Daskalov. After the Young Turk Revolution of 1908, Pindzhurov moved to Gevgelija and became one of the leaders of the Bulgarian People's Federative Party. He fought the Grecomans in this area. In 1911, he returned to his native Tikvešia. He married the same year, but after the repressions of the Young Turks began, he joined the detachment of Hristo Chernopeev with which he participated in the Balkan Wars, supporting the Bulgarian troops.

In June 1913, he took part in the anti-Serbian Tikvesh Uprising. His mother, Naca, a longtime IMARO activist, took part in the uprising and was brutally abused by Serbs. After the suppression of the uprising, he moved with his family to Strumica, which was handed over to Bulgaria, and worked in the town as a Bulgarian teacher.

== Later life ==
In March 1915, his son was born in Strumica, and his godfather Chernopeev gave him the name Strahil Pindzhurov. He took part as a non-commissioned officer with the Bulgarian Army in the First World War and died in the Battle of Krivolak in the autumn of 1915.

== See also ==
- Bulgarian occupation of Serbia (World War I)
- Strahil Pindzhurov
