= Dobri Daskalov =

Bulgarian revolutionary

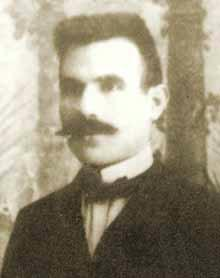
- Native name: Добри Даскалов
- Born: 13 October 1882; Kavadarci Ottoman Empire (now North Macedonia)
- Died: 16 June 1912 (aged 29) Kavadarci Ottoman Empire (now North Macedonia)
- Cause of death: Assassination order by Todor Aleksandrov
- Allegiance: IMRO
- Conflicts: Macedonian Struggle; Ilinden-Preobrazhenie Uprising; Balkan Wars; Tikveš uprising

Dobri Daskalov (13 October 1882 – 16 June 1912) was a Bulgarian revolutionary, member and voivode of the Internal Macedonian Revolutionary Organization. In today North Macedonia, he is regarded an Ethnic Macedonian.

== Biography ==
Dobri Daskalov was born in Kavadarci into a Protestant clerical family. He studied at the Bulgarian Junior High School in Kavadarci and then continued his education in Samokov, Bulgaria, where Daskalov studied at the American Missionary Protestant School. In the 1896/1897 school year, he enrolled in the State Ironwork School, together with Petar Samardzhiev and Petar Yurukov. There he began his revolutionary activity and became a member of the revolutionary circle "Trayko Kitanchev". Daskalov became a member of TMORO in 1901 and was a fighter in the bands of Jane Sandanski and Hristo Chernopeev. He took part in the Miss Stone Affair. In the Ilinden Uprising, he fought in the Tikvesh. In 1904 he participated at the local Prilep congress of TMORO, and in 1905 – in the general Rila congress. On 13 June 1905 he took part in a battle with the Ottoman army in the village of Resava. After the split of the Organization in 1907, he participated in the congress of the rightist faction held in Kyustendil in 1908. After the Young Turk Revolution, in 1909 he was one of the founders of the People's Federative Party (Bulgarian Section) and a member of its central leadership.

He was assassinated in Kavadarci on 16 June 1912 on the order of Todor Aleksandrov.
