= Mihail Shkartov =

Mihail Shkaratov
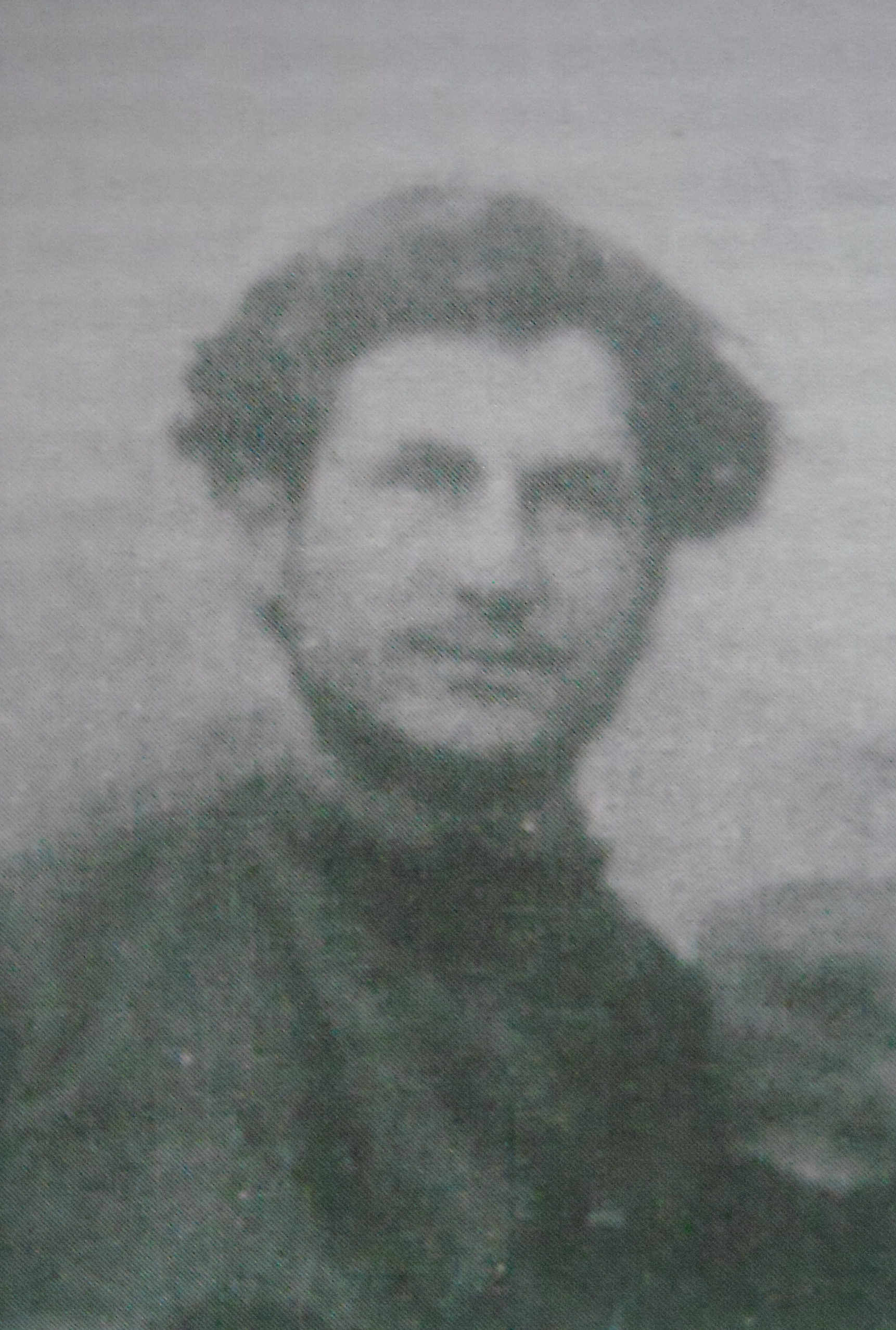
- Native name: Михаил Шкратов
- Born: 1 February 1884 Kavadarci, Ottoman Empire
- Died: 25 June 1936 (aged 52) Sofia, Bulgaria
- Allegiance: IMRO
- Known for: Tikvesh Uprising
- Battles / wars: Macedonian Struggle; Ilinden Uprising; First Balkan War; Tikvesh Uprising

Mihail Shkartov (1 February 1883 in Kavadarci – 25 June 1936 in Sofia) was a Macedonian Bulgarian revolutionary, voivode of Veles and a member of the Internal Macedonian Revolutionary Organization. He is considered an Ethnic Macedonian in North Macedonia.

== Biography ==
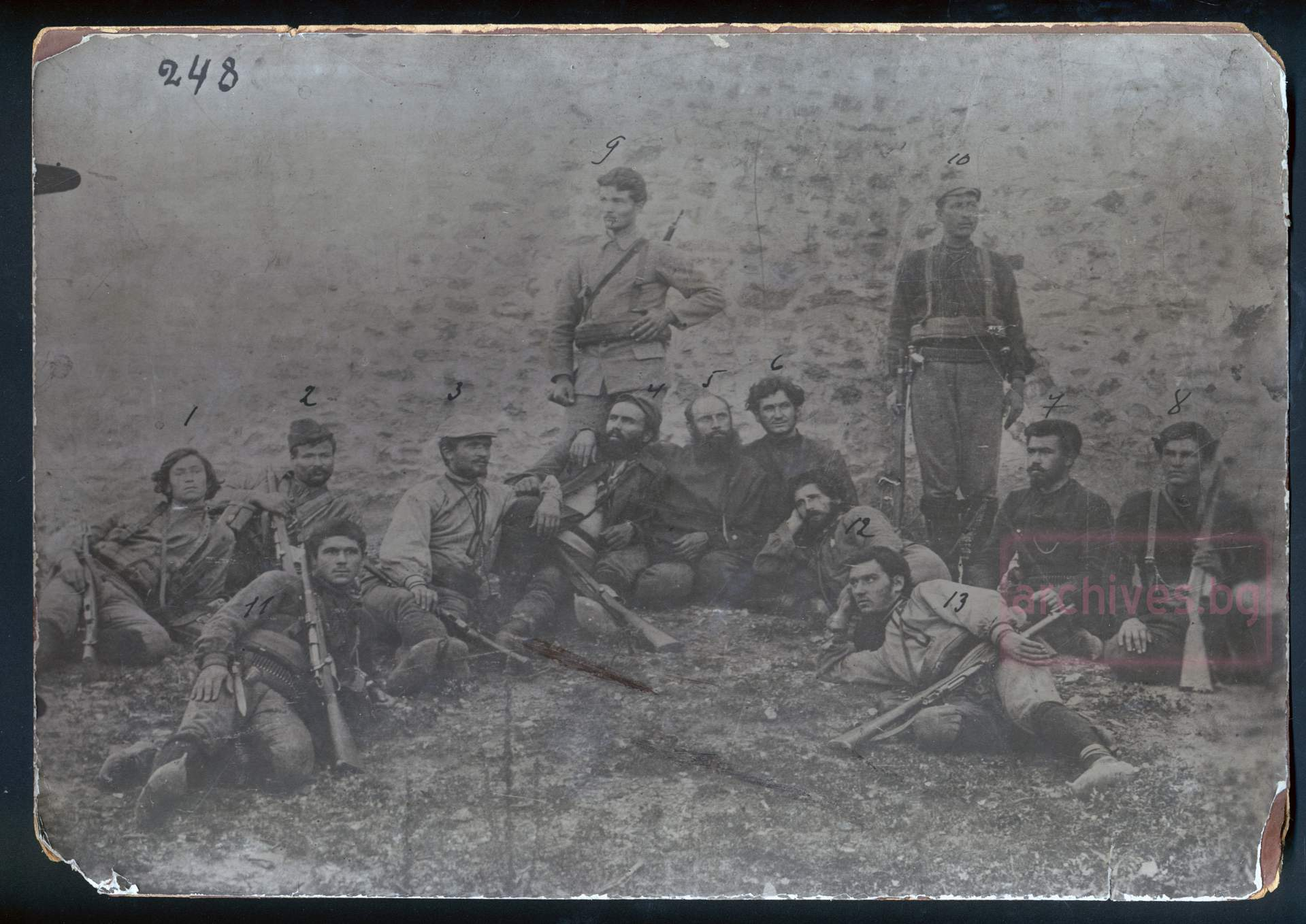
Mihail Shkartov with other revolutionaries which among them was Yane Sandanski

Mihail Shkartov was born in Kavadarci in 1884. He graduated from the Bulgarian Men's High School of Thessaloniki. He taught in the village of Dolni Poroy, today in Sintiki, Demirhisar and in Kavadarci. During his time as a teacher in Kavadarci he was elected a member of the District Revolutionary Committee of TMORO in 1904. In the same year he became illegal and acted as a komitadji under the leadership of Dobri Daskalov, and later in the band of Jane Sandanski. He participated in the campaign against Istanbul in 1908 led by Jane Sandanski in support of the Young Turk Revolution. After the formation of the People's Federative Party (Bulgarian Section) Shkaratov joined it. In 1911 he acted again as a voivoda in Veleško. He was one of the main organizers of the Tikvesh Uprising in 1913. After the Balkan wars he continued the anti-Serbian struggle in this area, where he awaited the Bulgarian occupation of Serbia.

After World War I he supported the Provisional representation of the former United Internal Revolutionary Organization. In 1920 he was elected head of the Thessaloniki Revolutionary District, and was elected district voivoda. In 1924 he was appointed voivoda of Tikvesh County. He was one of the delegates to the Sixth Congress of the Organization in 1925. After the split in the organization in 1928, he joined the Protogerovist wing. At a meeting on July 20, 1928, Shkartov and other members of the leadership of the Protogerovist wing, decided to make an attempt to take over Ivan Ivan Mihailov's bases in Pirin Macedonia, which led to heavy fratricidal conflict. In 1930 he joined IMRO (United) and was elected a member of the Central Committee. Shkartov, together with Mihail Gerdzhikov, headed the national-revolutionary wing of the organization, which opposed the pro-communist faction. In 1931, on the orders of Vancho Mihailov and a promise that his life would be spared, he withdrew from revolutionary activity. He died in Sofia, Bulgaria 1936.
