= Stanušina Crna =

Variety of grape

- Grape (Vitis)
- Color of berry skin: Noir
- Species: Vitis vinifera
- Also called: Stanušina and other synonyms
- Origin: North Macedonia
- VIVC number: 11994

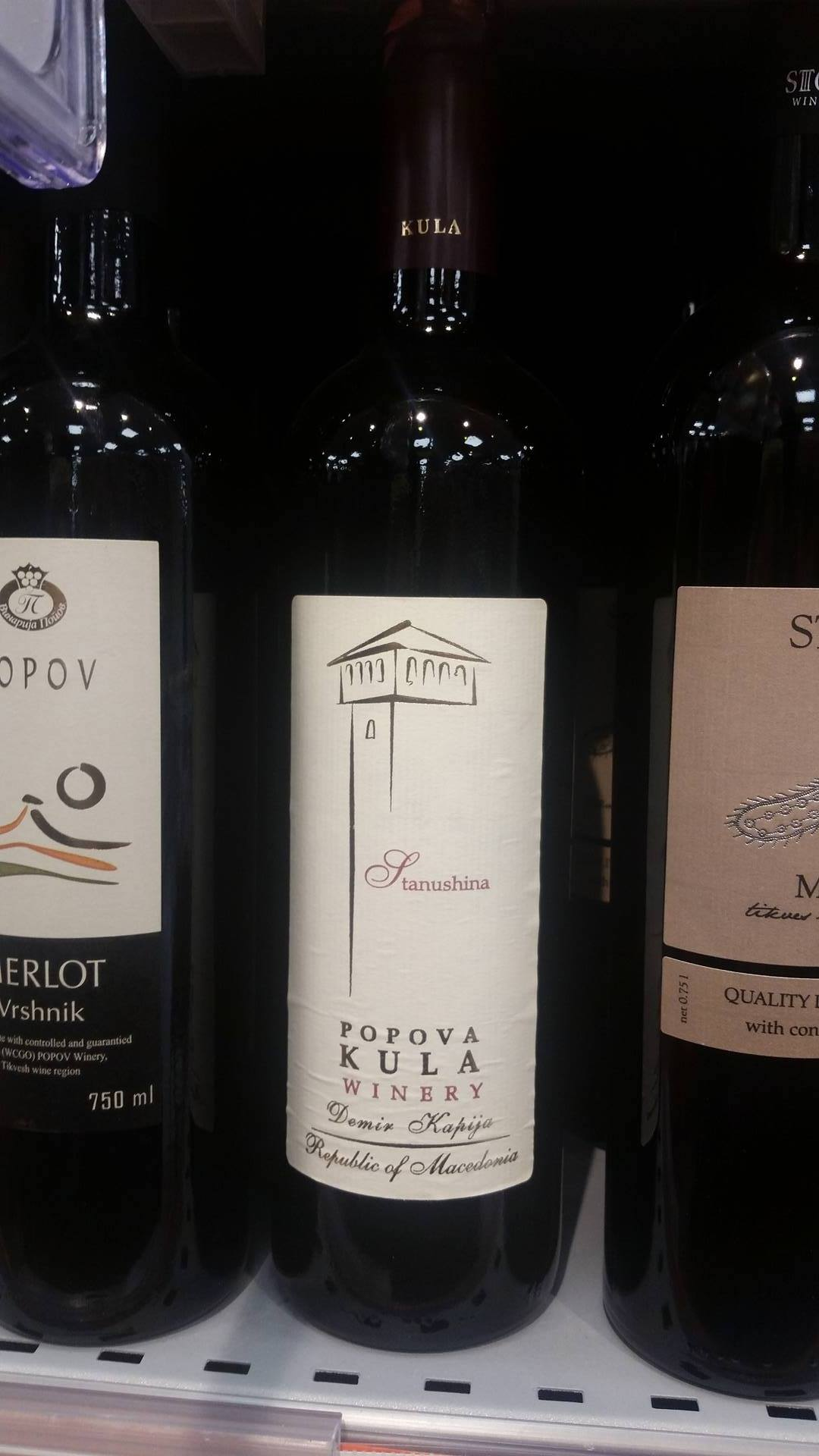
Stanušina Crna

Stanušina Crna or Stanušina (Macedonian: Станушина, also rendered as Stanushina) is a red grape variety indigenous to North Macedonia and is found nowhere else in the world. Little known outside of its native country, nonetheless it is capable of producing very high quality wines and is mainly grown in the Tikveš region.

The introduction of international grape varieties have caused a sharp decline of Stanušina from the country’s vineyards in recent times, threatening to wipe out this local variety of grape forever. Realizing this, local wineries have begun initiatives to reintroduce this uniquely old Macedonian domestic variety back into the region.

The grapevine is highly resistant to drought and pests and can be cultivated without irrigation. The fruit ripens very late but gives good yields, producing on average 15-20 t/ha. The juice obtained contains approx 18-20% sugar and 6-9 g/L acids. During a good year, it can provide a base for wine of high quality and medium strength, with 11-12% of alcohol. Rich in extract but characteristically pale in color, the high level of acid gives the wine excellent freshness and is recommended to be taken at a temperature of 10-16°C. Stanušina typically has a light strawberry, raspberry, blackcurrant and dry leaf aroma. It makes an excellent complement to white and yellow cheeses, light and creamy desserts, leaf salads, nuts and sweets.

== Kavadarka ==
Kavadarka (Macedonian: Кавадарка) is one of the oldest and most popular wines in North Macedonia. It is made from the grape Stanushina from the region of the city Kavadarci and that is how it gets the name. Although it is one of the cheaper wines in North Macedonia has a very good taste and quality. It is best served at temperature from 16 to 18 ^{о}C.

== Synonyms ==
Stanušina Crna is also known under the synonyms Gradech, Grades, Gradesh Tykveshjo, Stanochina, Stanouchina, Stanuchina, Stanuisna, Stanusina Grades, Stanusina Tikvesko, Tikvesko, Tikvesko Crno, Tsarna Stanushina, Tykveshko.
