= Petar Mazev =

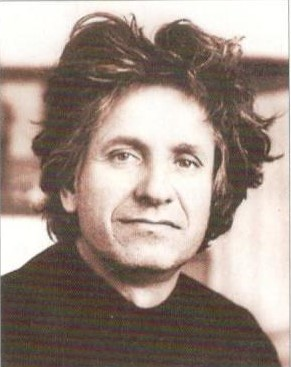
- Petar Mazev
- Born: February 10, 1927; Kavadarci, Kingdom of Yugoslavia
- Died: March 13, 1993 (aged 66); Skopje, Republic of Macedonia
- Education: Academy of arts in Belgrade, Zoran Petrović (painter)
- Occupation: Professor at the Faculty of Architecture in Skopje
- Known for: Painting, Mural, Mosaic, Ceramic art
- Notable work: Clowns (1990)
- Movement: Expressionism

Petar Mazev (February 10, 1927 in Kavadarci, Kingdom of Yugoslavia – March 13, 1993 in Skopje, Republic of Macedonia) was a Macedonian academic painter, who is considered one of the most important postwar painters who introduced new energy into contemporary Macedonian art.

== Education and career ==
He graduated from the Academy of arts in Belgrade in 1953 where he studied under painter Zoran Petrovic. He was professor at the Faculty of Architecture in Skopje. He had held individual exhibitions in the United States, China, India, France, Germany, Italy, Switzerland and other countries. He was a member of the artistic group "Mugri".

== Painting Style ==
Expressionism was a constant presence in his paintings, but before choosing expressionism, he went through several phases including his White Phase and Warm Phase. In the mid-1960s, Mazev started to include in his non-figurative paintings in muted colours and rendered in dense and grainy impasto with materials such as burnt wooden plates, glass, scrap-metal sheets, and sand. In addition to paintings (mostly oil on canvas), he was also the author of murals, mosaics and ceramic arts.

== Paintings ==
Clowns, 1990 by Petar Mazev
