= Dimče Mirčev =

Macedonian and Yugoslavian partisan

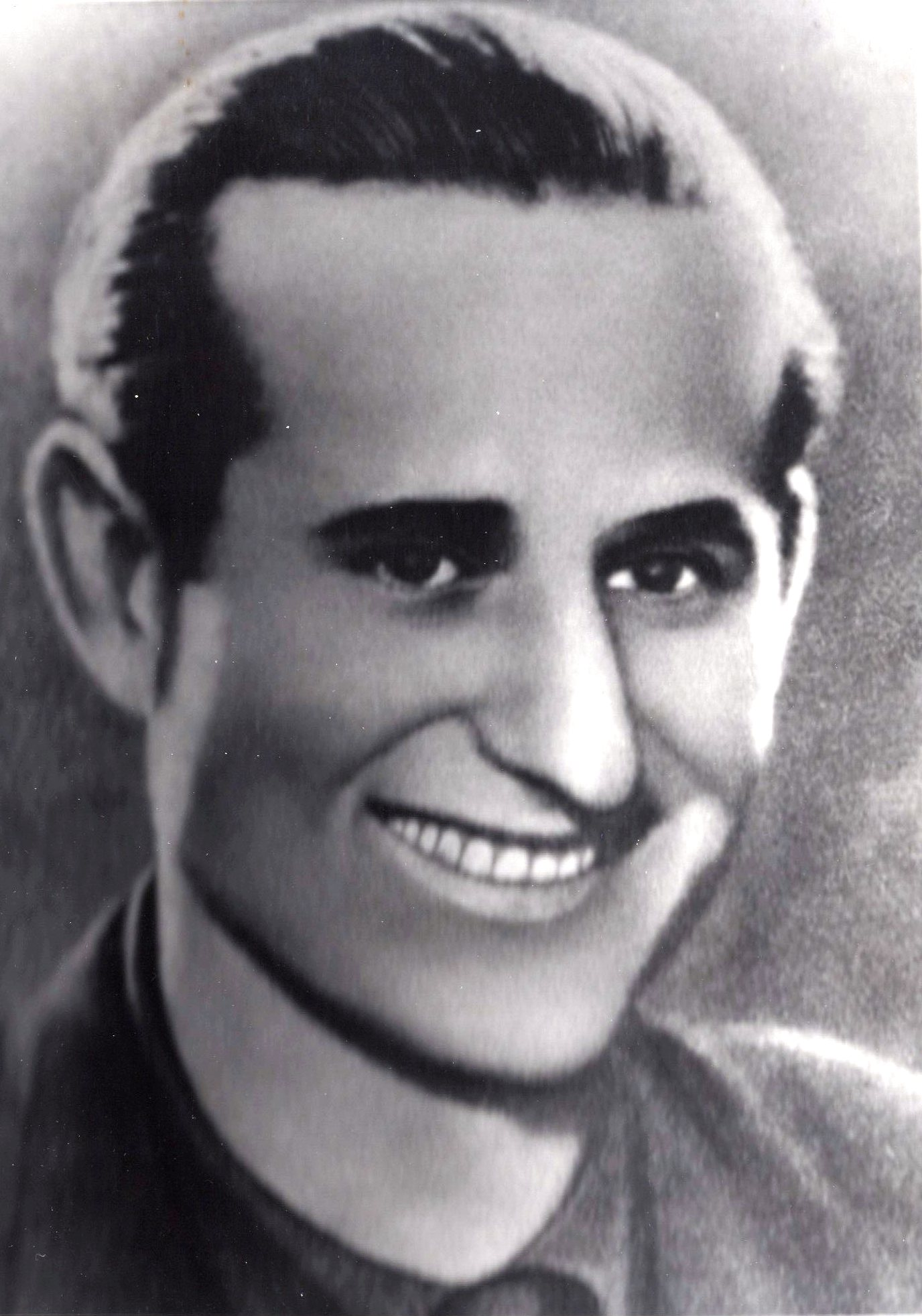
- Native name: Димче Мирчев
- Birth name: Димче Ѓошев Мирчев
- Born: November 13, 1913; Veles, Kingdom of Serbia
- Died: April 7, 1944; Kavadarci, Kingdom of Bulgaria
- Allegiance: Macedonian Partisans
- Awards: Order of The People's Hero

Dimče Gjošev Mirčev (Macedonian: Димче Ѓошев Мирчев; 13 November 1913 — 7 April 1944) was a Macedonian communist and partisan. He was awarded posthumously the Order of the People's Hero on 2 August 1949.

== Biography ==
Mirčev was born in Veles on 13 November 1913. After finishing primary school, he was sent to learn how to trade.

He became a member of Young Communist League of Yugoslavia in 1933 and Communist Party of Yugoslavia (KPJ) in 1937. In the period from 1937 to 1941, he organized several strikes in Macedonia and Serbia. In 1940, he was forced to return from Belgrade to Veles, where he was elected to the local committee of the KPJ. He was imprisoned several times.

=== During World War II ===
In 1941, he was actively involved in the preparations for the armed uprising. He was a member of the Military Committee at the Local Committee of the KPJ for Veles, organizer of the formation of the Veles Partisan detachment "Dimitar Vlahov" in April 1942, and deputy commander of the detachment from September of the same year.

After the disbandment of the detachment in 1943, he went underground. From February 1944 he went to work in Kavadarci, as the secretary of the Regional Committee of the KPM. Together with Kiro Krstev, they prepared a larger group to join the partisans. During a blockade in the town, the two encountered the Bulgarian police. Mirčev and Krstev found themselves surrounded in a house, on the outskirts of the city. They resisted for seven hours while they had ammunition, and afterwards they died. Their cause of death is disputed, according to some historians it was suicide after they ran out of ammo. but some have also suggested that they were killed by the Bulgarian police

== Legacy ==
The song "Dimče and Kiro Nalbatot" was sung in his honor and in honor of Kiro Atanasovski.

Five kindergartens in Veles are named after Mirčev.
