= Čede Filipovski Dame =

Yugoslav partisan

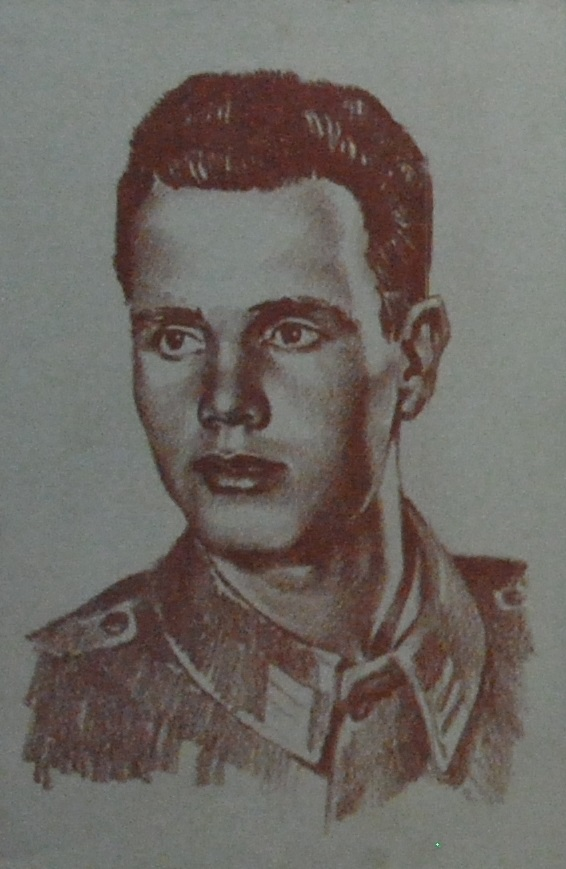
Čede Filipovski Dame

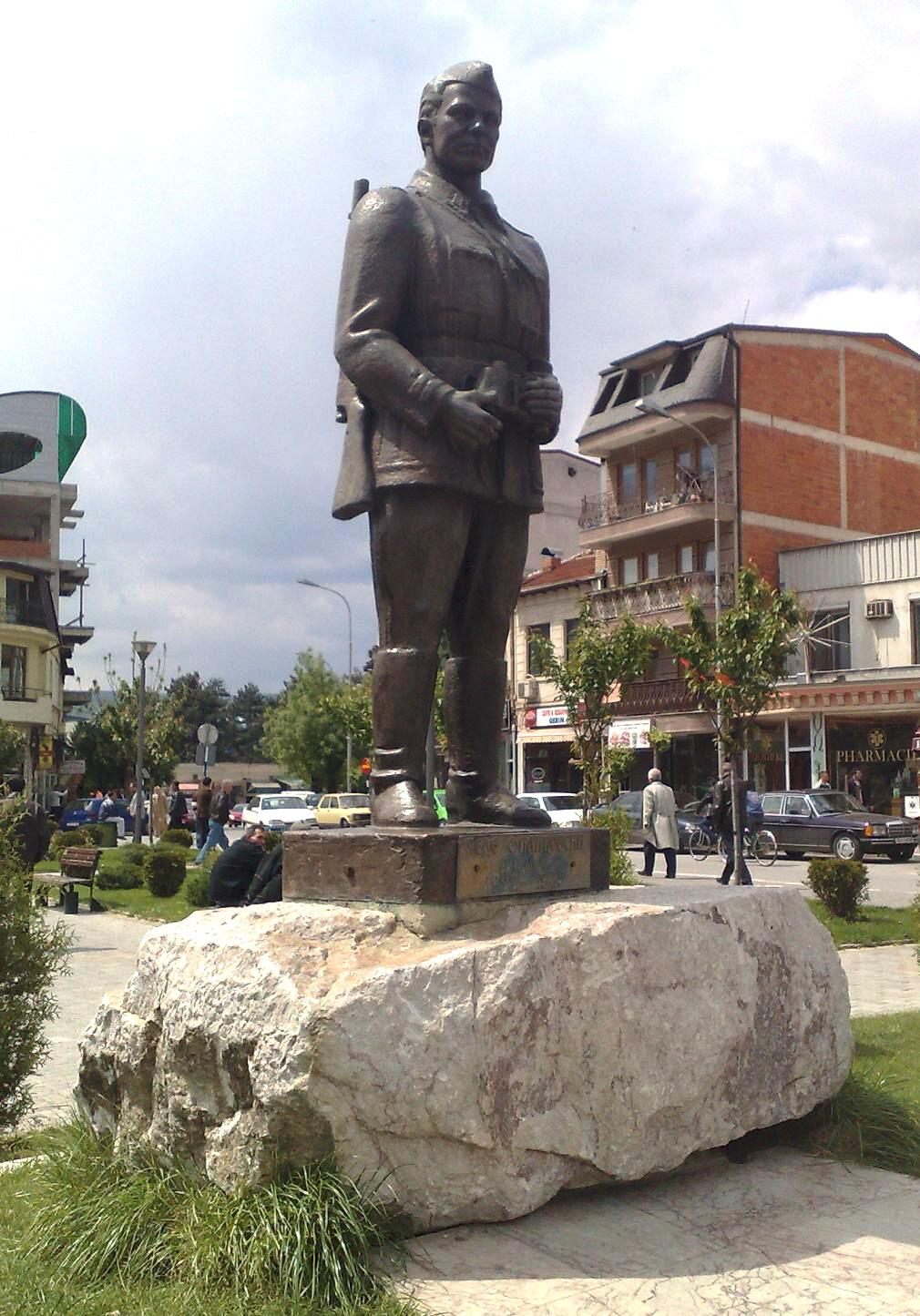
Monument in Gostivar.

Čede Filipovski - Dame (Macedonian: Чеде Филиповски - Даме) was born Čede Filipov - Dame (Bulgarian: Чеде Филипов - Дама) in 1923 in the village Nikiforovo (now in Mavrovo and Rostuša Municipality) near Gostivar. He participated in the Yugoslav Partisans during World War II from its beginning in Yugoslavia in 1941.

He died near Radoviš in a car accident, as the Commander of the 48th Macedonian Division, on 29 June 1945. There is a street in Radoviš named after him.

From December 1944 until his death, he was married to fellow freedom fighter Žamila Kolonomos. They had a daughter, Mira, who was born a month after his death.

Posthumously he was declared a People's Hero of Yugoslavia.

== Sources ==
- Daily Info Package of the Macedonian Information Agency (Thursday/November 16/2006)
- Jamila Kolonomos Collection at the United States Holocaust Memorial Museum
