= Mavrovi Anovi =

Mavrovi Anovi Маврови Анови
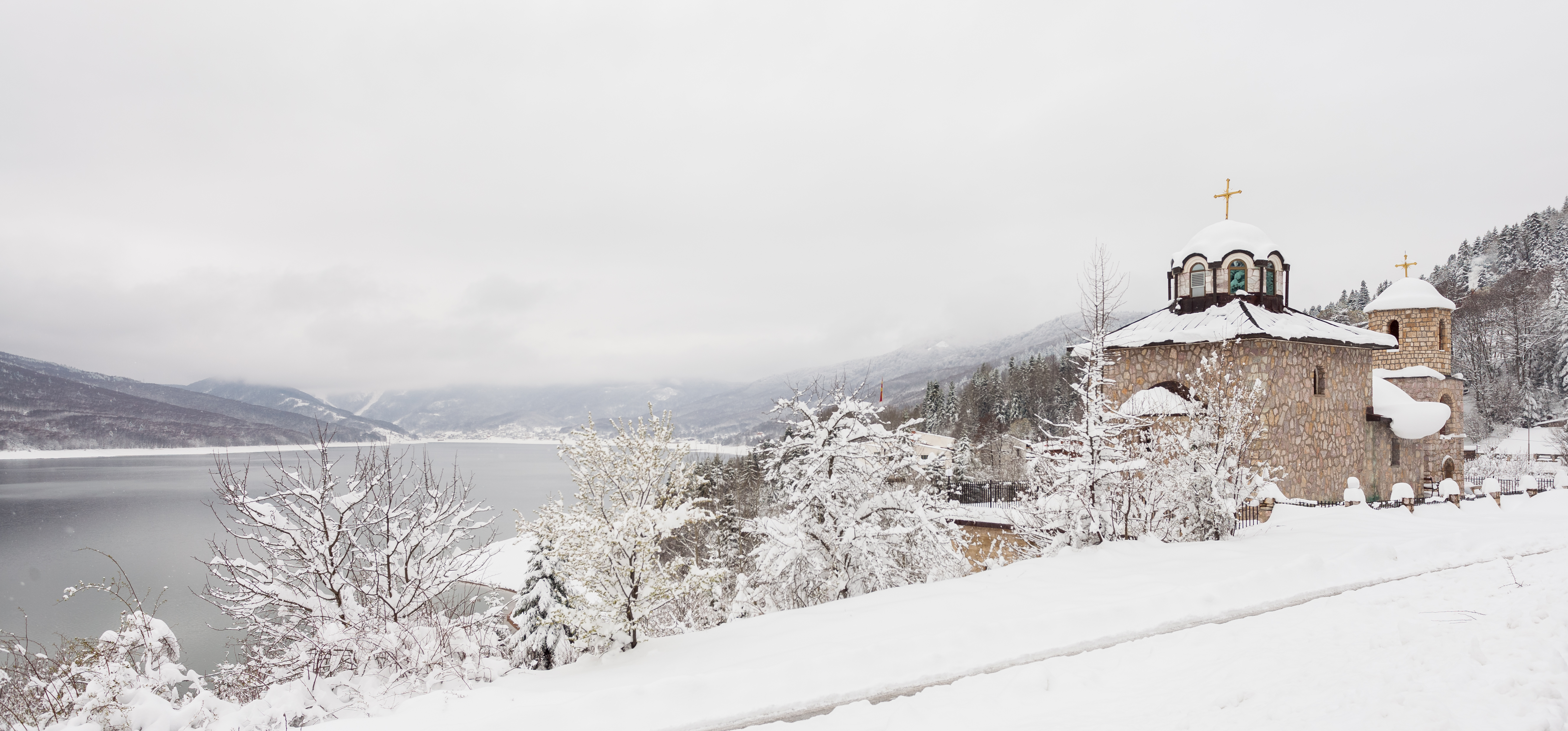
- Sts. Cyril and Methodius Church in Mavrovi Anovi

- Location within North Macedonia
- Country: North Macedonia
- Region: Polog
- Municipality: Mavrovo and Rostuša

Population (2002)
  - Total: 167
- Time zone: UTC+1 (CET)
  - Summer (DST): UTC+2 (CEST)

Mavrovi Anovi (Macedonian: Маврови Анови) is a village in the Mavrovo and Rostuša Municipality, Gostivar in North Macedonia. Its FIPS code was MK64.

== Demographics ==
According to the 2002 census, the village had a total of 167 inhabitants. Ethnic groups in the village include:

- Macedonians 137
- Turks 16
- Serbs 2
- Romani 10
- Others 2
