= Strašo Pindžur =

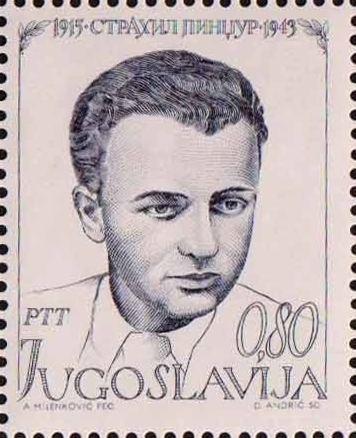

Strahil Pindžurov (15 March, 1915 – 4 January 1943), better known by his Partisan name Strašo Pindžur (Страшо Пинџур) was a Yugoslav Communist and Macedonian Partisan, active during World War II in Yugoslav Macedonia, who was later proclaimed a national hero of SFR Yugoslavia.

== Biography ==
Pindžurov was born in the town of Strumica, then part of Bulgaria. His father Dimitar Pindžurov was an IMRO activist and a Bulgarian teacher there. His godfather became Hristo Chernopeev, a friend of his father. Both were killed as servicemen of the Bulgarian Army during the First World War. After the war, Strumica was ceded to the Kingdom of Yugoslavia. Pindžur's mother re-married and Strašo was sent to his father's native village of Vataša, where he was raised by his grandmother. As a war orphan later, he was a state pupil in Kragujevac, where in secondary school he came in contact with the Yugoslav communist movement.

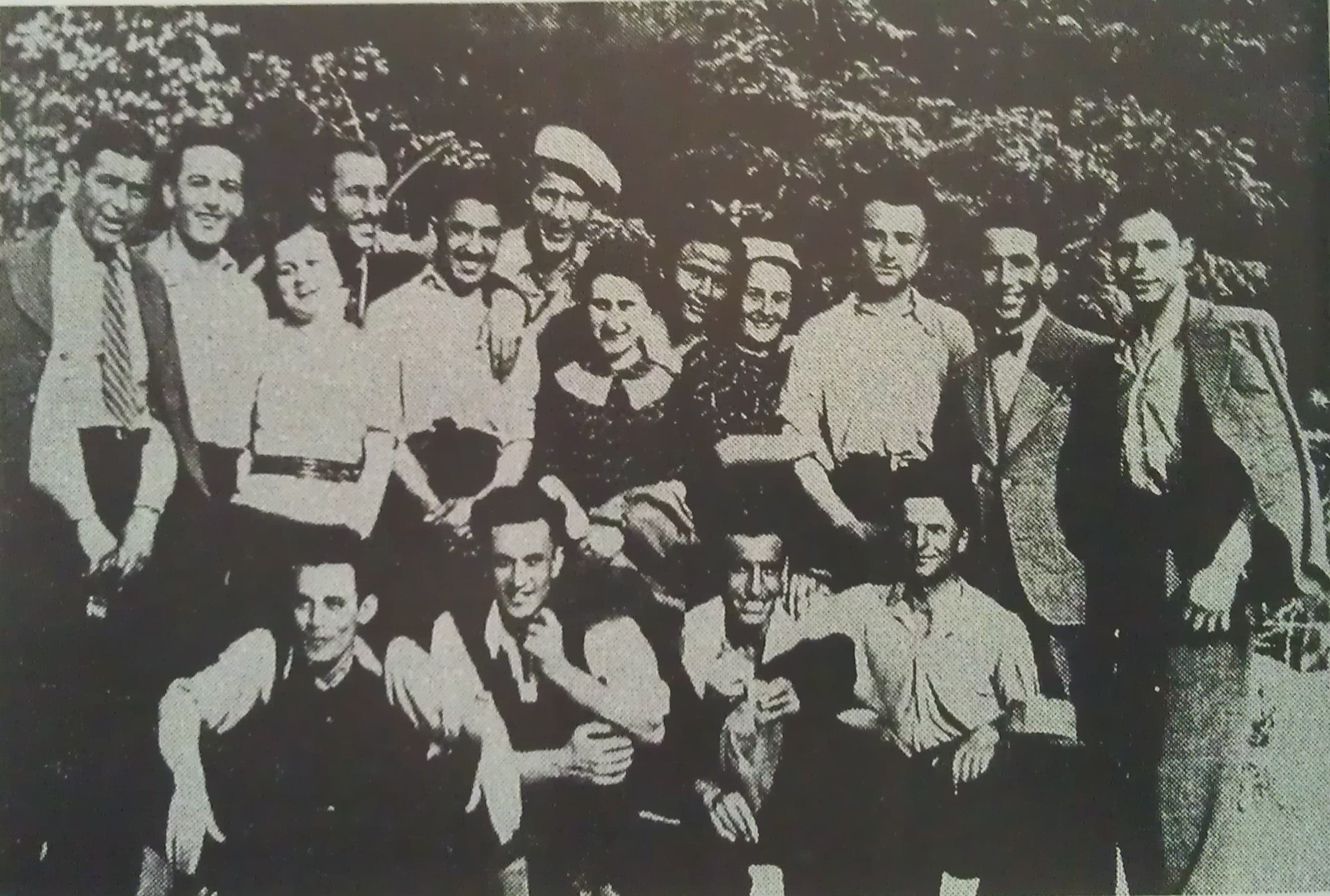
Strasho Pindzur with students, members of the "Vardar" society, 1936.

Strašo Pindžur studied at the University of Belgrade's Law School, and was a secretary of the illegal student association "Vardar". He was a close collaborator, and a friend of the Yugoslav communist Ivo Lola Ribar and participated in a number of demonstrations of the party. He tried to be a volunteer in the Spanish Civil War, but did not succeed. Because of his revolutionary activism Pindžurov was arrested by the Yugoslav authorities. After the annexation of Vardar banovina by Bulgaria during the World War II, he clashed with the pro-Bulgarian secretary of the Regional Committee of Communists in Macedonia — Metodi Shatorov Sharlo. With the help of the Comintern, the Macedonian Communists were re-attached to the Communist Party of Yugoslavia. As a CPY-loyalist he was appointed as member of the new Regional Committee and a member of the Main headquarters of the partisan detachments in December 1942. However the same month he was captured by the Bulgarian police. According to the statement of the head of Group 4 at the Skopje District Police Department, Lyubomir Yordanov, Pindžurov was beaten continually for two straight days with a rubber baton, all over his body and across the soles of his feet, however Pindžurov kept silent for the duration of the interrogation. He succumbed to his injuries on January 4, 1943.
