= Vranac =

Montenegrin variety of grape

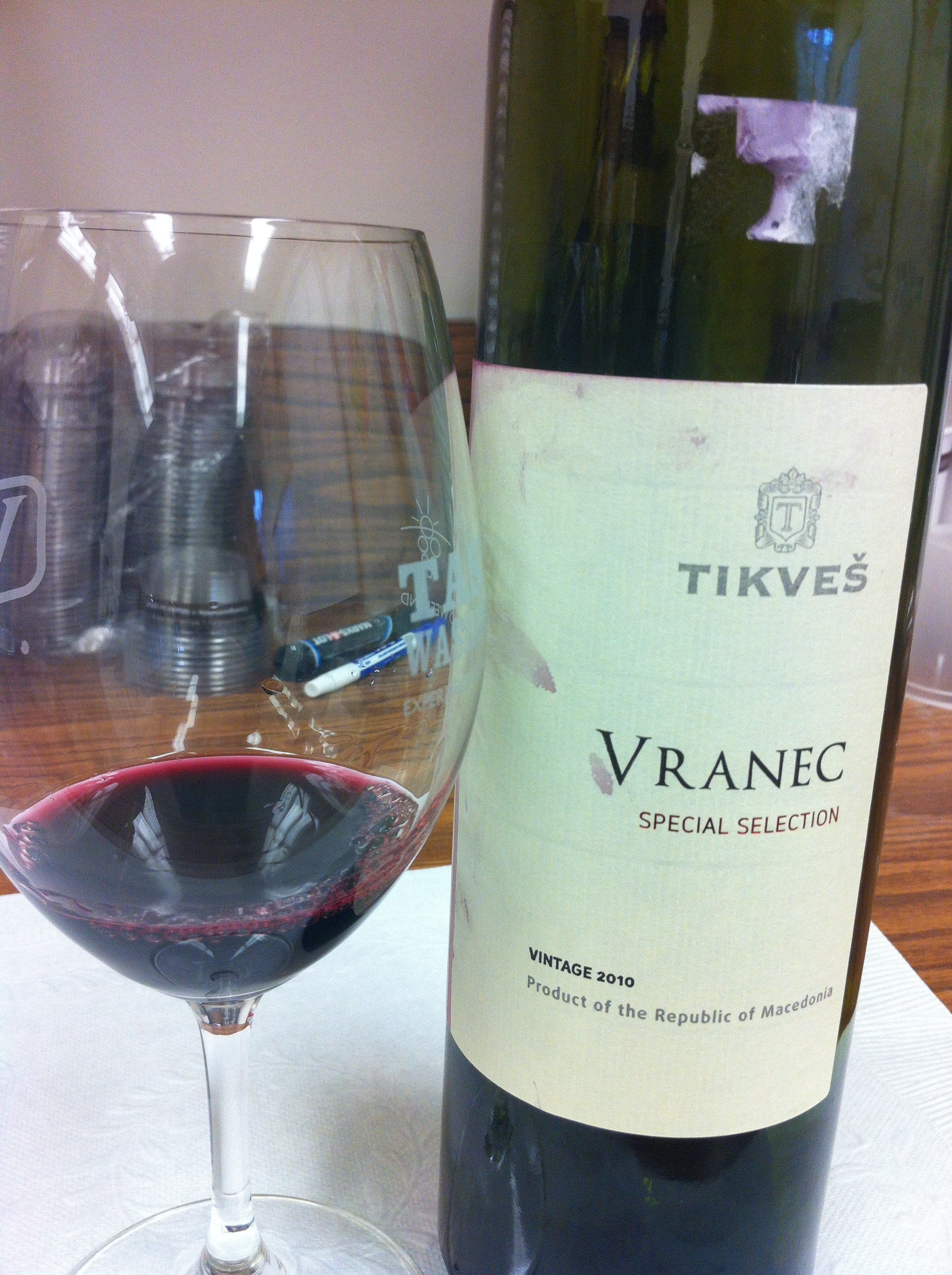
A Vranec from North Macedonia

Vranac (pronounced [ʋrǎːnats]), Serbian Cyrillic: Вранац; Macedonian: Вранец, romanized: Vranec) is a red grape variety that originates from Montenegro. It is the most planted grape variety in Montenegro. It is believed to be closely related to Kratosija. Vranac is considered the most important grape variety in Montenegro and one of the most important in North Macedonia. It is also grown in regions of Dalmatia (in Croatia), Herzegovina, Kosovo and south Serbia. It has been protected as a Montenegrin geographical indication of origin since 1977. The single largest producer is Plantaže, based in the Montenegrin capital Podgorica, with Vranac planted on about two thirds of 2,300 hectares of vineyards in the Ćemovsko polje near Podgorica. Other major producers include Macedonian Tikveš and Stobi.

Vranac berries are large and deeply colored, with its dark berries growing on moderately vigorous and very productive vines. The fruit is harvested by hand. Depending on the area, this harvest can begin from mid-September and continue into October.

Young Vranac wines have a bright purple hue and a nose full of red berries and fruit jams. Its firm tannin structure provides crispness and richness, with medium to high levels of extraction and acidity. After a year or two of aging, the purple develops into an intense dark ruby and the nose develops a more complex aroma that can include hints of cinnamon, chocolate, liquorice, flowers, black fruits, herbs and even woods such as oak. The taste is subtle, round, and full. It loses its sharpness and develops a longer and smoother finish.
