= Elpida Karamandi =

Aromanian Yugoslav partisan

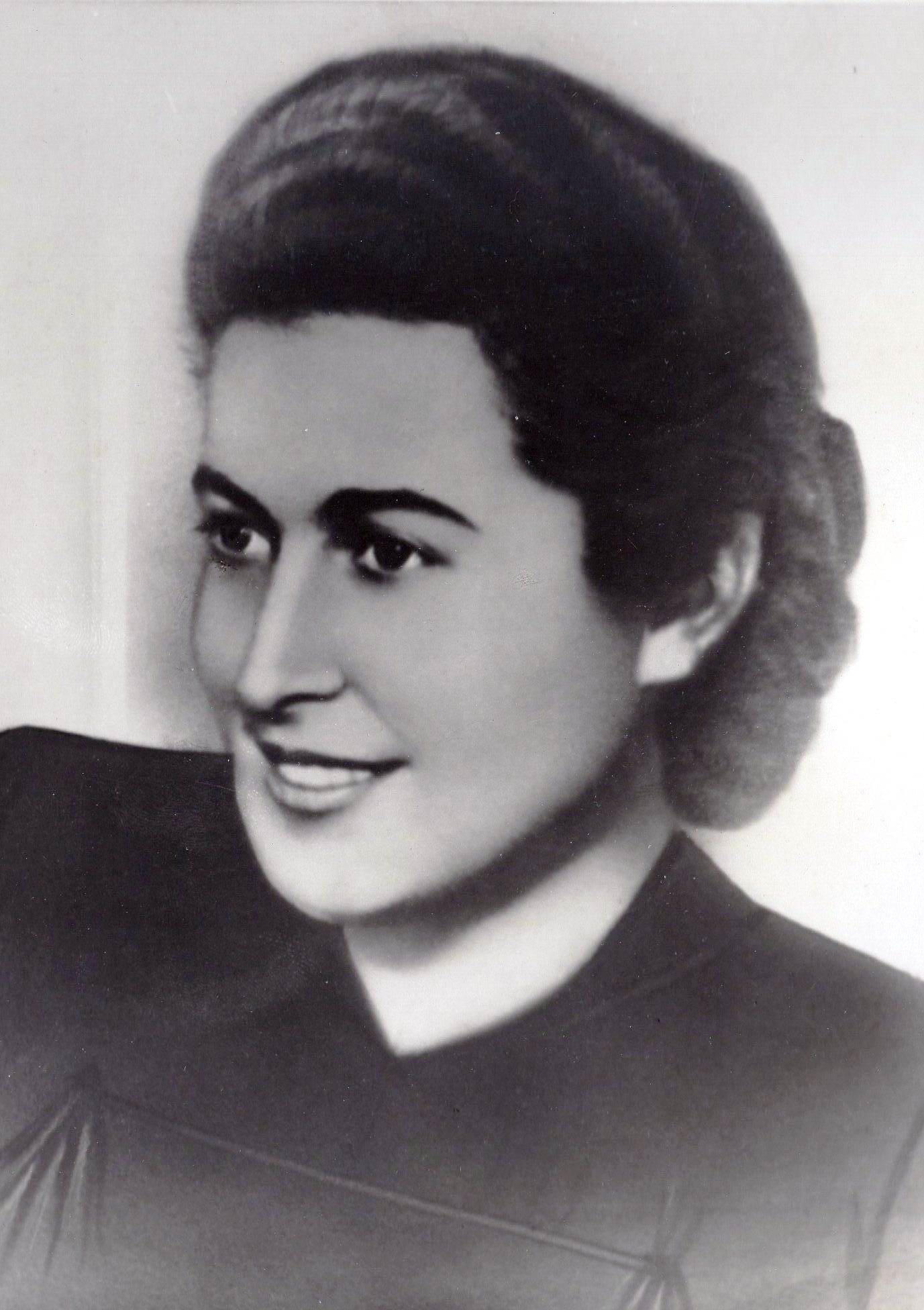
Elpida Karamandi

Elpida Karamandi (Aromanian: Elpida Caramandi, Macedonian: Елпида Караманди) was an Aromanian Yugoslav partisan and resistance fighter.

She was born on 1 January 1920, in Florina, Greece, in an Aromanian family. Her mother was divorced from her husband and moved to her relatives in Bitola, then in the Kingdom of Yugoslavia, where she remarried. Karamandi grew up and was educated in Bitola and later continued her studies in Belgrade, where she became a member of SKOJ in 1939. When the Second World War began, Karamandi came back to Bitola. In June 1941, she joined the Yugoslav Communist Party, but her activities were detected by the Bulgarian police and she was arrested. On her release she resumed her resistance work against the occupiers.

In April 1942, she left Bitola and joined the First Bitola Partisan detachment. On 3 May 1942, the detachment was surrounded by the Bulgarian police. Heavily wounded, Elpida Karamandi was captured, and later died in Bulgarian captivity after being tortured. She was declared a Yugoslav national hero on 11 October 1951.

== Legacy ==
In 1984, Yugoslavia honoured Karamandi with a stamp as part of a series of national heroes of Yugoslavia. A bust of her was erected in Gradski park in Bitola, along with a street that was named after her.

- Elpida Karamandi Primary School in Bitola, North Macedonia (established 1980)
