= Vozarci =

Vozarci Возарци
- Village
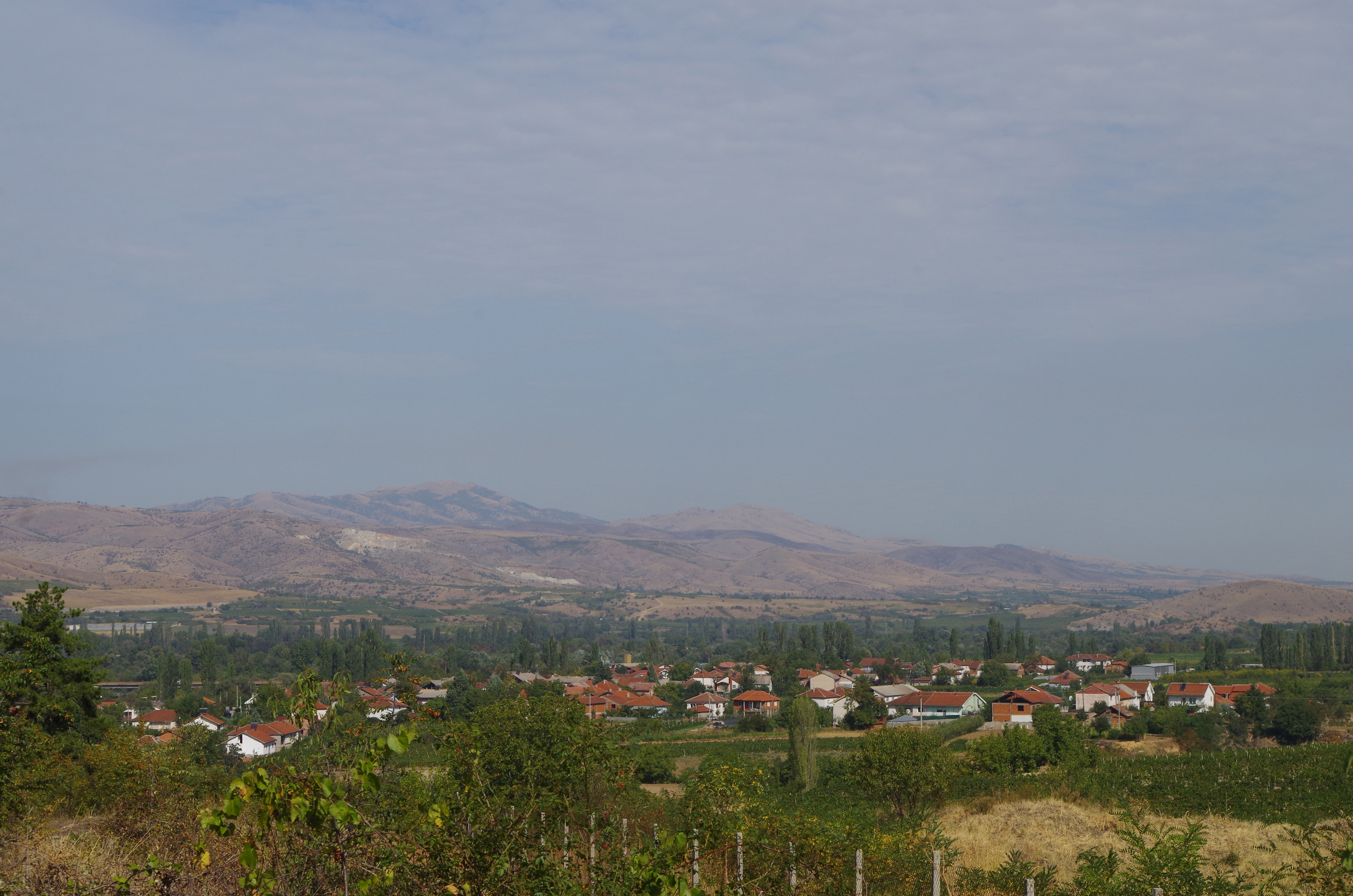
- View of the village

- Location within North Macedonia
- Coordinates: 41.429032°N 21.924351°E
- Country: North Macedonia
- Region: Vardar
- Municipality: Kavadarci

Population (2021)
  - Total: 892
- Time zone: UTC+1 (CET)
  - Summer (DST): UTC+2 (CEST)

Vozarci (Macedonian: Возарци) is a village in the municipality of Kavadarci, North Macedonia.

== Demographics ==
According to the statistics of Bulgarian ethnographer Vasil Kanchov from 1900, 195 inhabitants lived in Vozarci, all Christian Bulgarians. According to the 2002 census, the village had a total of 910 inhabitants. Ethnic groups in the village include:

- Macedonians 904
- Serbs 5
- Others 1

According to the 2021 census, the village had a total of 892 inhabitants. Ethnic groups in the village include:

- Macedonians 821
- Serbs 1
- Others 1
- Persons for whom data are taken from administrative sources 69
