= Tikveš uprising =

1913 uprising in Tikveš

Tikvesh Uprisng
- Part of Balkan Wars
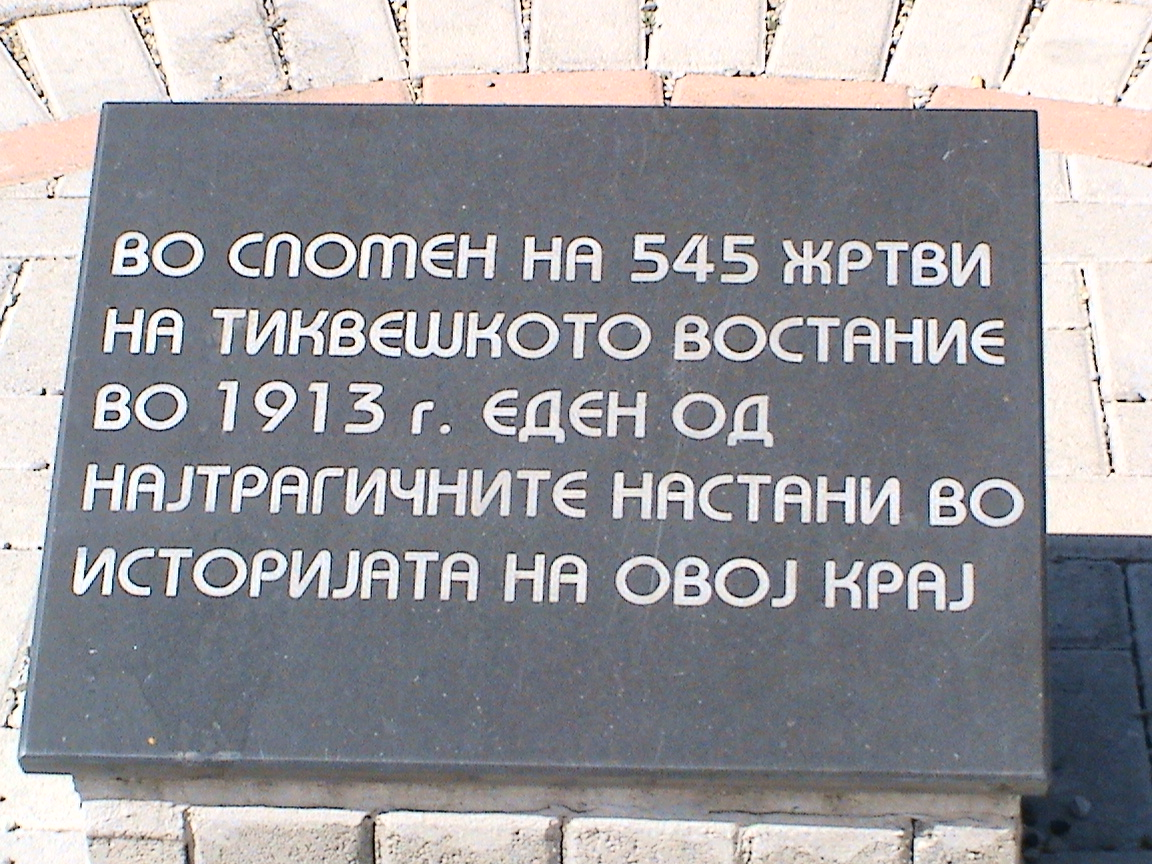
Date	19 June 1913 – 26 June 1913
Location	Vardar Macedonia, Kingdom of Serbia (now North Macedonia)
Result	Serbian Victory

Belligerents
IMRO	Serbia

Commanders and leaders
Doncho Lazarov; Mihail Shkaratov; Koce Seizov; Dime Pindzhurov; Todor Kamchev	(Kingdom of Serbia) Vasilije Trbić (Kingdom of Serbia) Jovan Babunski (Kingdom of Serbia) John Dolgach

Strength
1,000 peasants	(Kingdom of Serbia) 2500 – 3,000 Armed Soldiers

Tikvesh uprising (Bulgarian: Тиквешко въстание, romanized: Tikveshko vŭstanie; Macedonian: Тиквешко востание, romanized: Tikveško vostanie; Serbian: Тиквешки устанак / Tikveški ustanak) was an uprising in the Tikveš region of Macedonia in late June 1913.

It was organized by Internal Macedonian Revolutionary Organization (IMRO) against the Serbian troops in Vardar Macedonia between the First and the Second Balkan War. As the First Balkan War was coming to its final border arrangements, the pressures on the Bulgarian Exarchate and on the Macedonian Bulgarian ethnic community in the Ottoman areas that came under Greek and Serbian control were intensifying. According to the report of the International Commission on the Balkan Wars Serbia implemented there a program of "assimilation through terror". IMRO acted in close coordination with the Bulgarian army, which troops at the time were located on the left bank of the Vardar river. The rebellion started prematurely on June 15, 1913, after the secret uprising conspiracy had been revealed by the local Serbian authorities. The organisers had planned to start armed resistance against the oppressors after the Bulgarian Army had begun operations in the region.

The rebellion spread in the regions of Kavadarci, Negotino and the village of Vatasha. Two large rebel groups were set up with leaders Doncho Lazarov and Mishe Shkartov. Serbian army unit in Negotino was attacked and forced out from the town, Kavadarci and Vatasha were taken soon after. The rebellions set up a provisional Bulgarian government in these settlements. Reorganized Serbian army troops and irregulars led by Vasilije Trbić were sent to crush the uprising. On June 25, after realising that help from the Bulgarian army would not be coming soon, the rebels moved out from the towns. In the following days the Serbian army brutally suppressed the uprising and terrorized the Bulgarian population in the rebelling regions. According to some sources 363 civilian Bulgarians were killed in Kavadarci, 230 - in Negotino and 40 - in Vatasha. As result, Bulgaria, dissatisfied with the results of the First Balkan War, attacked its former allies, Serbia and Greece, on 29 June 1913 starting the Second Balkan War.

== Causes ==
The uprising was sparked by the violence perpetrated by the Serbian occupation authorities against the population during efforts to assimilate and subjugate. The Serbian authorities have made a public threat to the population that anyone who opposes the new government will be executed.

After the occupation, all Bulgarian teachers and priests were expelled, and teachers and priests from Serbia were brought in as replacements. The Serbian language was introduced in churches and schools. The terror of the authorities intensifies, and with it the revolt of the population grows more and more day by day, not only among the nobility, but also among the common people. The uprising was preceded by several events that particularly intensified the revolt. A boy, named Aleksandar Vidov, was killed simply because he said he did not feel like a Serb. A young bride from Vatasha was raped by Serbian lieutenant Milan Kreković shortly after her wedding. An entire Turkish family of about 50 members, including children, was killed.

== Course ==
With the support of IMRO, an assembly was convened with delegates from almost all the seats in Tikvešia. At the assembly, it was unanimously decided to start an uprising and an insurgent headquarters was created, consisting of prominent dukes from that region who had participated in the Ilinden Uprising, among whom were: Doncho Lazarov, Mihail Shkaratov, Koce Seizov, Dime Pindzhurov, Todor Kamchev and others. The number of insurgents is about 1,000, of whom 200 are ordinary citizens who take a rifle in their hand, and the rest are comites of IMARO bands.

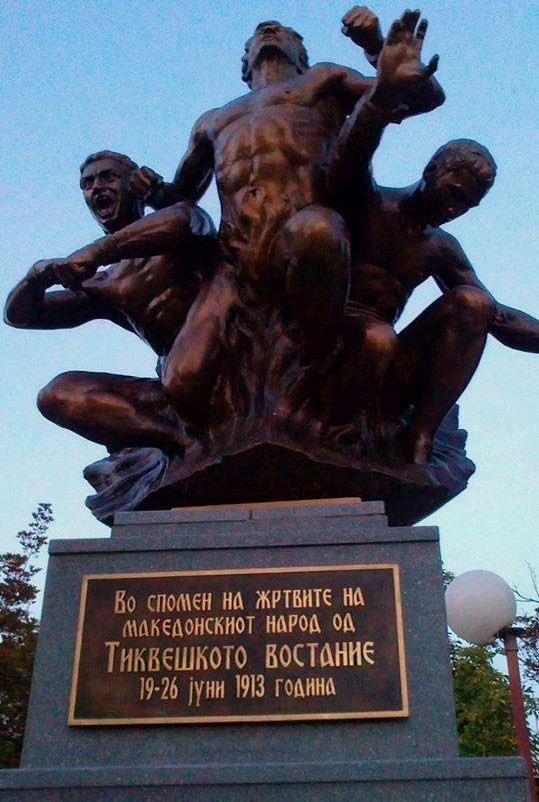
Monument of Tikvesh Uprising

The uprising began on 19 June 1913, and in addition to Negotino and Kavadarci, fifty villages in the Tikvesh region were taken. The detachments of Doncho Lazarov and Mihail Shkartov attacked and expelled the Serbian armies from Negotino. The Serbian authorities sent bands from the surrounding villages to Negotino, but they were all defeated. The insurgents proceeded further and managed to expel the Serb clerks and scribes from the municipal building in Kavadarci and, taking down the Serbian flag, placed it on the Tikvesh Revolutionary Flag. On 20 June, a solemn assembly was held, at which the city government consisting of 12 prominent Kavadarians was elected, and the freedom lasted only 7 days.

== Suppression ==
After seven days, the Serbs sent a large army led by Vasilije Trbić, as well as Jovan Babunski and Jovan Dolgač. To the aid of the Serbian army came the bashi-bazouk of Yaya Agha with 250 armed men. The Tikvesh rebels, along with the detachments of dukes Hristo Chernopeev and Petar Chaulev were left alone to face the Serbian army, but failed in their efforts. About 1,000 people died in the uprising, of whom about 500 are known for certain, among whom many men, women, children and the elderly were killed, slaughtered and burned alive.

== See also ==
- Kresna–Razlog uprising
- Ilinden–Preobrazhenie Uprising
- Ohrid–Debar uprising
