= Kavadarci =

Kavadarci Кавадарци (Macedonian)
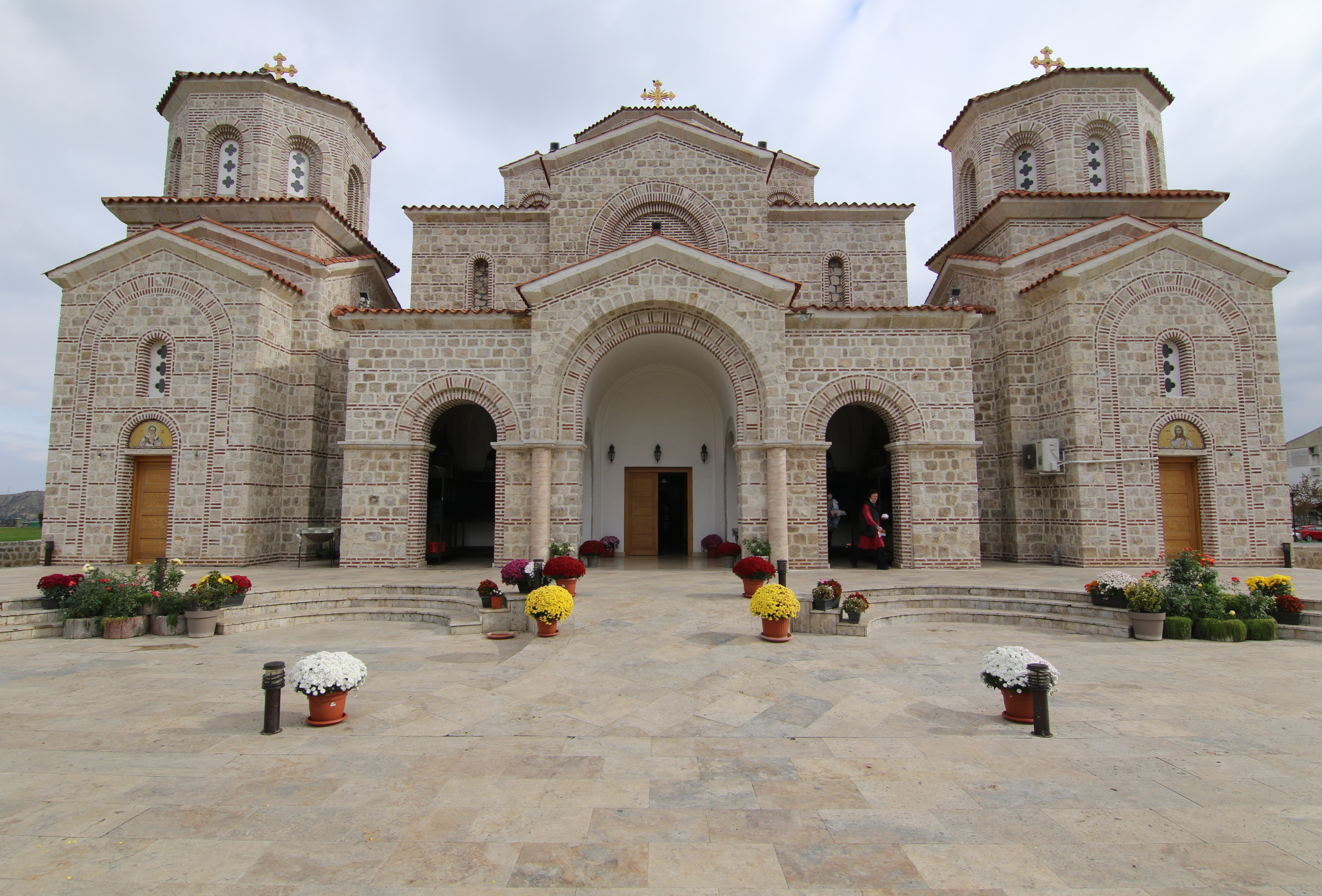
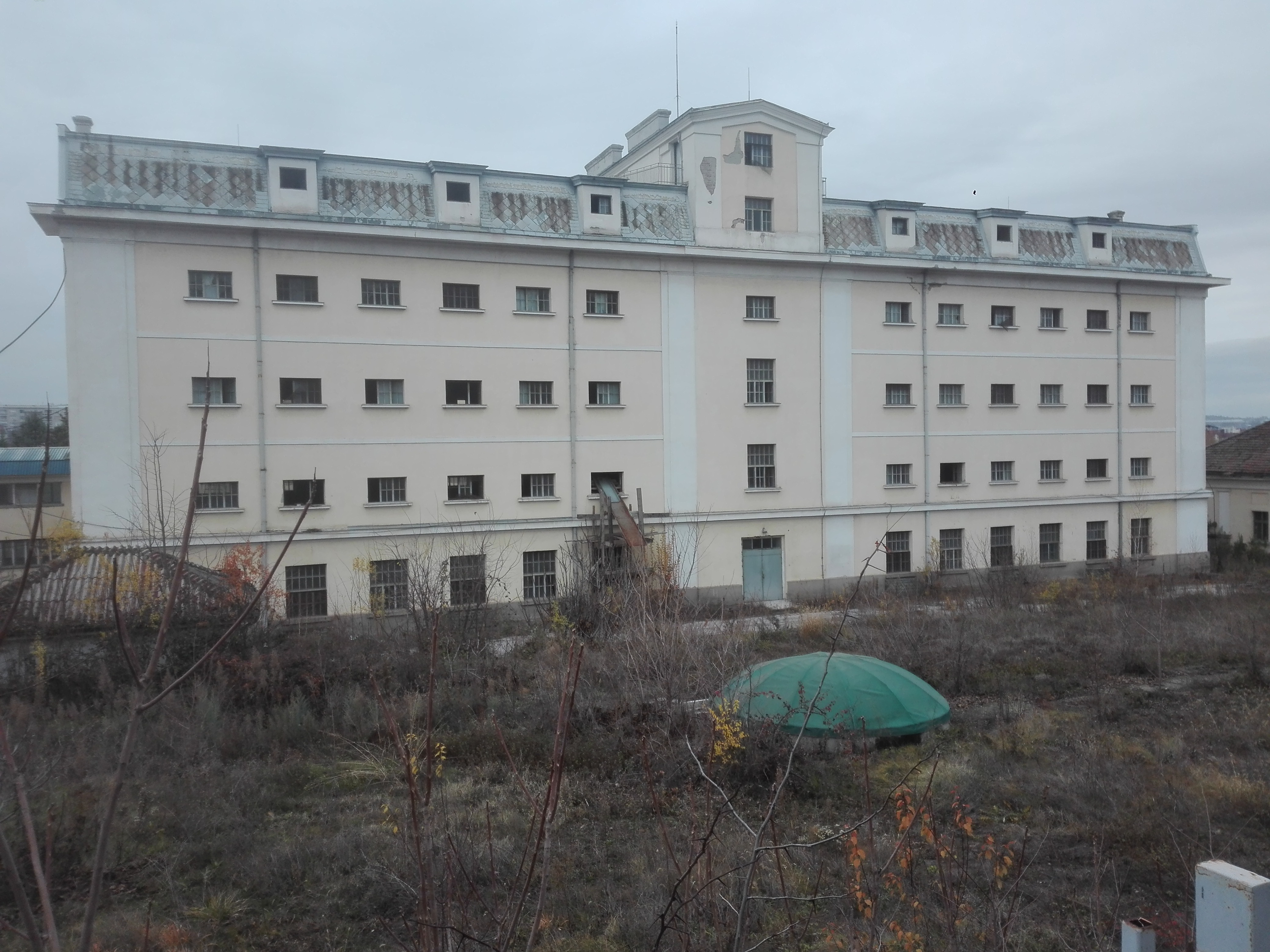
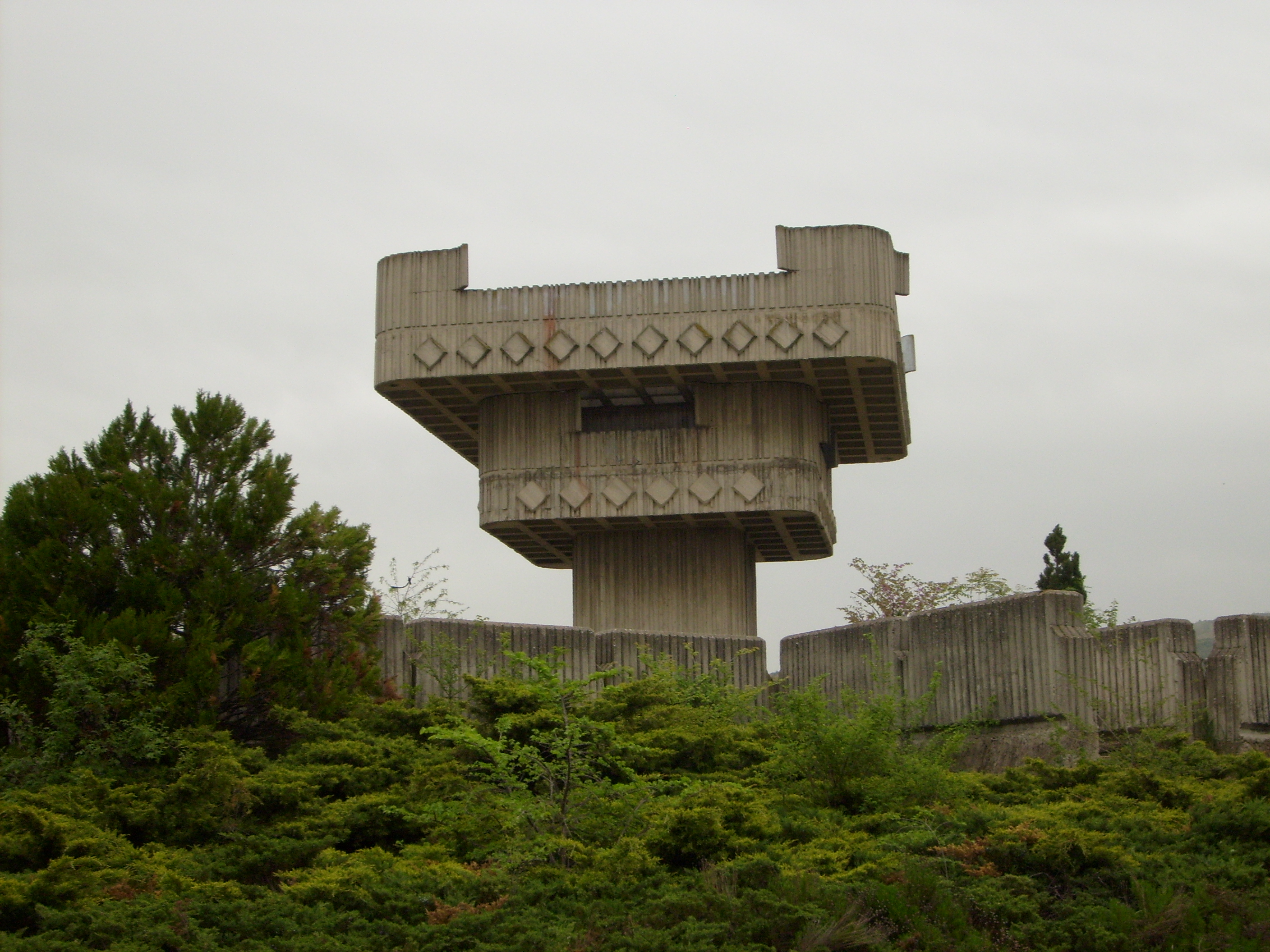
- From the top, Church of St. Petka, Former Tabacco Factory, The Ossuary Monument

- Flag Coat of arms

- Location within North Macedonia
- Coordinates: 41°26′N 22°00′E
- Country: North Macedonia
- Region: Vardar
- Municipality: Kavadarci

Government
  - Mayor: Mitko Janchev (VMRO-DPMNE)
- Elevation: 250 m (820 ft)
- Highest elevation: 270 m (890 ft)
- Lowest elevation: 230 m (750 ft)

Population (2021)
  - Total: 32,038
- Time zone: UTC+1 (CET)
  - Summer (DST): UTC+2 (CEST)
- Postal code: 1430
- Area code: +389 043
- Vehicle registration: KA
- Climate: Cfa
- Website: www.kavadarci.gov.mk/

Kavadarci (Macedonian: Кавадарци [kaˈvadartsi]) is a town in the Tikveš region of North Macedonia. In the heart of North Macedonia's wine country, it is home to the largest winery in Southeast Europe, named after the Tikveš plain. The town of Kavadarci is the seat of Kavadarci Municipality. Situated near Kavadarci is North Macedonia's largest artificial lake, Lake Tikveš.

== History ==
=== Classical period ===
In the Tikveš region around Kavadarci, many artefacts and structures have been discovered dating back to prehistoric times. Bronze and ceramic artefacts were discovered at an archaeological site in the nearby town of Stobi (Macedonian: Стоби) dating to the 6th and 7th century BC. This town is said to have been established during the Hellenic period; being on the main road of Via Egnatia that led from the Danube to the Aegean Sea meant it became an important military, economic and cultural hub. The establishment of a mint during the Roman period aided in its prosperity and achieving the status of municipium, denars and coins reading “Municipium Stobensium” were also produced in this area. Numerous buildings and monuments of this era such as a theatre have been discovered. A Jewish community is said to have existed in Stobi during the 3rd century, however, its synagogue was torn down in the 4th century and a Christian basilica was built in its place. In the late 5th and early 6th century, the town was devastated in the great Avaro-Slavonic invasions. Stobi which was previously the centre of this region was replaced by the new village of Dukena.

=== Ottoman Empire ===
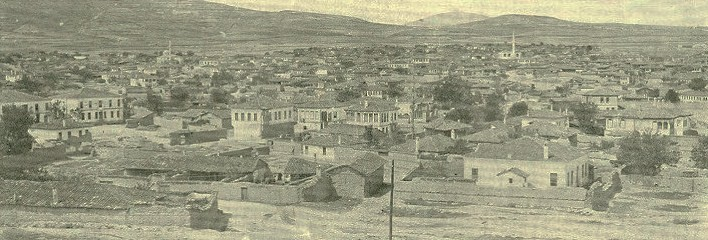
Kavadarci – early 20th century

Much change took place during the occupation of the Ottoman Empire in the 14th century; the occupying Ottomans destroyed all existing villages replacing them with oriental architecture. Villagers from Rashtani and Dukena fleeing from the Ottomans settled in a new area, bringing with them many families that exist in Kavadarci today. From this settlement a new village emerged. During the 17th century this growing village attracted much attention and spurred a large migration of people from the surrounding hills and villages, establishing the new town called Kavadarci.

Kavadarci was under the jurisdiction of Bitola's area Pashaluk (Ottoman military territorial unit controlled by a Pasha). With the Turkish majority, many beys residences and several mosques were built throughout the town. By this time Kavadarci had been firmly established as the new centre of the Tikveš region. During the period of Bulgarian National Revival, a Bulgarian church municipality functioned in the town.

After the forming of the Bulgarian Macedonian-Adrianople Revolutionary Committee by Dame Gruev in 1894 and the Ilinden-Preobrazhenie Uprising many revolutionary troops operated in the Tikveš area, working with the aim of autonomy for Macedonia and Adrianople regions.

=== 20th century ===
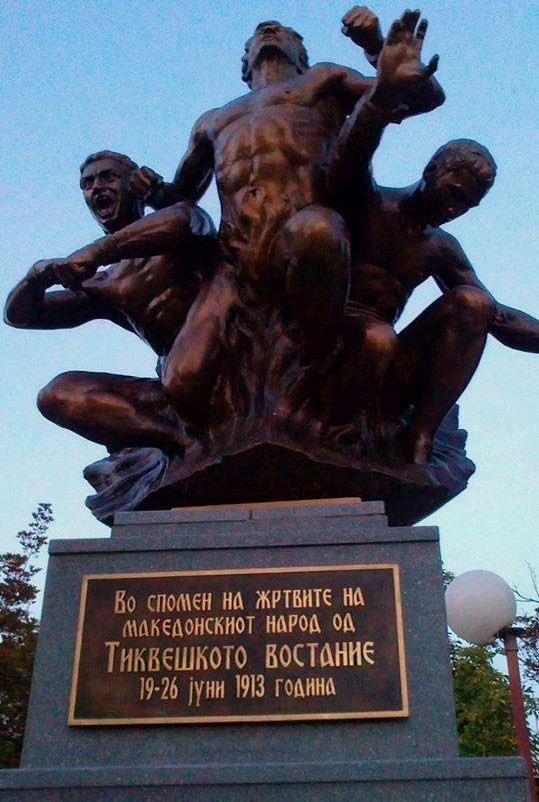
Monument in memory of victims of the Tikveš Uprising, 19–26 June 1913

During this period Kavadarci flourished, becoming a large economic, administrative and political center in the Tikveš area.

In June 1913, the Tikveš Uprising took place against the Serbian occupational forces. The resistance fighters freed the majority of the Tikveš region, including the towns of Kavadarci, Negotino, Vataša, and several small villages. Serbian military forces killed approximately 1,200 people and burnt more than 1,000 homes. Most of the Turks fled to Turkey. Recep Vardarlı moved to Turkey and founded Tikveşli ("Came from Tikveş" in Turkish) company, which produces yogurt and ayran, in 1943. The firm was sold to Danone in 1998.

From 1929 to 1941, Kavadarci was part of the Vardar Banovina of the Kingdom of Yugoslavia. There was strong resistance against the Serbian occupation.

During the Second World War, after the defeat of Yugoslavia by Germany in April 1941 and before the entry of Bulgarian troops in Vardar Macedonia a local Bulgarian Action Committee was formed in Kavadarci. The town was under Bulgarian rule until September 1944.

"Between 2011 and 2012, the number of cancer diagnoses in Kavadarci and the surrounding villages rose significantly, from 981 to 1,332. According to the local medical clinic, pediatric cancers are also on the rise." In 2012, "there were 17 children under the age of six diagnosed with cancer."

== Municipality of Kavadarci ==
The Municipality of Kavadarci spreads from the central region of Povardarie to the highlands of Vitačevo (Macedonian: Витачевo) and is located next to the Crna Reka (The Black River) (Macedonian: Црна Река) and the River Vardar (Macedonian: Вардар). Covering a large area in the Tikveš valley with a total ground surface of 391 km^{2} (151 sq mi), it comprises 31 settlements, the largest of these being Vataša (Macedonian: Ваташа).

Villages in the Municipality of Kavardarci
Rožden (Рожден)	Šeškovo (Шешково)	Vataša (Ваташа)	Vozarci (Возарци)
Galište (Галиште)	Garnikovo (Гарниково)	Glišić (Глишиќ)	Grbovec (Грбовец)
Dabnište (Дабниште)	Dobrotino (Добротино)	Dragožel (Драгожел)	Dradnja (Драдња)
Drenovo (Дреново)	Kjesendre (Ќесендре)	Košani (Кошани)	Marena (Марена)
Pravednik (Праведник)	Raec (Раец)	Resava (Ресава)	Sopot (Сопот)
Fariš (Фариш)	Begnište (Бегниште)	Šivec (Шивец)	Brušani (Брушани)
Radnja (Радња)	Klinovo (Клиново)	Kamen Dol (Камен Дол)	Mrzen Oraovec (Мрзен Ораовец)
Konopište (Конопиште)	Mrežičko (Мрежичко)	Majden (Мајден)	

=== Demographics ===
Population of 38,741 according to the 2002 census.
97% Macedonians	1% Roma	0.5% Serbs	1.5% other ethnicities

=== Media ===
Two TV, two radio stations and one official web site operate in Kavadarci: They are KTV 41 and TVT, Radio Galaxy FM and Radio Kavadarci FM, and www.kavadar4e.com. All five are privately owned.

== Politics ==
Since 2017, local elections were held on 15 October 2017, on 29 October 2017, and on 17 October 2021. Mitko Janchev won the elections and became the Mayor of Kavadarci.

== Industry ==
=== Wine ===
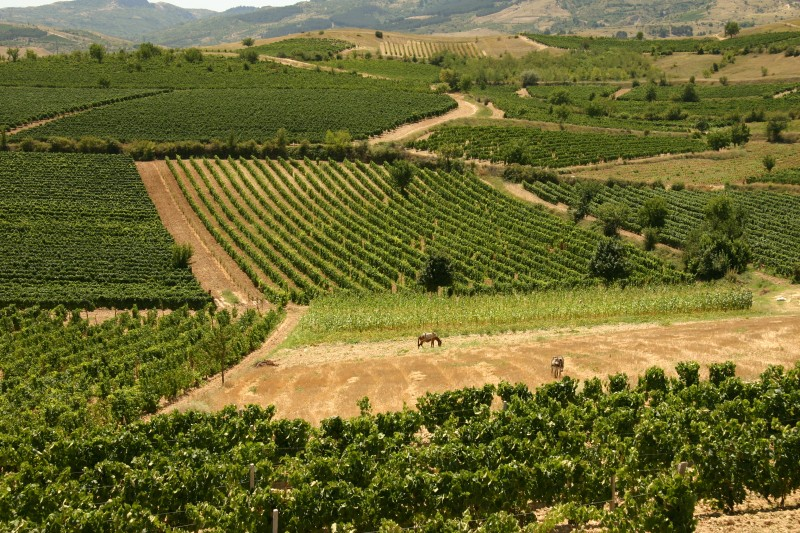
Vineyards near Kavadarci

Kavadarci's most famous export is wine, the city being home to the largest winery in south-eastern Europe. Vineyards in the region cover a total area of 120 square kilometres (46 sq mi), producing up to 85,000 tons of grapes annually. The Tikveš winery is one of the oldest wineries in North Macedonia processing up to 55 million kilograms of grapes to produce approximately 35 million litres of wine each year. Of the 38,000 citizens, it is estimated that up to 85% are involved with the growing of grapes.

The tradition of wine making and grape growing in the Tikveš region date as far back as the 4th century BC. The industry thrived during medieval times with its production as was common at the time throughout Europe ,being made in monasteries.

The Tikveš region is in an area with a unique and favourable climate produced by the merging of the Mediterranean from the south and Continental from the north. Combined with arable soil, with eroded clay content makes this an area to grow grapes.

The combined municipalities of Kavadarci and Rosoman use 20% of North Macedonia’s total landmass (5,142 km^{2} or 1,985 sq mi) for the cultivation of grapes. The country is the seventh largest exporter of wine to the EU from outside the region. Of the total harvested crop in Kavadarci, 80% are wine grapes and 20% are table grapes. The Tikveš winery processes up to 55 million km of grapes to produce approximately 35 million litres of wine each year. Although the largest and most prolific, Tikveš is by no means the only winery in the city: Others include Chekorovi (Macedonian: Чекоров) and Popov (Macedonian: Попов). The combined wineries in the region export up to 26 countries.

The Tikveš winery logo

Examples of alcoholic beverages produced in the Tikveš region
Red wine	White wine	Spirits	Speciality wines
T'ga za Jug (Yearning for the South)	Smederevka	Yellow Lozova Rakija	Rosé
Alexandria	Riesling	White Lozova Rakija	
Kratošija (Кртошиа)	Chardonnay	Brandy	
Teran	Temjanika	Vinjak	
Krater	Sauvignon blanc	Whisky	
Cabernet Sauvignon	Semijon		
Poema	Belan		
Kavadarka	Altan		
Kanvas	Riesling		
Millennium	Žilavka		
Vitač	Alexandria		
Vranec	Traminec		
Pinot noir			
Merlot
Stanušina

=== Ferronickel smelter ===
Another important industry is the manufacture of ferronickel in what has become known as the "Nickel Valley". Until 2013, the smelter received at least part of its input ore from the Ržanovo mine, to which it was connected by the world's longest conveyor belt. The company FENI Industries, with a colourful history of owners that included for a time Beny Steinmetz, Alexander Mashkevich, Patokh Chodiev and Alijan Ibragimov in the Cunico Resources vehicle, produced between 12000 and 16000 tons of ferronickel annually. The smelter was shut down for a time in around 2018 and re-emerged from a court-administered insolvency process as EuroNickel Industries.

=== Free Economic Zone ===
In a bid to attract more interest from domestic and foreign investors in 2000 the first Free Economic Zone (FEZ) of North Macedonia was founded in Kavadarci. German company DRÄXLMAIER Group was the first investor in the FEZ (Free Economic Zone) with the opening of their first plant in 2012. The plant manufactures electrical system sets for the automotive industry. The factory is the largest employer in the city, with the current employee count reaching above 5000 employees.

=== Tobacco ===
Kavadarci is known for its timber and tobacco production. Alliance One Macedonia, one of the largest tobacco processing companies in North Macedonia is located in Kavadarci, producing and exporting Macedonian Oriental tobacco to the United States, Japan, and selected EU and Asian countries.

== Main sights ==
=== Tikveški Grozdober ===
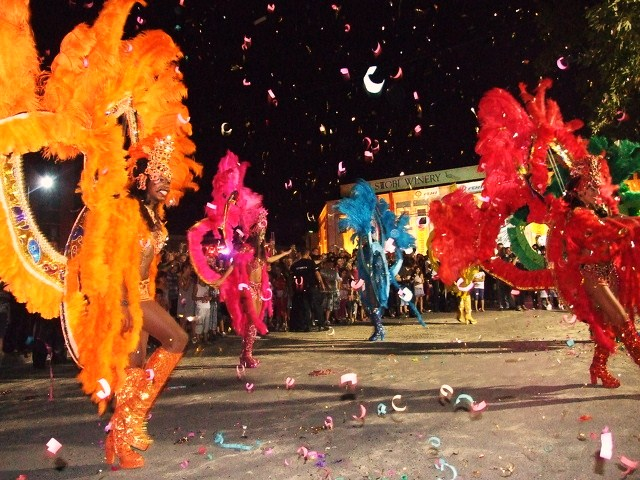
A Tikveški Grozdober parade participants

In the first week of September of each year a festival called "Tikveški Grozdober" (Тиквешки гроздобер, lit. Tikveš grape picking) is held for several days, marking the beginning of the wine grape harvest in the Tikveš region and commemorating the liberation of Kavadarci. Such is the importance of this fruit, the city flag is composed of six circles in white and red representing the town's most abundant and important produce.

Tikveški Grozdober officially began in 1964. It takes place over several days and is one of the largest cultural manifestations of its kind in the region.

The festival includes folk, pop and rock concerts, traditional dancing, seminars, presentations and exhibitions. During this time the city centre houses many temporary restaurants, stalls and shops open to allow visitors to experience the smells and tastes of local delicacies. It culminates in a carnival procession through the main streets of the town.

=== Lake Tikveš ===
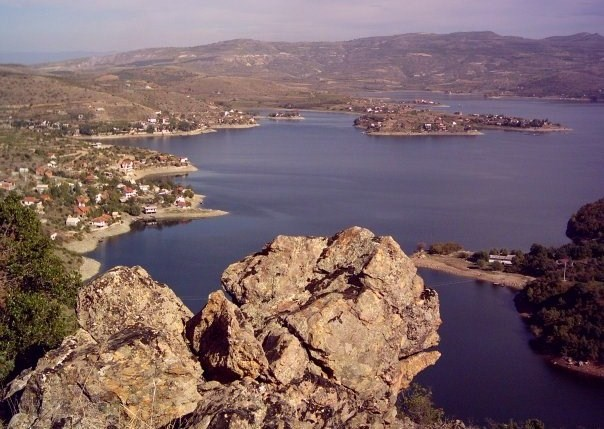
Lake Tikveš near Kavadarci

Lake Tikveš (Macedonian: Тиквешко Езеро) is the largest artificial lake in North Macedonia. It is located 165 metres (541 feet) above sea level, 8 kilometres (5.0 miles) southwest of Kavadarci on the Crna Reka, and 3 kilometres (1.9 miles) from the village of Vozarci. The lake was built in 1968 by redirecting river water and building a 104-metre (341-foot) high dam. It has a surface area of approximately 14 square kilometres (5.4 square miles), a length of 28.5 kilometres (17.7 miles) and width of 500 metres (1,600 feet). The average temperature of the water is 24 °C (75 °F), the maximum depth is 150 m (492 ft), and the total volume is approximately 475 cubic metres (16,800 cubic feet). Its two main sources of water are the Crna Reka and the Dragov River.

The artificial accumulation is provides water to the local area for businesses such as irrigation and fisheries. It generates electricity through the use of a hydro power plant (HPP), is a site for sports and recreation, and is a popular tourist attraction due to the cultural monuments and rich flora and fauna of the area.

The area around Lake Tikveš has been designated a protected zone; this was established and supported as a conservation project for the protection of the wildlife and surrounding environment by a local environmental association ODEK and a public enterprise Tikveško Pole.

=== Tikveš Strict Natural Reserve ===
Established in 1997, the Tikveš Strict Natural Reserve is 30 km (19 mi) southeast of Kavadarci and covers an area of approximately 100 square kilometres (40 sq mi). Some 23 species of predatory birds are present in the reserve and of these 17 nest in this area. It is said to be one of the most important ornithological sites in Europe.

=== Pološki Monastery and Church of St. Bogorodica of Drenovo ===
The Pološki Monastery was built in the 14th century by a father and a son from Prespa (Macedonian: Преспа), well known for building monasteries and churches across Macedonia. The pair set to work with the son building a church in Drenovo (Macedonian: Дреново) and the father the Pološki Monastery (Macedonian: Полошки Манастир). After the father had completed construction of the Pološki Monastery he returned to Drenovo.

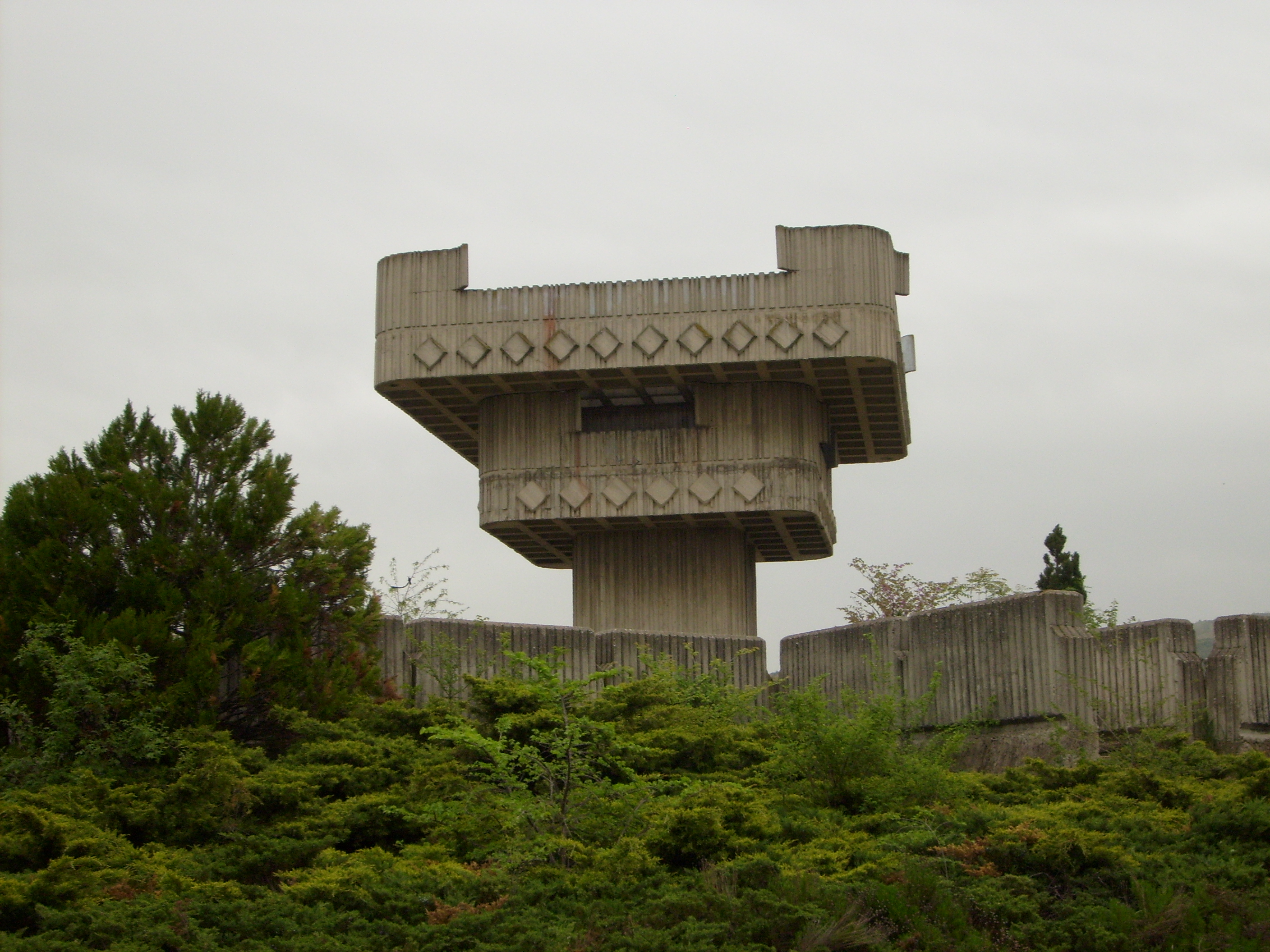
The ossuary monument in Kavadarci

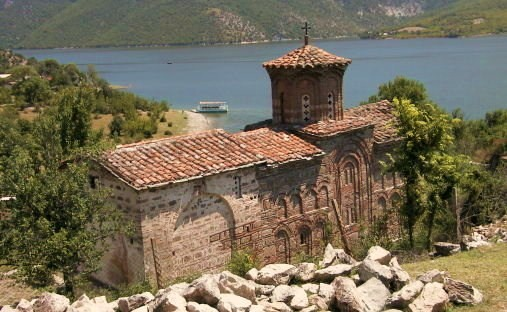
Pološki Monastery

The vanity and arrogance of the son made him claim that the church he built was so beautiful and so well made that even if Saint Ilija came down from the heavens he would not be able to destroy it. At that moment a lightning bolt appeared out of the blue sky: Saint Ilija angered by this claim split the new church in half. It is said that if the break is repaired, each year on the day of Ilinden (Macedonian: Илинден), August 2 (St. Elijah's Day) the church will split in the exactly same place.

The church within the Pološki Monastery is dedicated to Sveti Gorgija (Saint George) and is on the southwestern shore of Lake Tikveš that is accessible only by boat. Its fresco paintings are completely preserved and can be dated to the 14th century; the only exception being those in the narthex that was built during the 17th century. The most recent and last restoration to the building took place during the 19th century. The monastery is well known for its collections of unique icons, wood carvings and especially for its fresco art that differ from others of the same period due to its unusual compositions.

=== Marko’s Tower ===
Marko's Tower is a stone edifice located in the centre of Kavadarci; it was erected during the 18th century. The square structure stands at approximately 20 metres (66 feet) with five stories. Its walls are ten metres (33 feet) thick, with three windows on the fourth and fifth floor. The only entrance is by the door on the second floor, accessible via a stone staircase. On the south wall of the fourth floor remains an opening that was used for defence; the opening on the fifth floor was to dispose of dirty water.

=== Ivan Mazov-Klime House of Culture ===
The Ivan Mazov-Klime House of Culture was founded in 1952 and formed an ensemble in 1953. The Tikveš Folk Ensemble is composed of 115 members and performs choreographed folk songs and dances throughout the country and abroad.

=== City Museum and Gallery ===
Built in 1973 and opened to the public in 1976, the City Museum houses many historical, archaeological and cultural exhibits. The gallery showcases work from local and international artists, organising five to eight exhibitions each year.

== Sport ==
Kavadarci is the home of several sports teams. The best known are:

- a professional football club named GFK Tikveš
- a basketball team formerly known as KK Feni Industries, since 2019 known as KK EuroNickel 2005
- a handball club named GRK Tikveš

GFK Tikveš play their home matches at Gradski Stadion Kavadarci, while KK Euronickel and GRK Tikveš use the multi-purpose indoor Jasmin Sports Hall.

== Climate ==
Kavadarci has a humid subtropical climate (Köppen climate classification: Cfa).

Climate data for Kavadarci
Month	Jan	Feb	Mar	Apr	May	Jun	Jul	Aug	Sep	Oct	Nov	Dec	Year
Mean daily maximum °C (°F)	4.8 (40.6)	8.2 (46.8)	13.1 (55.6)	17.8 (64.0)	22.9 (73.2)	27.7 (81.9)	30.3 (86.5)	30.0 (86.0)	26.4 (79.5)	19.6 (67.3)	12.2 (54.0)	6.1 (43.0)	18.3 (64.9)
Daily mean °C (°F)	1.5 (34.7)	3.9 (39.0)	7.9 (46.2)	12.0 (53.6)	16.8 (62.2)	20.8 (69.4)	23.1 (73.6)	22.6 (72.7)	19.5 (67.1)	13.9 (57.0)	7.7 (45.9)	2.7 (36.9)	12.7 (54.9)
Mean daily minimum °C (°F)	−1.9 (28.6)	−0.8 (30.6)	2.7 (36.9)	6.3 (43.3)	10.7 (51.3)	14.0 (57.2)	15.7 (60.3)	15.3 (59.5)	12.1 (53.8)	8.2 (46.8)	3.2 (37.8)	−0.7 (30.7)	7.1 (44.7)
Average precipitation mm (inches)	34 (1.3)	33 (1.3)	36 (1.4)	39 (1.5)	57 (2.2)	43 (1.7)	33 (1.3)	29 (1.1)	33 (1.3)	45 (1.8)	55 (2.2)	43 (1.7)	480 (18.8)
Source: Climate-Data.org

== People from Kavadarci ==
Notable people from Kavadarci include:

- Andon Dončevski, former football coach
- Petar Angelov, handball player
- Stojan Andov, politician
- Strašo Pindžur, communist revolutionary
- Todor Gečevski, basketball player
- Vanče Šikov, footballer
- Vrbica Stefanov, former basketball player
- Zafir Hadžimanov, singer and composer
- Petar Mazev, academic painter
- Tome Hadzi-Vasilev, footballer, ex director of FK Tikves

== Twin towns – sister cities ==
Kavadarci is twinned with:

- Boljevac, Serbia
- Bucha, Ukraine
- Dobrich, Bulgaria
- Gornji Milanovac, Serbia
- Kemalpaşa, Turkey
- Kovin, Serbia
- Makarska, Croatia
- Năsăud, Romania
- Panagyurishte, Bulgaria
- Pernik, Bulgaria
- Pleven, Bulgaria
- Rožaje, Montenegro
- Yiwu, People's Republic of China

== See also ==
- Allchar deposit
