= Tikveš plain =

Region in North Macedonia

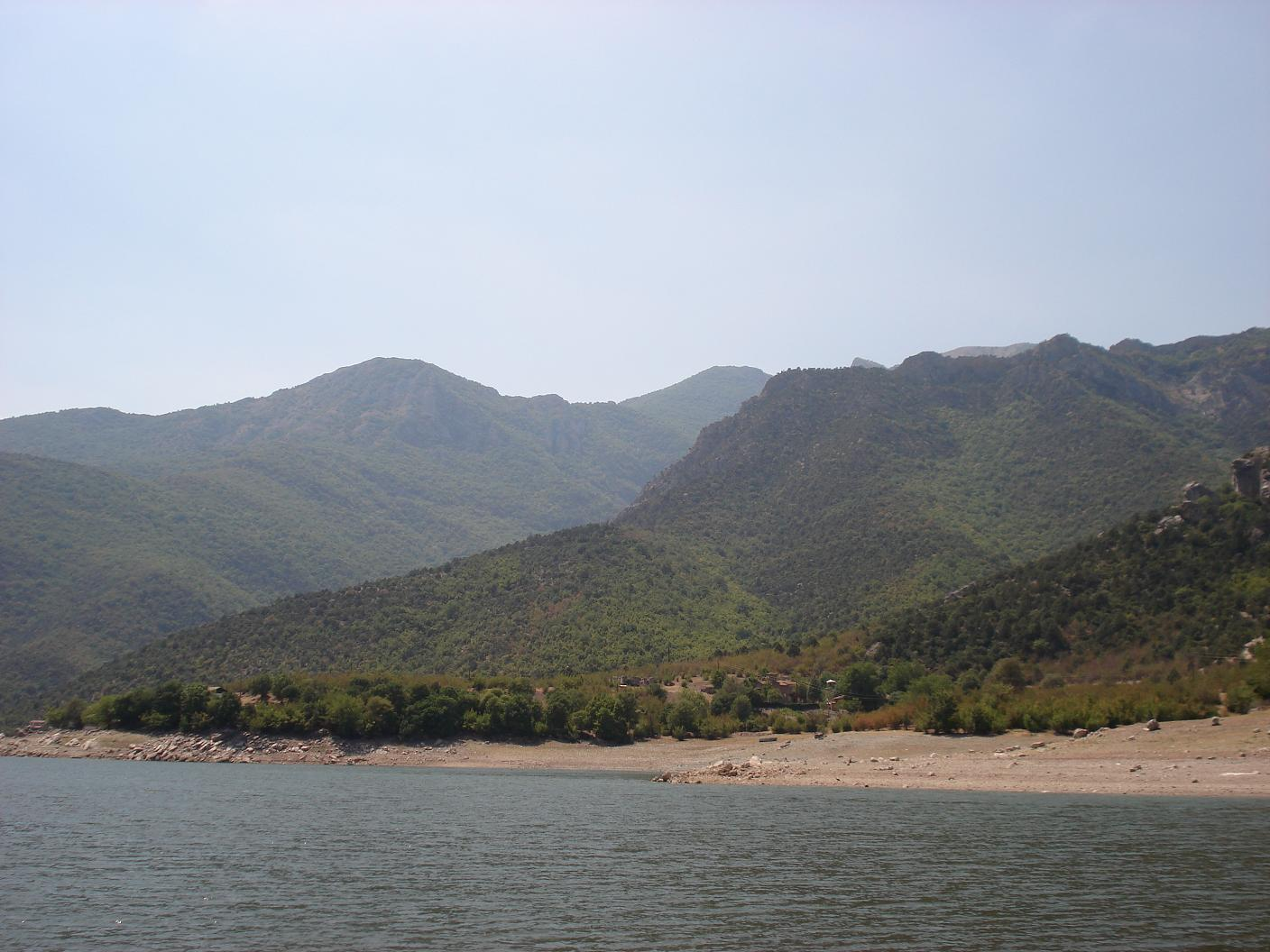
Lake Tikveš.

Tikveš plain (Macedonian: Тиквеш) is situated in central North Macedonia. It is known for an artificial lake, which is the site of the Tikveš Hydroelectric Power Station. It is home to the towns of Kavadarci and Negotino. Famous for its wine, Tikveš is the center of the Macedonian wine production which has been cultivated for more than 120 years. The region is also famous for its yogurt and sour milk. It was also the site of the Tikveš uprising in late June 1913.

== Environment ==
=== Important Bird Area ===
The lake forms the centre of a 25,500 ha tract, encompassing arable land, forest, shrubland and wetland, that has been designated an Important Bird Area (IBA) by BirdLife International because it supports populations of rock partridges, black storks, Eurasian eagle-owls, Egyptian vultures, short-toed snake-eagles, golden eagles, lesser kestrels, eastern subalpine warblers, western rock nuthatches, eastern black-eared wheatears and black-headed buntings.

== Wine industry ==
A large fertile plain of about 2,000 square kilometres (770 sq mi) makes up the Tikveš district (part of Povardarie region), located in central North Macedonia and enclosed by mountain highlands on three sides. It consists of gentle undulating hills at an average of 300 metres (980 ft) above sea-level. Its climate is characterized by long, hot summers and mild and rainy sub-mediterranean winters with an average of 460 mm (18 in) of rainfall each year. Spring is shorter here and Autumn is a bit longer and warmer.

Its altitude varies between 110 and 650 metres (360 and 2,130 ft). The Vardar River, the country's principal river, cuts the valley into western and eastern sections. These two sections are very different in their relief, climate, surface waters, soil quality and flora and fauna. The valley's eastern section is arid and sparsely populated, while the western section is fertile and, compared to that of the east, much more densely populated. This area is also rich in forests, minerals and pastureland, with vineyards and orchards.

=== District's wine growing characteristics ===
- average sum of active temperatures during vegetation 42.84 °C (109.11 °F)
- absolute maximum temperature 44.8 °C (112.6 °F)
- absolute minimum temperature −23.2 °C (−9.8 °F)
- average air temperature during the vegetation period 19.3 °C (66.7 °F)
- average late spring frosts occur to 23 March, early autumn frosts from 4 November
- average rainfall per year 483 mm (19.0 in)
- average rainfall in the period of vegetation 262 mm (10.3 in)
- sum of sunny hours during vegetation 1750.8

=== Varieties ===
As a result of a harmonious climatic and geographic convergence, the Tikveš region is a perfect place for the cultivation of wine (which is locally popular). The region has produced wine for over 2,500 years.

Today, there are predominantly 20 different grape varieties grown in the Tikveš region. The local Smederevka, Vranec and Temjanika comprise 80% of the total grape production. As wine consumers' preferences change globally, the region keep paces with current trends and adjusts its vine varieties accordingly.

== See also ==
- Muscat Ottonel
- Povardarie
- Smederevka
- Temjanika (Muscat Blanc à Petits Grains)
- Vranec
