= Vataša =

Vataša Ваташа
- Village
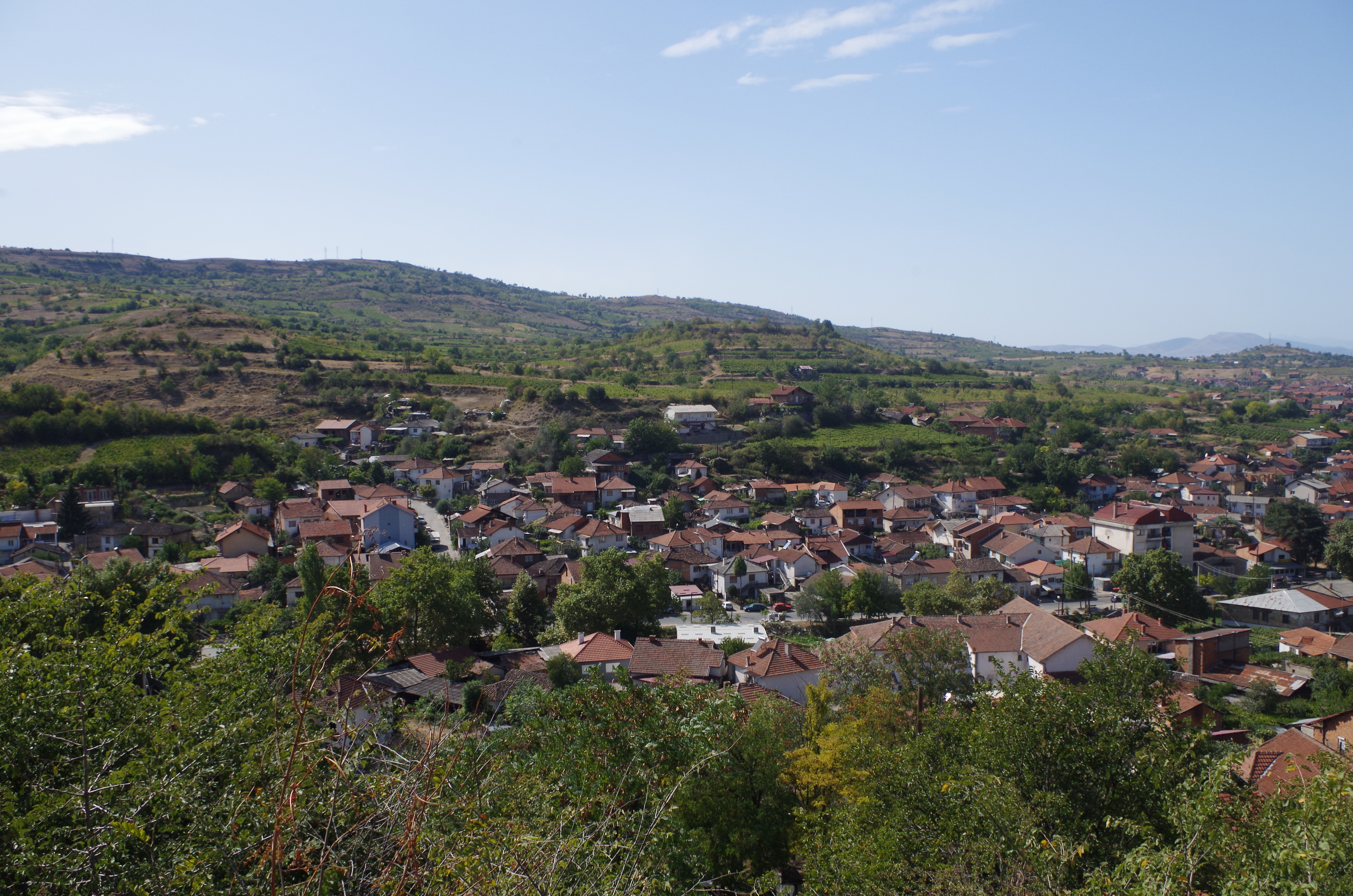
- View of the village

- Location within North Macedonia
- Coordinates: 41.418388°N 22.018309°E
- Country: North Macedonia
- Region: Vardar
- Municipality: Kavadarci

Population (2002)
  - Total: 3,502
- Time zone: UTC+1 (CET)
  - Summer (DST): UTC+2 (CEST)
- Website: .

Vataša (Macedonian: Ваташа) is a village in the municipality of Kavadarci, North Macedonia.

== Demographics ==
According to the statistics of the Bulgarian ethnographer Vasil Kanchov from 1900, the settlement is recorded as "Vatosha" and as having 1808 inhabitants, 1142 Christian Bulgarians, 618 Muslim Bulgarians and 48 Romani. On the 1927 ethnic map of Leonhard Schulze-Jena, the village is shown as having a mixed population of Christian Bulgarians and Turks. According to the 2002 census, the village had a total of 3502 inhabitants. Ethnic groups in the village include:

- Macedonians 3224
- Turks 13
- Serbs 20
- Romani 238
- Aromanians 1
- Others 6
- Unknown/Unidentified 1

== Sports ==
The local football club FK Gaber plays in the Macedonian Third Football League.
