= House of the Army, Strumica =

House of the Army of Republic of North Macedonia Домот на Армијата на Република Северна Македонија
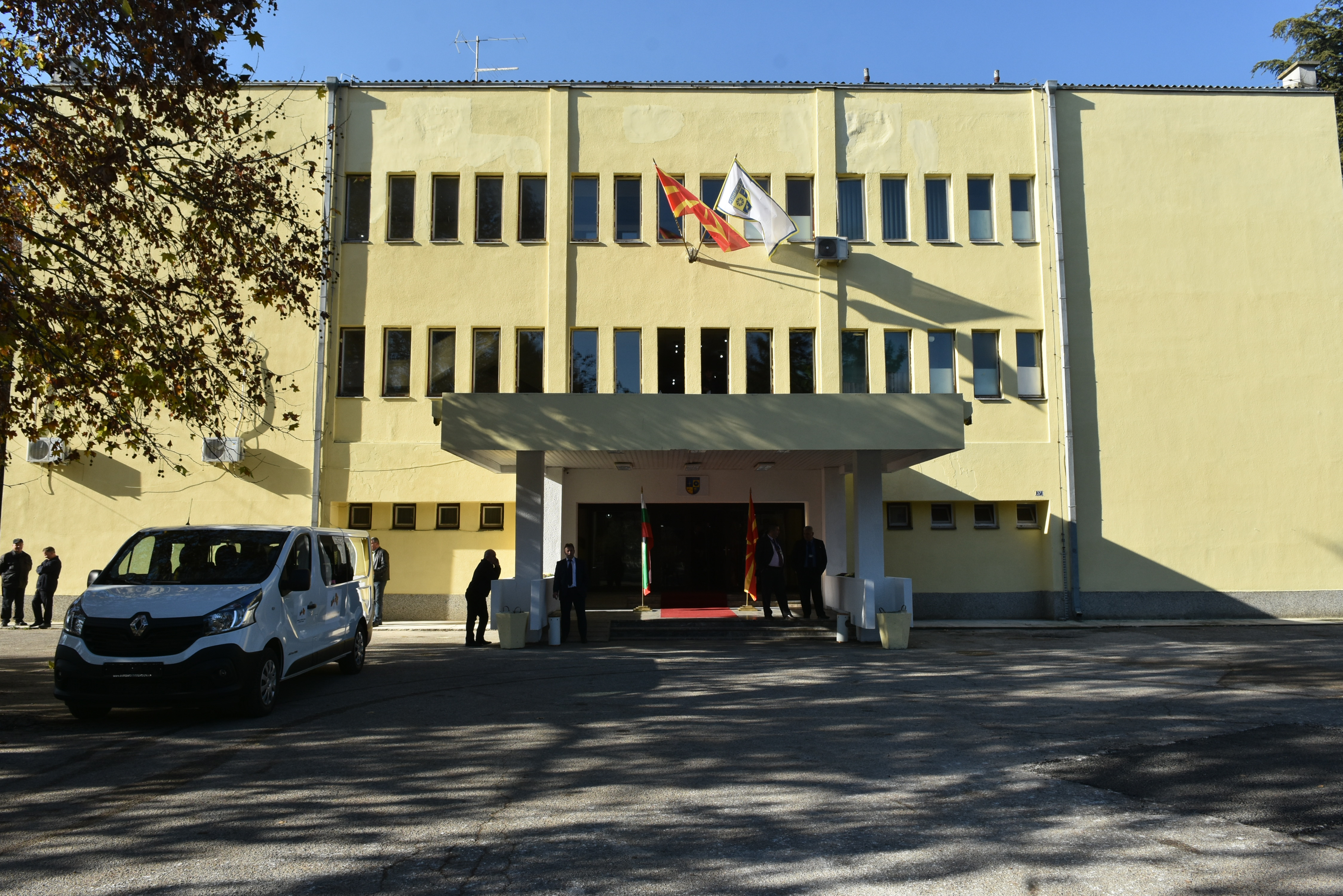
- The house photographed on a joint meeting between Bulgaria and North Macedonia, november 2017.

General information
- Location: Strumica, North Macedonia
- Coordinates: 41.442282°N 22.637067°E
- Owner: Strumica Municipality

The House of the Army of the Republic of North Macedonia (Macedonian: Домот на Армијата на Република Северна Македонија, romanized: Domot na Armijata na Republika Severna Makedonija), before known as the House of the Yugoslav People's Army (Serbo-Croatian: Dom Jugoslovenske narodne armije) is an elite object in the city of Strumica, North Macedonia used for various events, some of them being cultural manifestations, ceremonies and sessions of the municipality. It is located in the Central Park, on Blagoj Jankov Mučeto street. After the independence of Macedonia in 1991 it was in ownership of ARM, but after the closing of the military barracks in 2005 it was given to the local municipality.
