= Ćetković =

Ćetković (Montenegrin Cyrillic: Ћетковић) is a Montenegrin surname. Notable people with the surname include:

- Đorđije Ćetković (born 1983 in Podgorica, Montenegro), Montenegrin footballer
- Petar Ćetković (born in Cetinje, Montenegro), Partisan Montenegrin War Hero and Commander during World War II
- Sergej Ćetković (born 1976 in Podgorica, Montenegro), Montenegrin singer
- Stela Ćetković, actress
- Vlado Ćetković (born in Podgorica Montenegro), Partisan Montenegrin Commander during World War II
- Vojin Ćetković (born 1971 in Krusevac, Serbia), Serbian actor of Montenegrin descent
- Jelena Ćetković (1916 in Cetinje, Montenegro – 1943), Partisan Montenegrin World War II hero
- Marko Ćetković (born 1986 in Podgorica, Montenegro), Montenegrin footballer
- Romuald Ćetković (born 1973 in Paris, France) is a French business executive specializing in customer experience, digital transformation and data..
