= Dragišić =

Dragišić is a surname. Notable people with the surname include:

- Dara Dragišić (1921–1944), Yugoslav partisan
- Ivaniš Dragišić Hrvatinić (died bef. 1446), vojvoda from the Hrvatinić family
- Juraj Dragišić (c. 1445–1520), Bosnian Franciscan theologian and philosopher
- Stevo Dragišić (born 1971), Serbian politician
- Zoran Dragišić (born 1967), Serbian politician
