= Belo, Medvode =

Belo
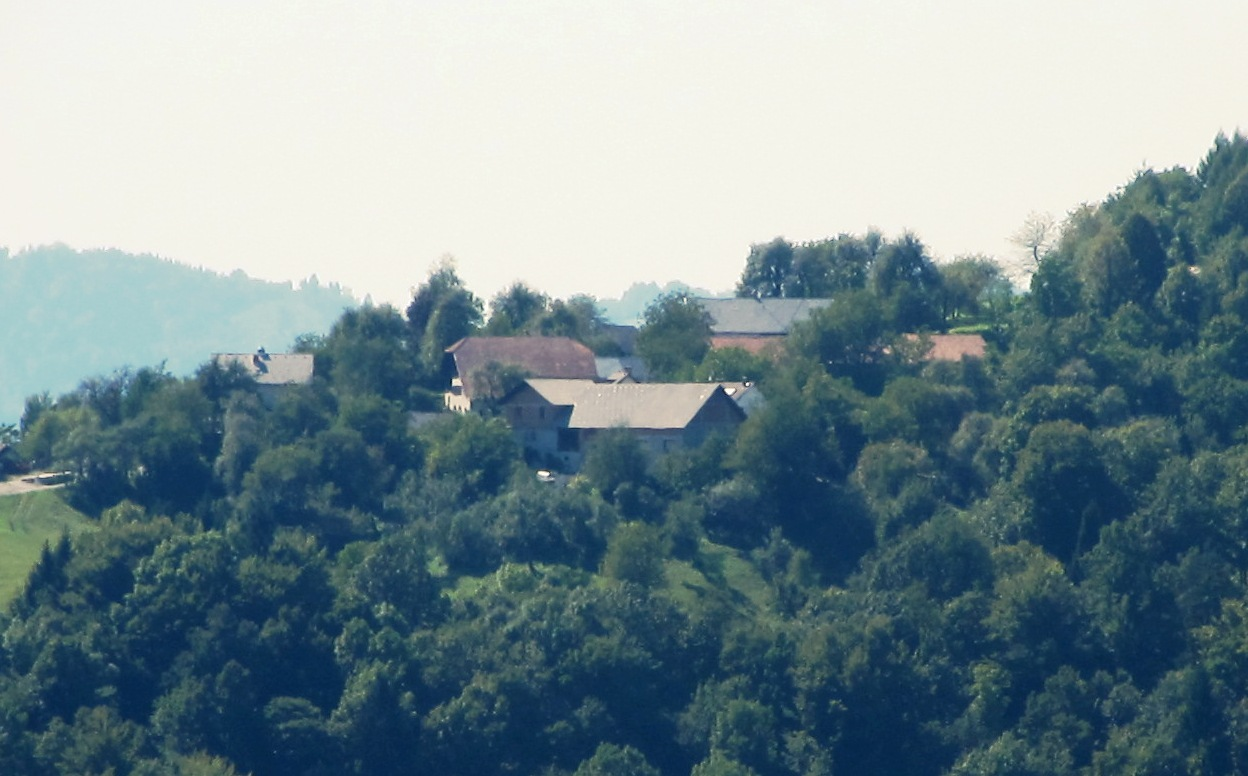
- Belo

- Location in Slovenia
- Coordinates: 46°4′44.13″N 14°21′36.94″E
- Country: Slovenia
- Traditional region: Upper Carniola
- Statistical region: Central Slovenia
- Municipality: Medvode

Area
  - Total: 1.18 km^{2} (0.46 sq mi)
- Elevation: 639.6 m (2,098 ft)

Population (2002)
  - Total: 27

Belo (pronounced [ˈbeːlɔ]) is a small settlement in the Municipality of Medvode in the Upper Carniola region of Slovenia. In the past it was known as Nawelim in German.

== Name ==
Belo was attested in historical documents as Weizzenperg in 1364, and as Wela, Nabela, and Vnnderwela in 1498, among other spellings.

== Cultural heritage ==
Several structures in Belo are registered as cultural heritage:

- The farm at Belo no. 1, known as the Lenart farm (Slovene: pr' Lenart), consists of a single-story stone house with a 16th-century foundation; the year 1858 is carved into the door casing. There is a cottage bearing the year 1827; this was a building used by a retired farmer that continued to live on the farm. Other structures include a granary with a cellar, a stone barn with a mow, a beehouse, a fruit-drying shed, and a hayrack. There is also a plaque on the house commemorating the communist people's hero Lizika Jančar (a.k.a. Majda; 1919–1943), who was shot in Belo on 20 March 1943.
- The house at Belo no. 2 stands on the eastern edge of the settlement, east of the farm at Belo no. 1. It is a two-story stone house from the end of the 20th century completely reconstructed from older architectural elements brought from elsewhere, including a door casing from green tuff, window casings, and beamed ceilings.
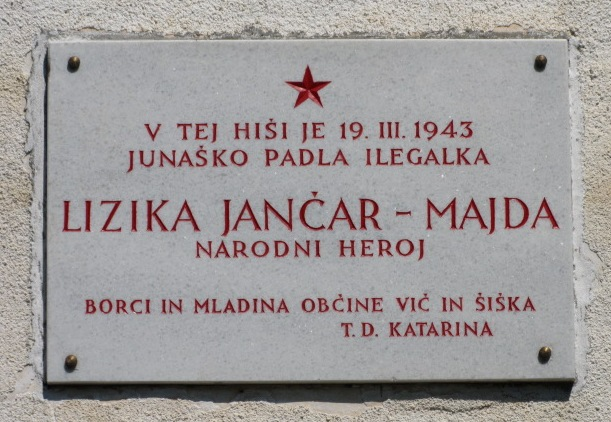
Plaque commemorating Lizika Jančar (1919–1943)
