= Martin Guleski =

Macedonian architect and former university professor

- Born: March 6, 1945 (age 81); Strumica, SFR Yugoslavia (now North Macedonia)
- Occupation: Architect
- Awards: Great Annual Award for Architecture by the AAM (2000); Grand Prix at BIMAS (2002)
- Buildings: Nova International School Skopje

Martin Guleski (born 6 March 1945) is a Macedonian architect and former university professor at the Faculty of Architecture - Skopje, part of Ss. Cyril and Methodius University of Skopje.

== Biography ==
He was born in Strumica, North Macedonia, on March 6, 1945, and completed his primary and secondary education in Skopje. Guleski graduated in 1969 from the Faculty of Architecture at the Polytechnic Institute in Lviv, Ukraine with a thesis titled "A Settlement for 1000 Families." Guleski attended the Moscow Architectural Institute for one year, where he was taught about the architectural conditions during the period of Soviet avant-garde.

== Career ==
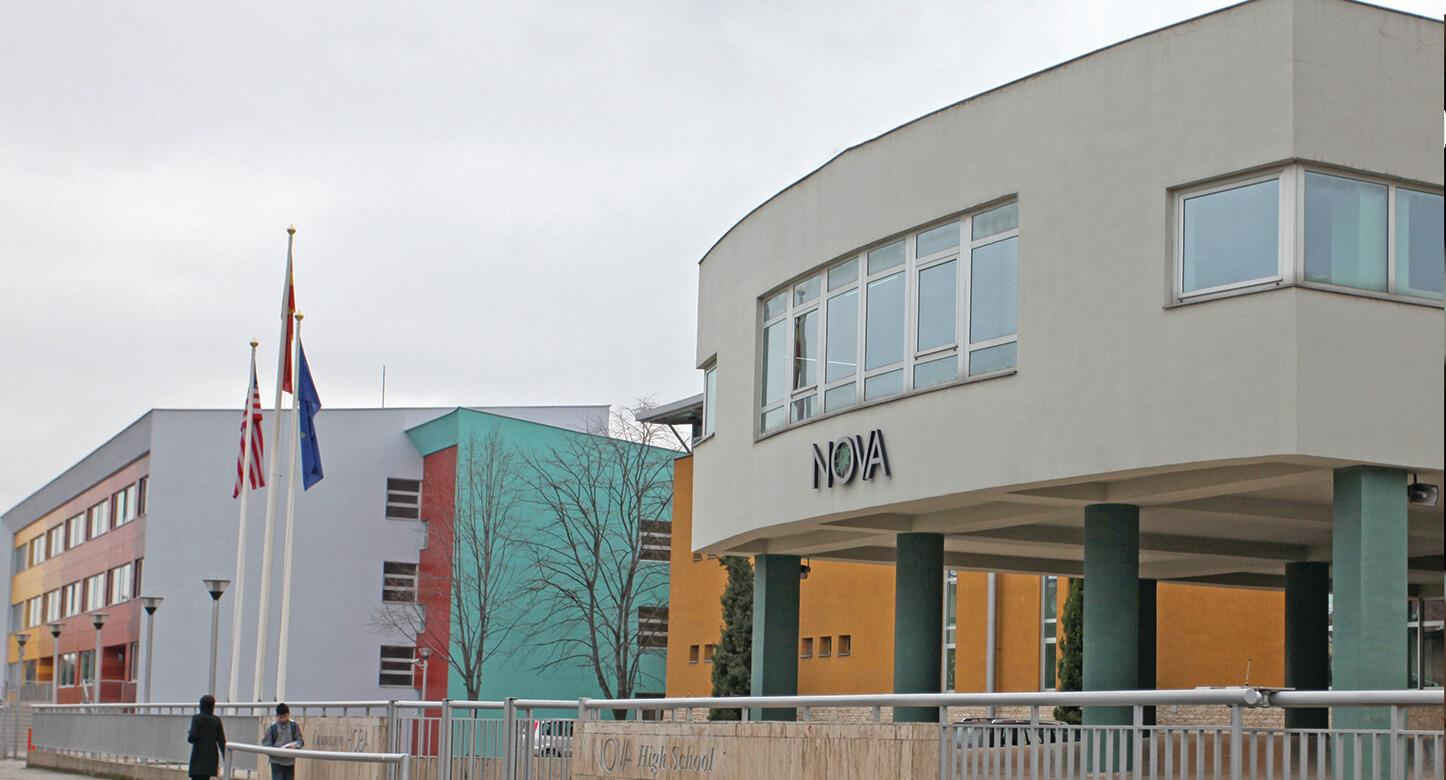
NOVA High School by Guleski

Martin Guleski began his design career after graduation from the Polytechnic Institute, taking a position at the design office Pelagonia Project under the GP "Pelagonia" in Skopje. In 1972, he was appointed as an assistant at the Faculty of Architecture - Skopje in the Department of Public Building Design.

He obtained his master's degree from the Faculty of Architecture in Belgrade, Serbia in 1986 with a thesis on "Planning Residential Space from the Perspective of Demographic Changes and Sociological Needs in a Certain Population Structure." In 1991, he defended his doctoral dissertation titled "The Problem of Flexibility in the Space of Multifunctional Cultural Buildings" at the Faculty of Architecture in Skopje, where he was appointed as an assistant professor in 1992.

Guleski collaborated for more than three decades with fellow architectural professors Boris Chipan, Slavko Brezoski, Zivko Popovski, and Mihajlo Volkanov. Since 1991, Martin Guleski has been a permanent collaborator in the design office "Atelier Ajvar" in Skopje. His work was presented in two solo exhibitions within the biennial events of the Association of Architects of Macedonia (AAM) in the premises of the National Gallery Daut Pasha Hammam and the Museum of Contemporary Art in Skopje.

== Works ==
Guleski is the author of more than 100 planned projects and 20 realized projects. As a member of the standing review commission of the Republic Institute for the Advancement of Housekeeping, he has also reviewed over 20 projects for preschool, school, and healthcare buildings. He was part of the teams representing the Republic of Macedonia at the Venice Biennale of Architecture—in 2008 as a co-author of the project Metamak Cutouts, and in 2010 as an educator of the project "Learning from Architecture."
