= Petar Leković =

Serbian soldier active in WWI and WWII

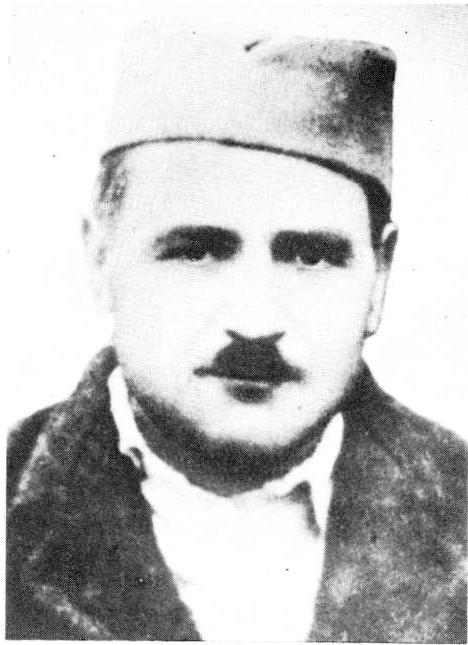
- Born: 23 November 1893; Svračkovo near Požega, Kingdom of Serbia
- Died: 13 June 1942 (aged 48); Čemerno near Gacko, occupied Kingdom of Yugoslavia
- Military career
- Allegiance: Serbian Army; Yugoslav Partisans
- Service years: 1914–1915; 1941–1942
- Awards: People's Hero of Yugoslavia

Petar Leković (23 November 1893 – 13 June 1942), was a Serbian soldier active in both World War I and World War II. A stonecutter by profession, Leković was declared the first People's Hero of Yugoslavia.

As a soldier of the Serbian Army, he participated in the First World War, during 1914 and 1915. He distinguished himself as a brave and capable fighter, but due to his wounds, he was captured in the fall of 1915 in the vicinity of Peć. He spent the rest of the war in Hungarian captivity near Budapest. After the end of the war, he returned to his hometown and learned the stone-cutting craft, and soon after he got married and moved to the village of Recice near Požega. He traveled extensively in search of work, mostly in western Serbia. In the post-WWI period he became a sympathizer of the Communist Party of Yugoslavia, and because of his expressed righteousness and solidarity, he often came into conflict with his employers, as well as with the government.

After 1938, he renewed his contacts with the then illegal Communist Party and participated in some of its actions. Following the occupation of Yugoslavia in 1941, Leković joined the Užice partisan detachment with his three sons and took part in insurgent actions. After the First Enemy Offensive and the withdrawal of partisan forces from Serbia, in March 1942, he joined the Second Proletarian Strike Brigade, in which he was appointed Deputy Commander of the First Užice Battalion. By the decision of the Supreme Headquarters at the end of March 1942, he was proclaimed the People's Hero of Yugoslavia.

== Biography ==
He was born on November 23, 1893, in the village of Svračkovo, near Užička Požega, where his birthplace is today. He came from a poor peasant family. His father Milinko, in addition to Peter, had three other sons and a daughter. He finished primary school in his native village. Since the family had a hard time supporting themselves, Petar started working from the earliest childhood. At first, he was engaged in various physical jobs, mainly related to farming, and as a young man, he began to learn the stone-cutting craft. His studies were interrupted in 1914 when he was drafted at the start of the Great war.

=== World War I ===
The beginning of the World War I, in July 1914, found him serving his military service in Kragujevac. After the outbreak of the war, he was assigned to the First Company of the Second Battalion of the Fifth Infantry Regiment of the Drina Division. With this unit, he took part in the battles on the Cer and Drina, during the summer and early autumn of 1914. Leković distinguished himself in these battles with his courage, and he also captured several enemy soldiers. After the Battle of Kolubara and the victorious offensive of the Serbian army, he broke out with his unit on the Sava, near Obrenovac. Then a great epidemic of typhus began, so Petar fell ill with typhus. After recovering, he returned home briefly, but soon returned to his unit.

In October 1915, when the great enemy invasion of the Kingdom of Serbia began, Petar took part in the first battles on the Sava river. After withdrawing from the initial positions, together with several soldiers, near the village of Grabovac, near Obrenovac, he protected the withdrawal of his unit. He was then wounded in the leg. After stationing his unit in Kragujevac, he refused to go to the hospital and remained in the unit at his own request. He then took part in the battles near Kraljevo and Raška, and then in Kosovo and near Peć. Since he had problems with the wound, which could not heal in any way, he was transferred to the rear. Due to the sudden German attack, his unit had to withdraw, so he was captured along with other exhausted soldiers from the background.

Together with the other prisoners, he was taken first to Raška, and then to Kragujevac. From there, they were taken by train to a prison camp in Hungary, not far from Budapest. The living conditions in this camp were extremely difficult, and the food was especially poor. Due to the bad conditions, the prisoners protested, and during the protest, Petar was at the head of a group and in the delegation for negotiations with the camp administration. In order to improve the food of the detainees, the camp administration then decided to send the prisoners to work on the surrounding properties. Peter was assigned to a certain Janos, whom he helped with field jobs. From the boss, when he worked, he received news about the October Revolution in Russia and the bad situation on the Austro-Hungarian fronts. Encouraged by these news, Petar decided to flee, but after a few days, he was recaptured.

After the signing of the armistice in November 1918, all prisoners of war left the camp near Budapest and came to Belgrade, from where they returned to their homes. Shortly after arriving in his native village, Petar was called to the unit to which he belonged before his capture. In Zagreb, he reported to the command of the Fifth Infantry Regiment, where he had to describe in detail how he was captured and how long he was in captivity. After the check, he was sent to Jelenje, near Rijeka, where his unit was located. Arriving at the unit, Petar did not find many of his war comrades from 1914 and 1915, because many were killed during the crossing of Albania and on the Salonika front. Due to exhaustion, Peter's health deteriorated sharply after returning to the unit, and he was soon discharged from the army.

== Legacy ==
In the battles, he distinguished himself with heroic deeds. By the decision of the Supreme Headquarters at the end of March 1942, he was proclaimed the first national hero of Yugoslavia. He died in June 1942 in battles with Italians and Chetniks, on the mountain Zivnju, near Gacko. In the last battle, Leković protected the retreat of his battalion, which was left without ammunition. He rolled big rocks at the advancing enemies when he was shot.

A school in Požega is named after him.

== Literature ==
- Gončin, Milorad (1972). Naš prvi narodni heroj Petar Leković. Beograd: „Četvrti juli”.
- Narodni heroji Jugoslavije. Vol. I. Beograd: Narodna knjiga. 1982.
