= Majda Vrhovnik =

Slovenian spy (1922–1945)

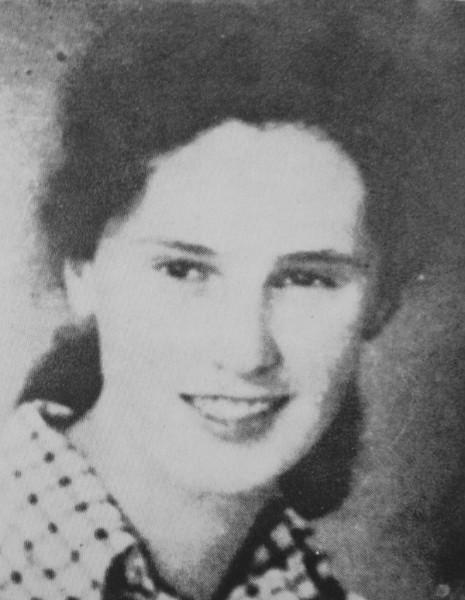
- Born: 14 April 1922; Ljubljana, Kingdom of Yugoslavia
- Died: 4 May 1945 (aged 23); Klagenfurt, Nazi Germany
- Cause of death: Shot
- Resting place: Klagenfurt, Austria
- Other name: Lojzka
- Education: Medicine
- Alma mater: Faculty of Medicine, University of Ljubljana
- Occupation: Espionage
- Known for: People's Hero of Yugoslavia
- Political party: Communist

Majda Vrhovnik (nom de guerre Lojzka) (14 April 1922 – 4 May 1945) was a Slovene communist and medical student. She was a member of the District Committee of the Communist Party of Slovenia for Klagenfurt and was named a people's hero of Yugoslavia after her death.

== Life ==
Majda Vrhovnik was born 14 April 1922 in Ljubljana. Her older brother Vladimir Vrhovnik (17 August 1916 – 28 April 1945, a.k.a. Volodja or Mirko, also a member of the Communist Party) was born in Vienna, but the family moved to Ljubljana after the First World War.

After graduating from an upper secondary school she enrolled in the University of Ljubljana’s Faculty of Medicine. During her studies she was a member of the Slovene Club and the student revolutionary movement. She was accepted for membership in the Communist Party of Yugoslavia in 1940.

Vrhovnik joined the underground movement immediately after the occupation of Yugoslavia. She became a courier for the organizational secretary of the Central Committee of the Communist Party of Slovenia, Tone Tomšič (1910–1942). When the occupying forces became aware of her activity they sentenced her to life in prison in absentia, holding her parents as hostages for several months. Vrhovnik nonetheless remained in Ljubljana. She participated in organizing an underground printshop for the resistance in Ljubljana. As a courier, she carried manuscripts for the underground printshops in Ljubljana codenamed Podmornica 'submarine' at Brdo Street (Cesta na Brdo) no. 95 and Tunel 'tunnel' at Emona Street (Emonska cesta) no. 2. With the assistance of her brother, she managed to set up a bunker where, starting on 4 May 1943, she reproduced copies of Ljudska pravica (The People’s Justice), Slovenski poročevalec (Slovenian Reporter), Radio vestnik (Messenger Radio), and various other brochures for nine months.

At her own choosing, on 22 January 1944 she was sent to the Slovenian Littoral. There she served as an instructor for the Young Communist League of Yugoslavia (SKOJ) for Idrija and an instructor for SKOJ training courses for the SKOJ Regional Committee for the Littoral. However, she did not remain there long, but volunteered to work in Carinthia. In 1944 she was named secretary of the District Committee of the Communist Party of Slovenia for Mežica; she crossed the Drava River and went through the Sattnitz Mountains, first working in the Völkermarkt area and then in Klagenfurt. In the fall of 1944 she became a member of the District Committee of the Communist Party of Slovenia for Klagenfurt. Disguised as a peasant girl, she spent several months in Klagenfurt and took part in organizing committees for the Liberation Front, espionage, and illegal publications for the city.

The Gestapo managed to discover her through betrayal, and on 28 February 1945 she was arrested in a house below Kreuzbergl hill in Klagenfurt. She was tortured in prison and shot on 4 May 1945. Her grave remains unmarked to this day. She was proclaimed a people's hero of Yugoslavia on 5 July 1951 or 20 December 1951.

== Legacy ==
Majda Vrhovnik Primary School (Osnovna šola Majde Vrhovnik) at [Simon] Gregorčič Street (Gregorčičeva ulica) no. 16 in Ljubljana was named for Vrhovnik in 1958, created by merging Primary School no. 5 on Šubic Street (Šubičeva ulica) and Primary School no. 6 on Vrtača Street. A bust of Vrhovnik was created by the Slovene sculptor Stojan Batič in 1961 and stands in front of the school.

"Majda Vrhovnik" was used as a pseudonym by Franci Zavrl, the editor of Mladina, after his arrest. The pseudonym "Majda Vrhovnik" was also used by the Mladina journalist Vlado Miheljak at the same time.
