= Vlado Bagat =

Vlado Bagat

Vlado Bagat (20 October 1915 – 1 June 1944) was a Yugoslav soldier.

A native of Split, Bagat joined the Communist Party of Yugoslavia in 1939. After the Axis invasion of Yugoslavia in 1941, Bagat was involved in the creation of the first Partisan units in Dalmatia and took part in actions against the Italian occupation force. In 1943, after the capitulation of Italy and during the following German counteroffensive, as a political commissar of the 4th Naval Sector he supervised a successful evacuation of Partisan units and civilian refugees from the Dalmatian coast to islands and Italy, now controlled by the Allied forces.

In May 1944, as a political commissioner of the 2nd Naval Sector, he thwarted a German attempt to destroy Partisan units on the island of Krk. Upon the return from his mission, he was killed in an ambush by German forces on the island of Olib.

Posthumously he received the title of People's Hero of Yugoslavia. After the war a sewing-machine factory in Zadar and an elementary school in Split were named after him. After the dissolution of Yugoslavia in 1991 and the Croatian War of Independence, the school was renamed to Pojišan Elementary School. A memorial on Olib, built to mark the place of his death, was also removed during the war.
