= Ljubo Čupić =

Yugoslav resistance member

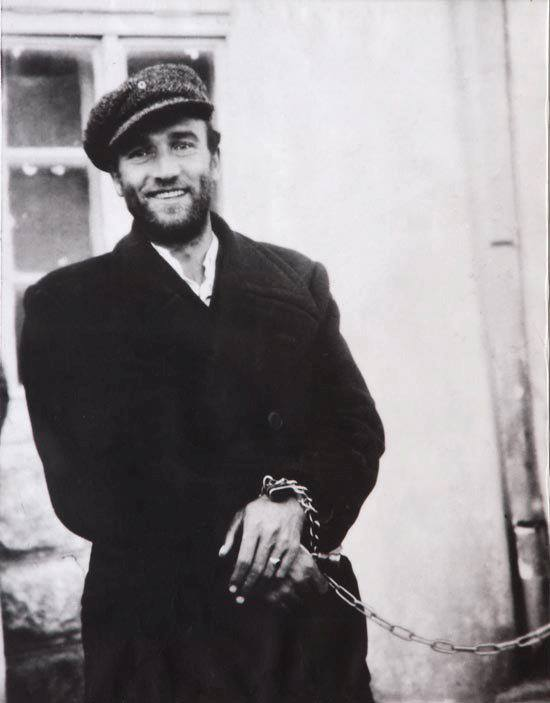
- Čupić moments before his public execution by firing squad
- Born: 1913; Argentina
- Died: 9 May 1942 (aged 28–29); Nikšić, Italian governorate of Montenegro
- Education: University of Belgrade
- Organization: Yugoslav Partisans
- Movement: League of Communists of Yugoslavia
- Awards: Order of the People's Hero (posthumously)

Čedomir "Ljubo" Čupić (Serbian Cyrillic: Чедомир Љубо Чупић; 1913 – 9 May 1942) was a Yugoslav law student, political commissioner of Communist resistance movement in Nikšić, Montenegro and decorated war hero of Yugoslavia.

He became known on a wider scale for the photo of him taken moments before he was shot by Chetniks who captured him, showing him with shackles on his hands and smiling. He is a recipient of the Order of the People's Hero, a Yugoslav medal for gallantry. He is commonly referred to by media as "Yugoslav Che Guevara".

== Biography ==
He was born in 1913 in Argentina, one of the ten children in an immigrant working-class Montenegrin family. His parents were Sava and Stana (née Burić) from the village of Zagarač. One of his brothers was Vukan Čupić, a famous pediatrician who founded the 'Mother and Child Institute', a paediatric clinic in Belgrade.

During the 1930s, he moved to Nikšić, where he finished high school. He studied law at the University of Belgrade, and joined the League of Communists of Yugoslavia in 1940.

After the invasion of Yugoslavia he returned to Nikšić and participated in the preparation of the uprising. In July 1941, he fled from the Nazi-occupied city and joined the Partisan division "Đuro Đaković", formed by communists and SKOJ members who had also escaped from Nikšić.

As a commissioner of the Partisan movement in Nikšić, he was captured by Chetniks in April 1942, after a battle on Kablena Glavica near Nikšić. He was tortured in prison and was subject to a public trial by the ad hoc court composed by the Chetniks. He was sentenced to death and executed by firing squad. Before his public execution he cheered his friends and the people who were forced to witness the event. Among his last word was the slogan "Long live the glorious Communist Party."

== Legacy ==
He was posthumously declared a people's hero by decree of the Yugoslav President Josip Broz Tito on 10 July 1953.

In memory of Ljubo Čupić, a street in Zagorič, a neighborhood of Podgorica, has been named after him.

In 2018, a statue dedicated to him was revealed in his hometown of Nikšić.
