= Andreana Družina =

Slovenian political commissar (1920–2021)

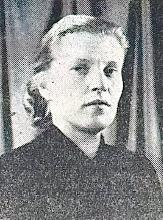
Andreana Družina, 1953

Andreana Družina (26 January 1920 – 7 March 2021) was a Slovenian political commissar and partisan. She was awarded the Order of the People's Hero of Yugoslavia. Družina was born in Trieste, Italy, and died on 7 March 2021, at the age of 101.

== Biography ==
Andreana's parents moved from Trieste to Ljubljana in 1929 due to fascist violence and later to Zagreb. In late 1941, Andreana joined the Liberation Front and collaborated with members of VOS. In June 1942, she joined the partisans and became a member of the fighters of the "Ljubo Šercer" Brigade. She was wounded several times in battles and joined the Communist Party of Slovenia in 1943. In 1944, she was appointed as the political commissar of the "Postojanka Planina" (Slovenian Central Military Partisan Hospital), later serving as an intelligence officer in the 15th Division and as assistant commander of the intelligence center of the 7th Corps.

From April 1945, she worked in OZNA and the State Security Service (SDV). She retired in 1964. She was the last living national hero in Slovenia.

She died on 7 March 2021, at the age of 101, in a nursing home in Logatec.
