= Petar Matić Dule =

Yugoslav politician and army officer (1920–2024)

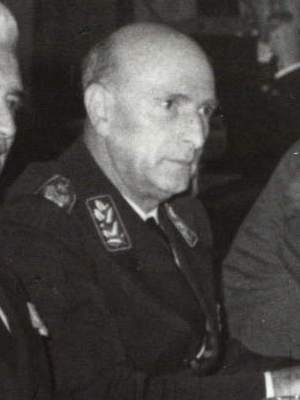
- Matić in 1978
- Born: 6 July 1920; Irig, Kingdom of Serbs, Croats and Slovenes
- Died: 4 October 2024 (aged 104); Belgrade, Serbia
- Citizenship: Kingdom of Yugoslavia; Socialist Federal Republic of Yugoslavia; Serbia and Montenegro; Serbia
- Political party: Communist Party of Yugoslavia
- Spouse: Dušanka Matić

Petar Matić Dule (Serbian Cyrillic: Петар Матић Дуле; 6 July 1920 – 4 October 2024) was a Yugoslav Partisan World War II veteran, colonel general of the Yugoslav People's Army (JNA), politician, socio-political worker, and the last living People's Hero of Yugoslavia.

== Biography ==
Matić was born in Irig, Serbia on 6 July 1920. He came from a wealthy farming family. Matić finished primary school in his hometown and until the beginning of the Second World War was engaged in agriculture. Socializing with young workers and students, he became acquainted with the ideas of the labor movement and in June 1940 became a member of the Communist Party of Yugoslavia (CPY).

After the April War and the occupation of the Kingdom of Yugoslavia in 1941, Matić, as secretary of the Local Committee, and then secretary of the CPY District Committee for Irig and a member of the Uprising Preparation Staff, worked very actively to organize the Srem uprising in August 1941, he was in charge of receiving communist prisoners who had escaped from the Sremska Mitrovica prison. When the Irig Partisan company was formed, he became its first political commissar. In the summer of 1942, during a major enemy offensive on Fruška Gora, he was wounded in the leg during a breakthrough. After the departure of the majority of the Srem partisan detachment to eastern Bosnia, he remained in Srem with his Fourth Battalion. At first he was the deputy, and then the commander of this battalion.

In mid-May 1943, he was appointed commander of the Third Group of Vojvodina Strike Battalions, which later formed the Third Vojvodina Strike Brigade. Together with the Brigade Headquarters, he organized a number of ambushes and attacks on populated areas and communications, which were successfully carried out by brigade units in Srem and eastern Bosnia. After an unsuccessful attack on the enemy garrison in Brčko, in November 1943, he returned to Srem, where he took over the duty of commander of the Srem partisan detachment. He was appointed commander of the Sixth Vojvodina Strike Brigade in April 1944. In the battles of this brigade with the Germans on Fruška Gora on 17 July 1944, he was wounded in the chest and was soon transferred to Italy for treatment. Upon his return to the country, he was appointed commander of the Srem Operational Zone at the General Staff of the NOV and PO Vojvodina.

After the liberation of Belgrade in November 1944, he was sent to study in the Soviet Union, where in 1945 he graduated from the K. Е. Voroshilov Higher Military Academy. After finishing school and returning to the liberated Yugoslavia, he graduated from the JNA Higher Military Academy in 1954. He performed various responsible duties in the Yugoslav People's Army (JNA) - he was the commander of the 51st Vojvodina and 4th Krajina Divisions, Chief of Staff of the Corps and Chief of Staff in the General Staff, Chief of the JNA War School, First Deputy Chief of Staff of the JNA, Assistant Federal Secretary for National Defense of the SFRY and Undersecretary in the Federal Secretariat for National Defense (SSNO). Later on, he was the president of the Commission for National Defense and Social Self-Defense (ONO and DSZ) under the Presidency of the Central Committee of the League of Communists of Yugoslavia. He retired on 31 December 1980, as a JNA lieutenant general.

Matić was elected a member of the Central Committee of the 8th Congress of the League of Communists of Yugoslavia. He was also a member of the Plenipotentiary of the Central Committee of the Communist Party of Yugoslavia for the Yugoslav People's Army. He was elected a People's Deputy of the Assembly of Serbia and the Federal Assembly in several convocations. From 1982 to 1986, he was a member of the Presidency of the Central Committee of the CPY. In the spring of 1988, he was elected president of the Federal Board of SUBNOR (vetarns' union), and in October of the same year he was removed due to a conflict with the leadership of the Socialist Republic of Serbia. He later resigned from the membership in the Central Committee.

He was the holder of the Commemorative Medal of the Partisans of 1941 and other Yugoslav decorations, including the Order of the Yugoslav Star with a Ribbon, the Order of the War Banner, the Orders of Merit for the People with a Golden Star, another with Silver Rays, the Order of Brotherhood and Unity with a Golden Wreath, the Order of the People's Army with a Laurel Wreath, another with a Gold Star, the Order of Military Merits with Great Star, the Order of the Partisan Star with a Silver Wreath, and two Orders of Bravery. He was awarded the Order of the People's Hero on 20 December 1951.

Matić's entire family took part in the war. His mother was shot in Jasenovac in 1942. His father was tortured in a German prison and, two weeks after his release from prison, died in his native Irig in Serbia. His aunt, Anka Matić Grozda, died in 1944 during the liberation of Belgrade. She was proclaimed the People's Hero of Yugoslavia on 2 October 1953. His wife Dušanka was also a participant in the People's Liberation War (NOR) and fought during the Belgrade offensive.

Matić turned 100 on 6 July 2020, and died in Belgrade on 4 October 2024, at the age of 104.
