= Vera Blagojević =

Yugoslav political activist

- Вера Благојевић
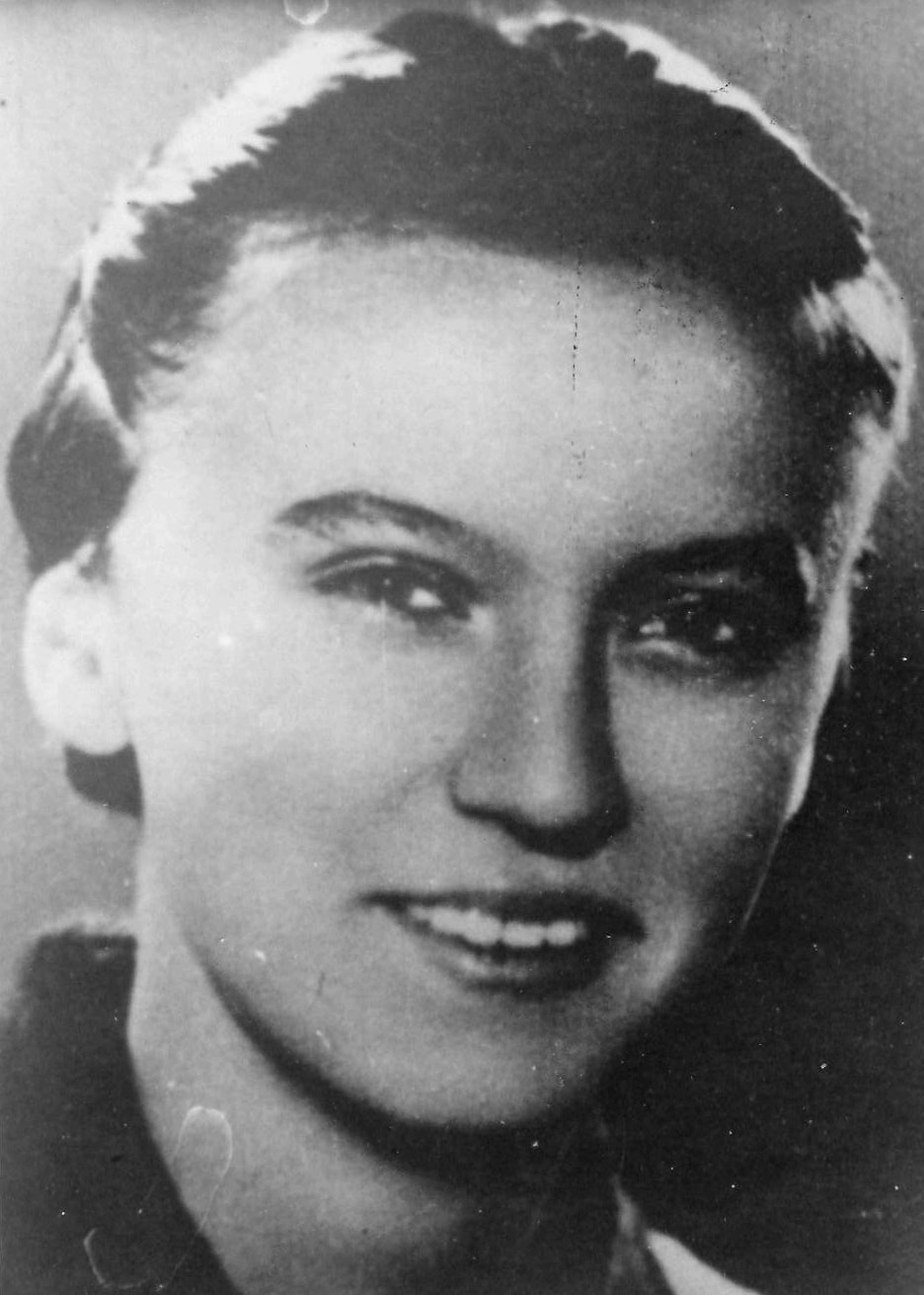
- Vera Blagojević
- Born: 16 May 1920; Belgrade, Kingdom of Yugoslavia
- Died: 18 March 1942 (aged 21); Klenak, Occupied Serbia
- Occupations: Medical student Political activist
- Years active: 1937–1942

Vera Blagojević (Serbian: Вера Благојевић, 16 May 1920 – 18 March 1942) was a Yugoslav medical student and Communist political activist. During World War II, she was captured by the Gestapo in 1942 and later killed. She was posthumously awarded the Order of the People's Hero in 1953.

== Early life ==
Vera Blagojević was born on 16 May 1920 in Belgrade, Kingdom of Yugoslavia. She was the daughter of lawyer Jovan Blagojević (Serbian: Јован Благојевић), who served in the Army during World War I, and housewife Ana Blagojević (Serbian: Анa Благојевић). Her father was a Communist supporter. She grew up in Šabac. In 1937, Blagojević helped organise a student strike in protest of the attitudes of some teachers at the school.

== Activism ==
In 1938, she began studying medicine at the University of Belgrade, during which time she joined a revolutionary Marxist organisation at the University. In the same year, she joined the League of Communist Youth of Yugoslavia (SKOJ). She worked for the League of Communists of Yugoslavia (KPJ) and SKOJ in Šabac, and in 1940, she became a member of the KPJ's Podrinje district committee. After the Nazi occupation of Yugoslavia in 1941, Blagojević attended anti-fascist protests in Belgrade, and after the closure of the University of Belgrade by the Nazis, she taught medicine to KPJ supporting medical students. She transported illegal KPJ material from Belgrade to Šabac, and also worked for the Yugoslavia People's Liberation Movement (NOP), where she worked mainly with female Communists, encouraging women to join the workforce. In June 1941, Blagojević was included on a Šabac police list of 30 most active Communists in the city. Fearing for her safety, Blagojević escaped Šabac and went to Leshnicë e Poshtme. In November 1941, the KPJ sent her to the Jadar region.

== Arrests and death ==
In November 1941, the Yugoslav Partisans, which included the KPJ, were attacked by the Chetniks, who were loyal to Yugoslav government-in-exile. 18 partisans were captured including Blagojević. They were later released, and Blagojević went to Stolice.

Blagojević was rearrested by the Chetniks in March 1942 in Tekeriš. She was transferred to a camp in Senjak in the outskirts of Belgrade, and was placed in the first barracks, which were designated for those likely to be shot. After refusing to give information, she and 62 others were shot dead on 18 March 1942.

== Legacy ==
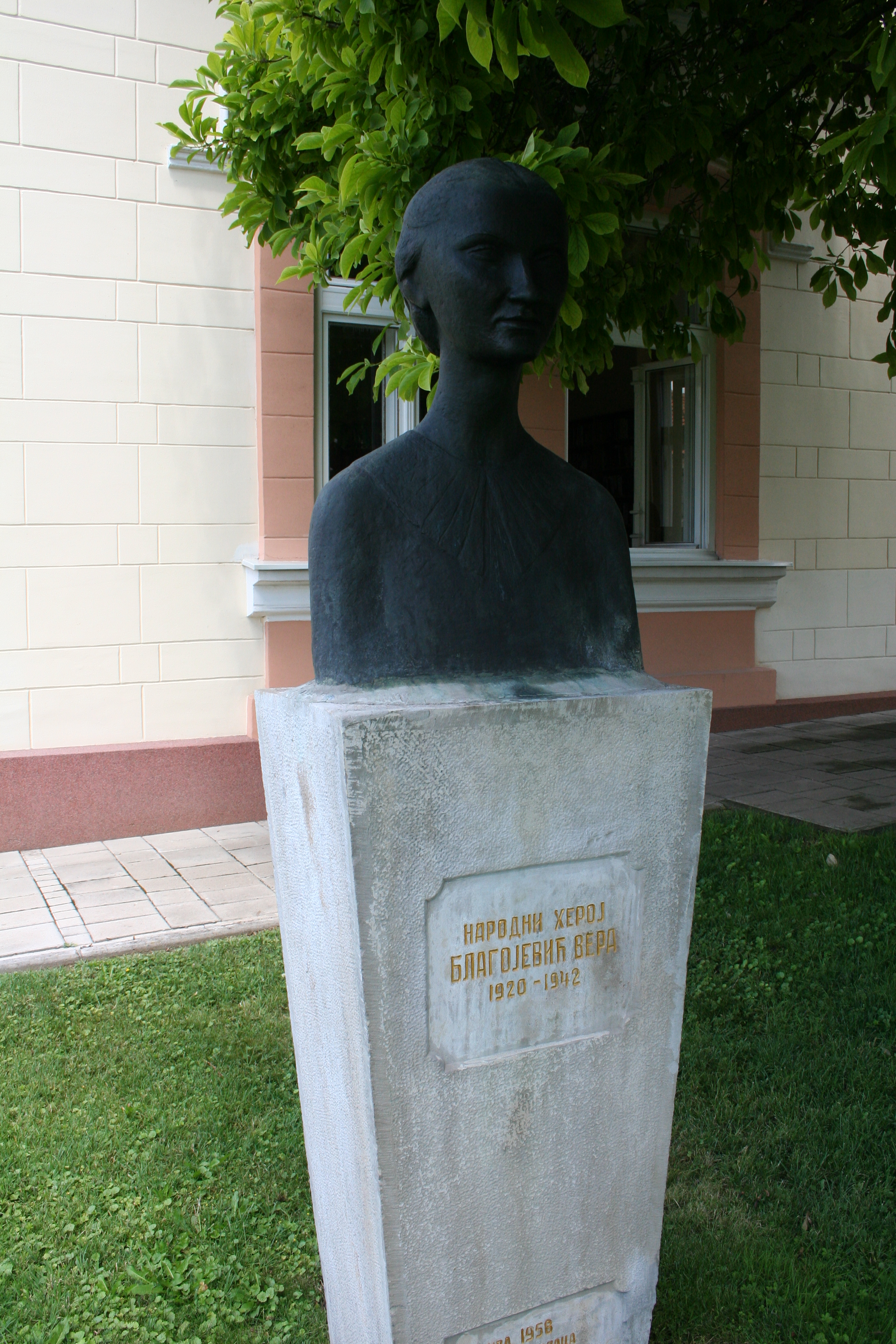
Memorial to Vera Blagojević in Šabac.

In July 1953, Blagojević was posthumously awarded the Order of the People's Hero by then President of Yugoslavia Josip Broz Tito.
