= Lizika Jančar =

Slovene partisan (1919–1943)

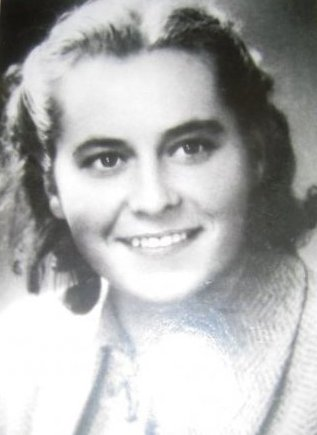
- Lizika Jančar
- Born: 27 October 1919; Maribor, Kingdom of Serbs, Croats, and Slovenes
- Died: 20 March 1943 (aged 23); Belo, Province of Ljubljana
- Cause of death: Shot
- Other names: Majda
- Occupation: Espionage
- Known for: People's Hero of Yugoslavia

Elizabeta "Lizika" Jančar (nom de guerre Majda) (27 October 1919 – 20 March 1943) was a Slovene Partisan.

== Life ==
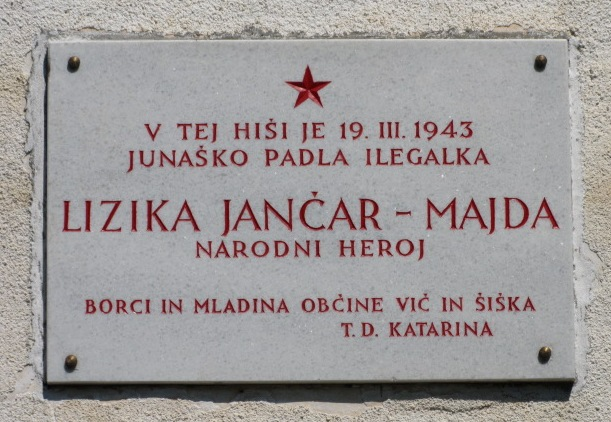
Plaque in Belo commemorating Lizika Jančar

Lizika Jančar was born in Maribor as the daughter of a railway worker that had also worked as a miner in Germany. Jančar became a member of the League of Communist Youth of Yugoslavia (SKOJ) in 1937 in Maribor. She enrolled as a student at the Medical Faculty in Belgrade after finishing high school in Maribor. She relocated to Ljubljana and became a member of the Communist Party of Slovenia in April 1941, where she helped set up the illegal Kričač broadcaster.

In February 1943 she joined the Dolomite Detachment of the Slovene Partisans and served as a wireless operator for the Central Committee of the Communist Party of Slovenia to maintain contact with Moscow. She was captured by Anti-Communist Volunteer Militia forces on 19 March 1943 during the battle in the Belca Gorge (Slovene: Belška grapa) above Belica and was shot the following day in Belo. A plaque was unveiled at the site, at the Lenart farm, in 1976.

She was proclaimed a People's Hero of Yugoslavia on 27 November 1953.

== Legacy ==
The Lizika Jančar Dormitory in Maribor (Dijaški dom Lizike Jančar Maribor) is named for her, as is Lizika Jančar Street in Maribor (Ulica Lizike Jančar) and Ljubljana (Ulica Lizike Jančarjeve).
