= Olga Jovičić =

Yugoslavian activist and partisan soldier

- Born: 3 February 1921; Užička Požega, Kingdom of Yugoslavia
- Died: 11 July 1942 (aged 21); Prozor
- Occupation(s): Activist and Partisan soldier

Olga Jovičić (Užička Požega, 3 February 1921 — Prozor, 11 July 1942) was a People's Hero of Yugoslavia.

== Biography ==
Jovičić was born in 1921 in Užička Požega. After she graduated high school in Kraljevo, she moved to study in Belgrade in 1939. At university he quickly broke out in the forefront of advanced students. She was admitted into the Communist Party of Yugoslavia in 1940. Occupying police arrest after Germany attacked the Soviet Union in June 1941.

Despite the abuse she suffered in prison, she held up well there. In August 1941, he escaped from prison with one comrades. Then came the Kraljevacki "Jovan Kursula" Partisan detachment. Olga and her friend were the first partisan detachment in Kraljevo. The Detachment becomes head of the agitation and propaganda. She went to the villages and held speeches and meetings.

She was appointed political commissar of the First Company of the Fourth (Kraljevo) Battalion. Olga was the first woman political commissar of the People's Liberation Army of Yugoslavia.

When the enemy besieged partisan units in Romanija, in the winter of 1942, and sought to destroy them, the first company of the fourth battalion was tasked to close the direction of Rogatica. She was sick with a high fever. That night, along with the company cutting its way through the snowdrifts on Romanija to Jahorina, and participated in all the battles. When she returned to the troop position, she was hit by machine-gun fire. She fell, seriously wounded, and soon died of her injuries.

By the decree of the Presidium of the National Assembly of the Federal Republic of Yugoslavia, on 20 December 1951, she was declared a national hero. A street in the Belgrade suburb of Kotež bears her name.

== Literature ==
- ŽENE Srbije u NOB / Rada Vujičić...[i dr.]. - Beograd : Nolit, 1975 (Beograd : "Srbija").
- VOJNA enciklopedija. 2, Brdo-Foa / - 2. izd. - Beograd : Redakcija Vojne enciklopedije, 1971 (Ljubljana : Mladinska knjiga).
- KO je ko u Jugoslaviji : jugoslovenski savremenici / - Beograd : Hronometar, 1970 (Čakovec : "Zrinski").
