= Mate Blažina =

- Born: 10 March 1925; Čemparovica, Labin, Kingdom of Italy
- Died: 15 April 1945 (aged 20); Surroundings of Lokve, Gorski Kotar, DF Yugoslavia
- Military career
- Awards: Order of the People's Hero Order of Bravery

Mate Blažina (10 March 1925 – 15 April 1945) was a Croatian antifascist, military commander and Yugoslav National Hero. After the capitulation of Italy, he joined the partisan movement. He contributed to the liberation of Istria and Gorski Kotar, and for his bravery and actions was honored with the Order of the People's Hero and the Order of Bravery. Blažina died in action in Gorski Kotar, aged 20.

== Biography ==
Blažina was born on 10 March 1925 in the small village of Čemparovica in the hinterland of Labin, Istria.

Blažina joined the partisan movement after the capitulation of Italy. He took part in sabotage operations in the area around Labin, including the demolition of telephone lines from Labin to Nedešćina, the digging of roads, the demolition of bridges near Raša, Barban and Potpićan, the bombing of the Vlaška thermal power plant, and the removal of explosives from gunpowder in Ripenda.

He entered the 1st Company of the 1st Battalion in Čepić (part of the Učka detachment, founded in April 1944) as a machine gunner. In July the detachment moved to Bujština by order of the Operational Headquarters for Istria.

On 6 August 1944 Blažina, who could speak German, and three comrades dressed as Nazi soldiers, and disarmed by trick the crew of the carabinieri in Kanegra near Savudrija, where they found rifles, machine guns, pistols and ammunition. At the end of August, the 1st Battalion of the Detachment moved to Čabar. There, on 29 August 1941, they founded the 3rd brigade and 43rd Division. Blažina fought with the brigade in Gorski kotar and the hinterland of Rijeka until April 1945. He was decorated for bravery.

Blažina was killed in action in Gorski Kotar, with the rank of sergeant. He was proclaimed a national hero in 1953.
