= Blagoj Stračkov =

- Благој Страчков
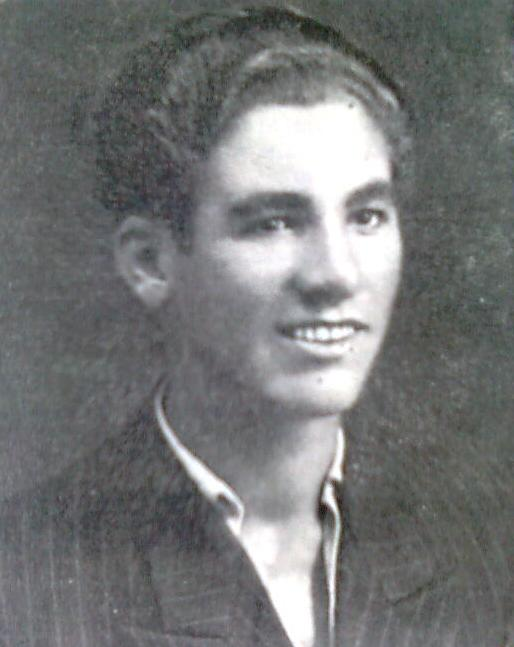
- Born: 29 February 1920; Veles, Kingdom of Yugoslavia
- Died: 13 January 1943 (aged 22); Veles, Kingdom of Bulgaria
- Occupation: worker
- Political party: Communist Party of Yugoslavia (since 1940)

Blagoj Stračkov (Macedonian: Благој Страчков; 1920–1943) was a Macedonian national hero, Yugoslavian partisan who died during World War II.

== Biography ==
Stračkov was born in Veles on 29 February 1920 in a poor Macedonian family. After he finished his primary education he started looking for a job. He spent his childhood working on the fields, working it the quarry, etc. He became a member of the syndicate and he took part in many demonstrations and strikes.

The Communist Party of Yugoslavia saw his activities, while he was working in the syndicate so, he became a member of League of the Communist Youth of Yugoslavia (SKOJ) and at the end of the year he became a member of the Communist Party of Yugoslavia (KPJ). When the war started and Bulgarian occupiers went to Veles, Stračkov was chosen as a member for the local committee of KPJ in Veles and secretary of the local committee of SKOJ. During 1941 and 1942 he contacted many people because the most important priority was to form a partisan detachment. The detachment was formed in April 1942. Stračkov was working on popularization of the detachment and accepting new members.

All these activities have contributed his stay in Veles to be very dangerous for his life so in September 1942 he became a member of the Partisan Detachment "Dimitar Vlahov". The detachment has 3 bands and Stračkov was political commissar of the Second band. He organized meetings where he was calling the local people to expel the occupiers fighting against them. In December 1942, the Bulgarian occupiers started to work on decomposition of the detachment. One of that was the separation of the detachment near Zelenikovo. Stračkov with one group of partisans had to go to Black Mountain of Skopje (Skopska Crna Gora) but because of the snow which there was plenty of it, they had to come back in the town. They were hiding in the town for a while because they were unable to contact the people from the party. After that they went to Rosoman where they have been seen and they were caught and taken to Veles military barracks. There they were tortured very badly. They were asking him everything but Stračkov did not answer anything. On 13 January 1943, Stračkov only said that the partisans would win the war. When the Bulgarian occupiers heard this they were very angry so the cut him alive on pieces and buried him alive.

On 11 October 1953, he was awarded the title National Hero of Yugoslavia and SR Macedonia by the president of Yugoslavia Josip Broz Tito in honor of his bravery.

== Literature ==
- Спомен книга на загинатите борци во НОБ и жртви на фашистичкиот терор од Велес и Велешко. „Просвета", Велес 1985.
- Народни хероји Југославије. „Младост", Београд 1975.
