= Ibe Palikuqi =

Yugoslav Partisan

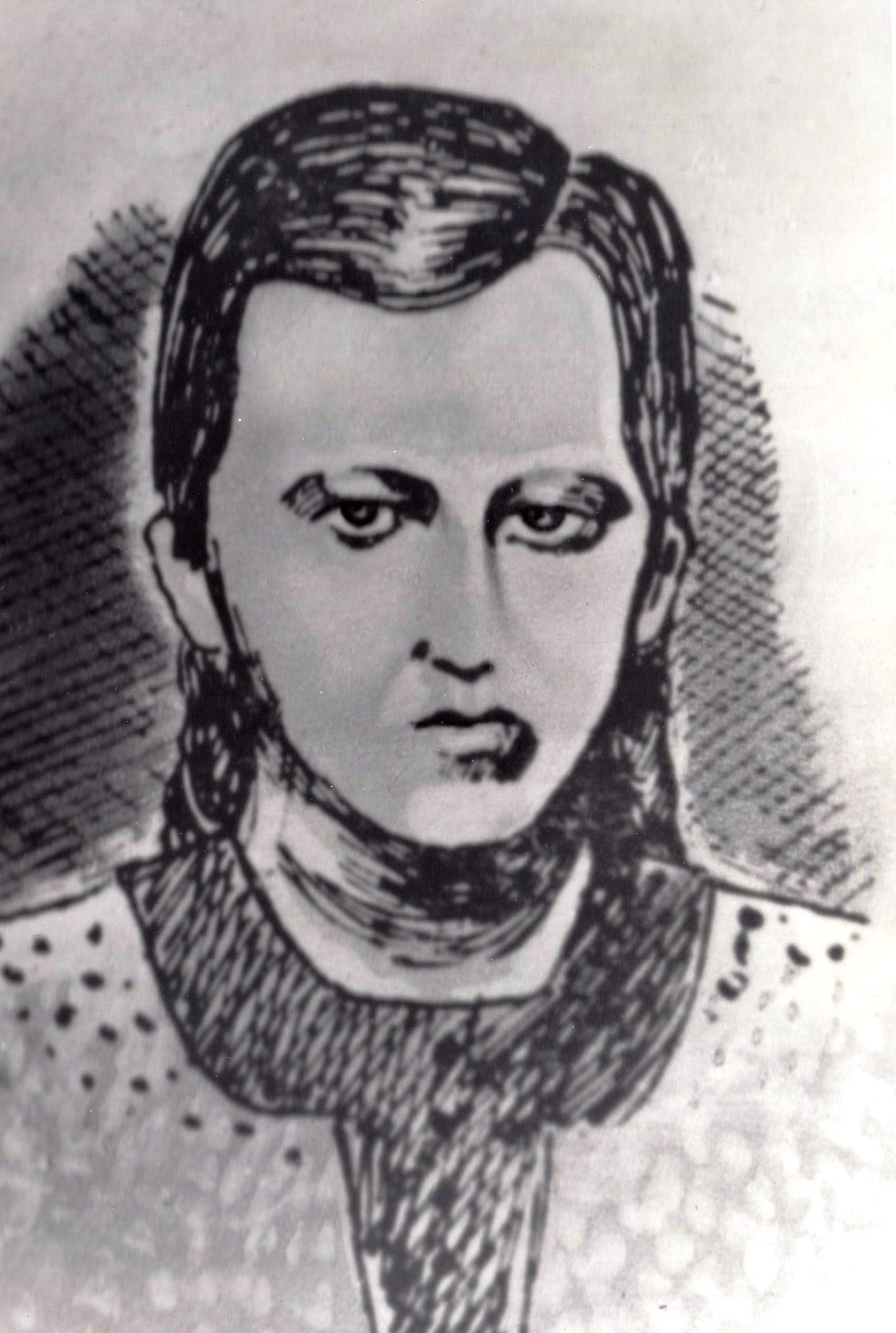
- Born: 1927 (age 98–99); Debar, Kingdom of Yugoslavia
- Died: September 22, 1944; Shutovo, Macedonia
- Cause of death: Combat injuries
- Other name: Ibe Sherif Palikuqi
- Citizenship: Kingdom of Yugoslavia
- Occupation: Partisan
- Awards: People's Hero of Yugoslavia (1953)

Ibe Palikuqi (Albanian: Ibe Palikuqi, Macedonian: Ибе Паликуќа) was a Yugoslav partisan and a member of the communist resistance in Vardar Macedonia. She is one of the seven partisans from Macedonia who have been declared national heroes of Yugoslavia and one of the youngest national heroes in Yugoslavia.

== Early life ==
Ibe Palikuqi was born in Debar, North Macedonia (former Kingdom of Yugoslavia) in 1927 to a middle-class Muslim family that held anti-fascist sentiments. Her father was a hodža, a Muslim priest, and her brother Eshtref was the first to join the liberation movement.

== Resistance activity ==
In 1941, Debar was captured and occupied by Italian fascists. In 1942, at the age of fifteen, Ibe joined the League of Communist Youth of Yugoslavia (SKOJ) and began working as a courier who carried letters, distributed leaflets, and transported illegal immigrants. Because her father was a hodža, she was not suspected of being a communist which allowed her to move around the city easily and hold meetings in her family home.

In 1943, she was accepted into the Communist Party of Yugoslavia (KPJ)

== Death ==
On September 20, 1944, on the outskirts of Kičevo, Ibe Palikuqi was fatally wounded in a battle against the Balli Kombëtar. After being surrounded by the Ballists and cut off from a route of retreat, Ibe Palikuqi and Zenal Paci lead a charge through the siege. After reaching the top of a hill, Ibe was shot and on September 22, two days later, succumbed to her wounds in Šutovo, Kičevo.

== Legacy ==
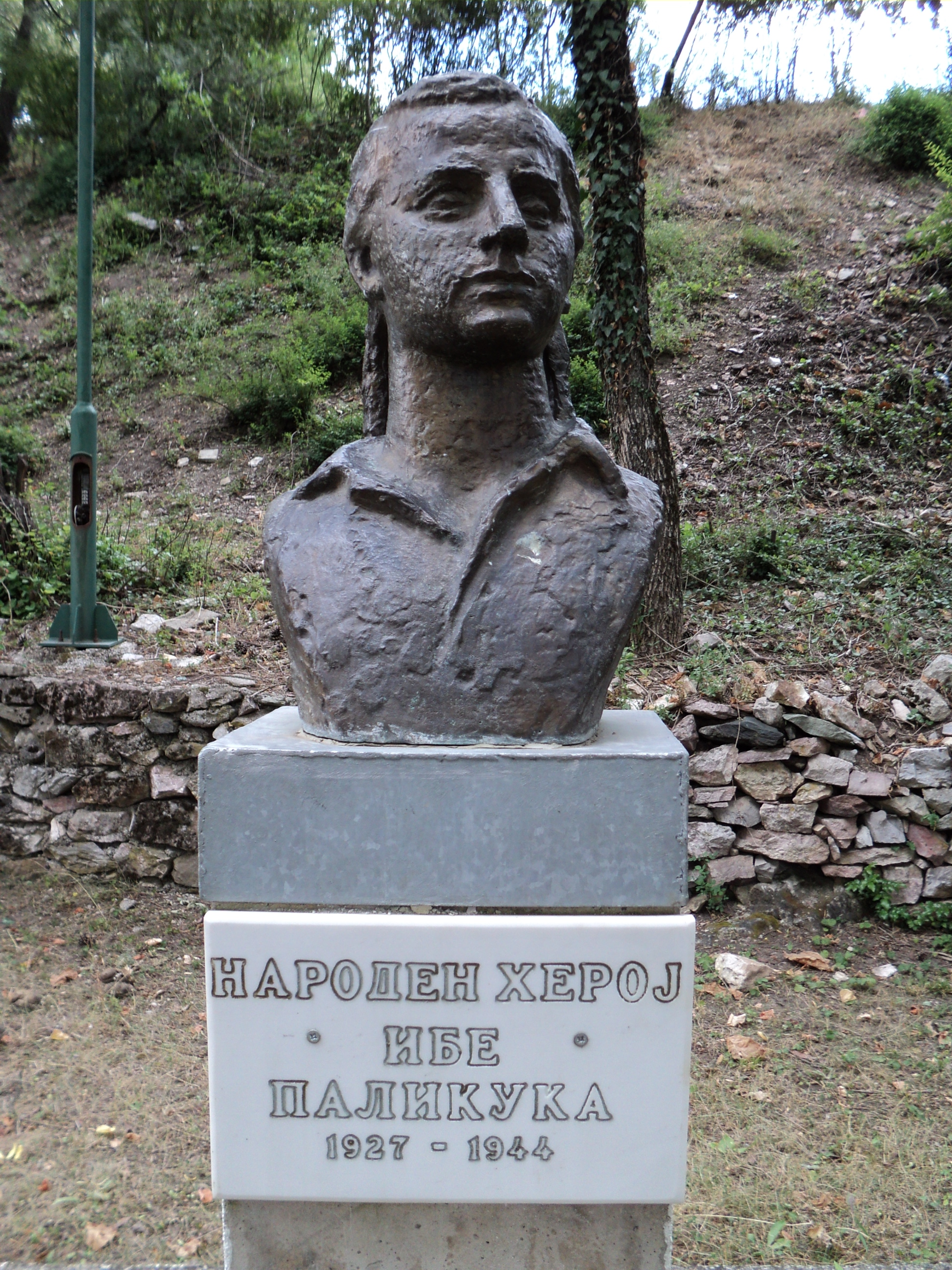
Bust of Ibe Palikuća in Kičevo.

On October 8, 1953, she was awarded the Order of the People's Hero of Yugoslavia.
