= Jelena Ćetković =

National Hero of Yugoslavia

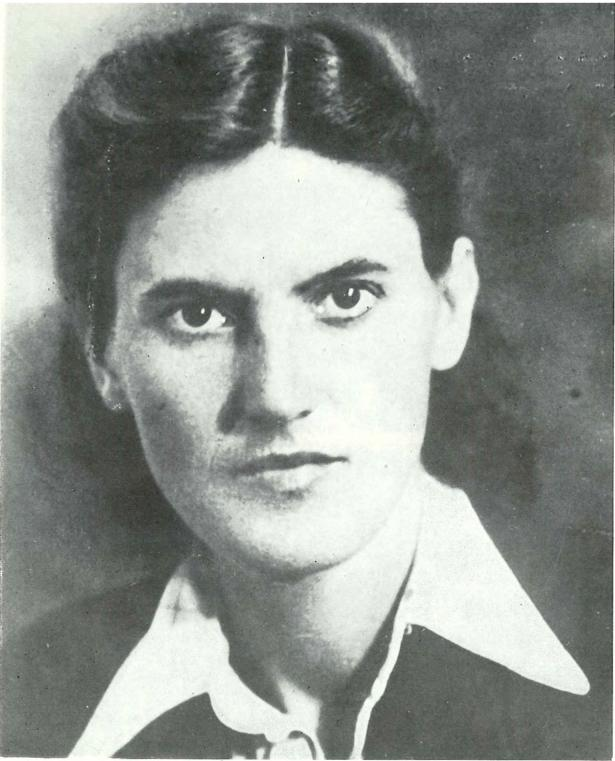
Jelena Ćetković

Jelena Ćetković (Serbian: Јелена Ћетковић; 21 August 1916 – 14 May 1943) was a Yugoslavian communist revolutionary and activist for women’s rights. During the World War II, she joined Yugoslav Partisans and participated in the People's Liberation War and was executed by the Nazis in 1943. After the war, she was proclaimed People's Hero of Yugoslavia. As other People's Heroes, she was held in high esteem during the communist rule in Yugoslavia, and many streets and schools were named after her.

== Biography ==
Ćetković was born on 21 August 1916 in Cetinje in the kingdom of Montenegro as the youngest child of Blagota and Gordana Ćetković. She had two elder brothers, Nikola and Đorđije. Shortly after her birth, the family moved to Podgorica and her father died from wounds sustained in the World War I.

After graduation, Ćetković enrolled in a women's crafts school where she learned tailoring crafts. As a young worker, she joined the worker movement. In 1933, she became a member of the League of Socialist Youth of Yugoslavia, and two years later, a member of the Communist Party of Yugoslavia (KPJ). She registered as a republican volunteer in the Spanish Civil War, but the police intercepted the volunteers and prevented their departure. Ćetković and her brother Đorđije were filed as communists by the police and because of this, they were often under surveillance, arrested and mistreated. They moved to Belgrade in 1938 where Ćetković continued her political activities. She was an instructor of the regional KPJ committee for Serbia and was responsible for working with women.

At the beginning of World War II, Ćetković was in a partisan unit in Bosnia, then in the Republic of Užice, where she worked with women. At the end of 1941, she returned to Belgrade where she worked as the secretary of the local KPJ committee and organized numerous activities, sabotages and diversions.

In 1942, Ćetković and her comrades planned to assassinate collaborationist police agent Đorđe Kosmajac. Assassination was planned for 6 March 1942, but on 3 March, Ćetković was arrested during a meeting the house on 43 Svetogorska street. During police interrogation, she was brutally tortured. The assassination was successfully carried out while she was interrogated. Few days later, the police found out that she was the main organizer of the assassination, which led to even more torture. During the beatings, her spine was damaged and she became paraplegic, but she still remained silent and police was unable to extort any information from her. On 11 April, she was transferred to the Banjica concentration camp where she spent a year. Ćetković was shot at the Jajinci shooting ground on 14 May 1943 together with 19 others.

During her imprisonment at the camp, Ćetković wrote a poem entitled Behind Bars which was saved and published in The Voice of the Unique National Liberation Front of Serbia in January 1944.

== Legacy ==
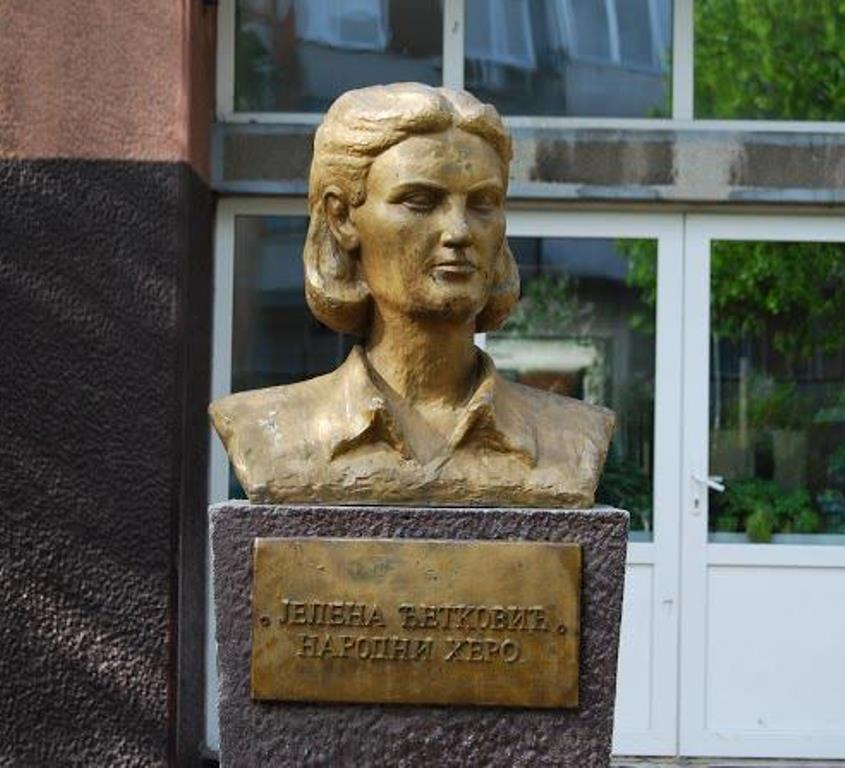
Bust of Jelena Ćetković in front of the "Jelena Ćetković" Elementary School in Belgrade

Ćetković was declared a People's hero of Yugoslavia on 5 May 1952. In the national theatre, a performance of „Jelena Ćetković“, produced by Boro Grigorović with inspiration from drama written by Aleksandar Petrović, was performed for twenty years. A television movie produced by Zdravko Šotra was also inspired by a drama with the same name. The movement to rescue Ivanka Muačević from the central state hospital the day after she gave birth inspired the episode Hospital, while the assassination attempt on Đorđe Kosmajac inspired the episode Traitor of the TV series Castaways.

The Jelena Ćetković street is located in Belgrade in the Stari Grad municipality. This street has borne her name since 1946. In 2002, the City Committee for Monuments, Street and Square named proposed this street be renamed, but the proposal was not accepted by the City Assembly. Streets named after Ćetković also exist in Kragujevac, Kraljevo, Lazarevac, Niš (Medijana), Podgorica, Požarevac, Šid, Subotica and Vranje.

There is a school named after Jelena Ćetković in the Belgrade municipality of Zvezdara at 26 Vranjska street. A bust of Ćetković by sculptor Dragutin Spasić stands in front of the school building.

In 1984, the Yugoslav Post issued a stamp commemorating Jelena Ćetković as part of the "Women Heroes" issue.

== Sources ==
- Sloboda, Aleksandar (1984). Jelena Ćetković. Belgrade: Narodna armija.
