= Order of the People's Hero =

Yugoslav gallantry medal (1942–1991)

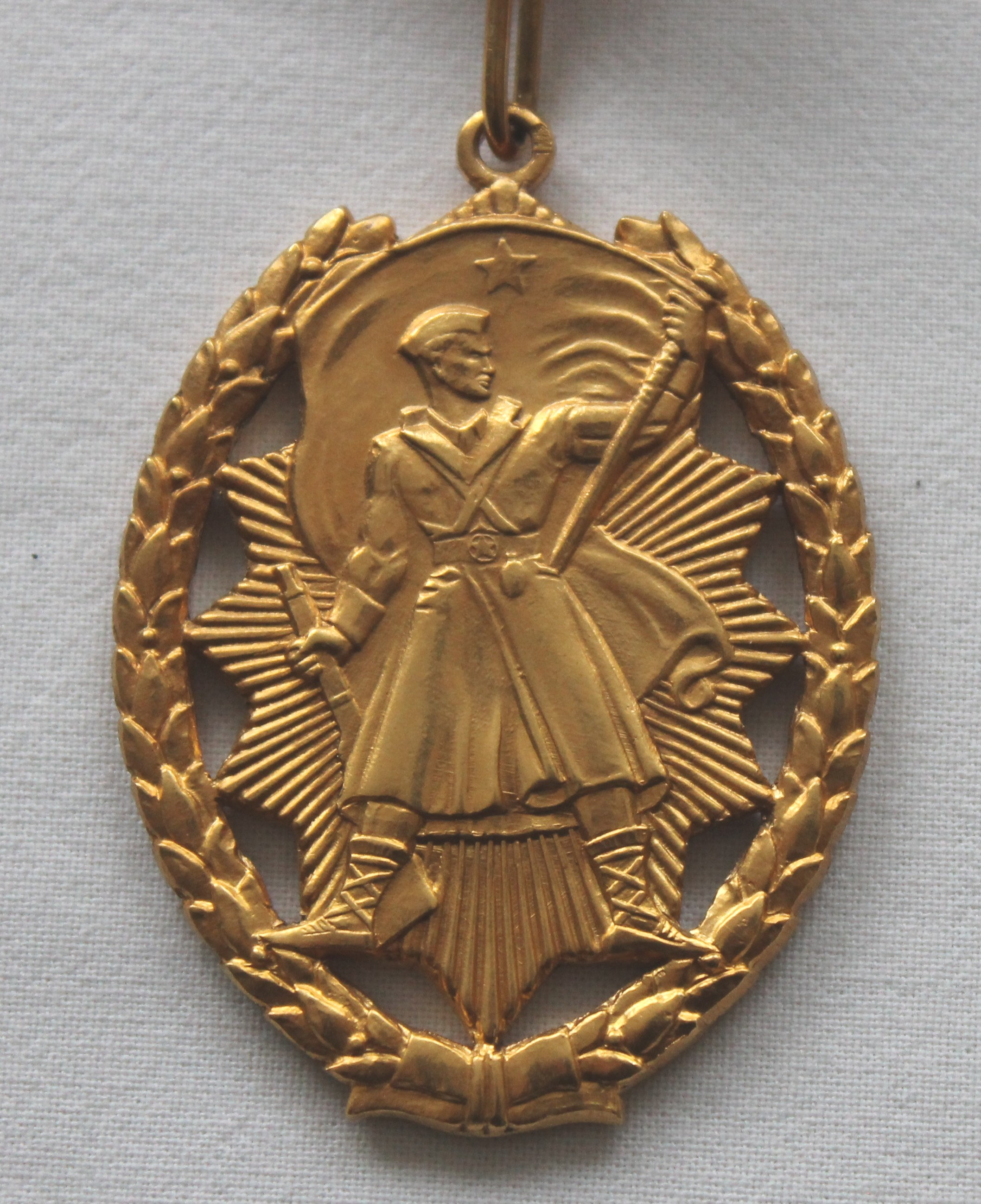
- Order of the People's Hero medal
- Type: Medal
- Awarded for: Distinguishing oneself by extraordinary heroic deeds
- Presented by: Yugoslavia
- Status: Incepted
- First award: 1942
- Final award: 1991 (Milan Tepić)

Highlights
- Total: Around 1,400
- ribbon

Precedence
- Next (higher): Highest (until 1955); Order of Freedom (after 1955)
- Next (lower): Order of Freedom (1945–1955); Order of the Hero of Socialist Labour (1955–1992)

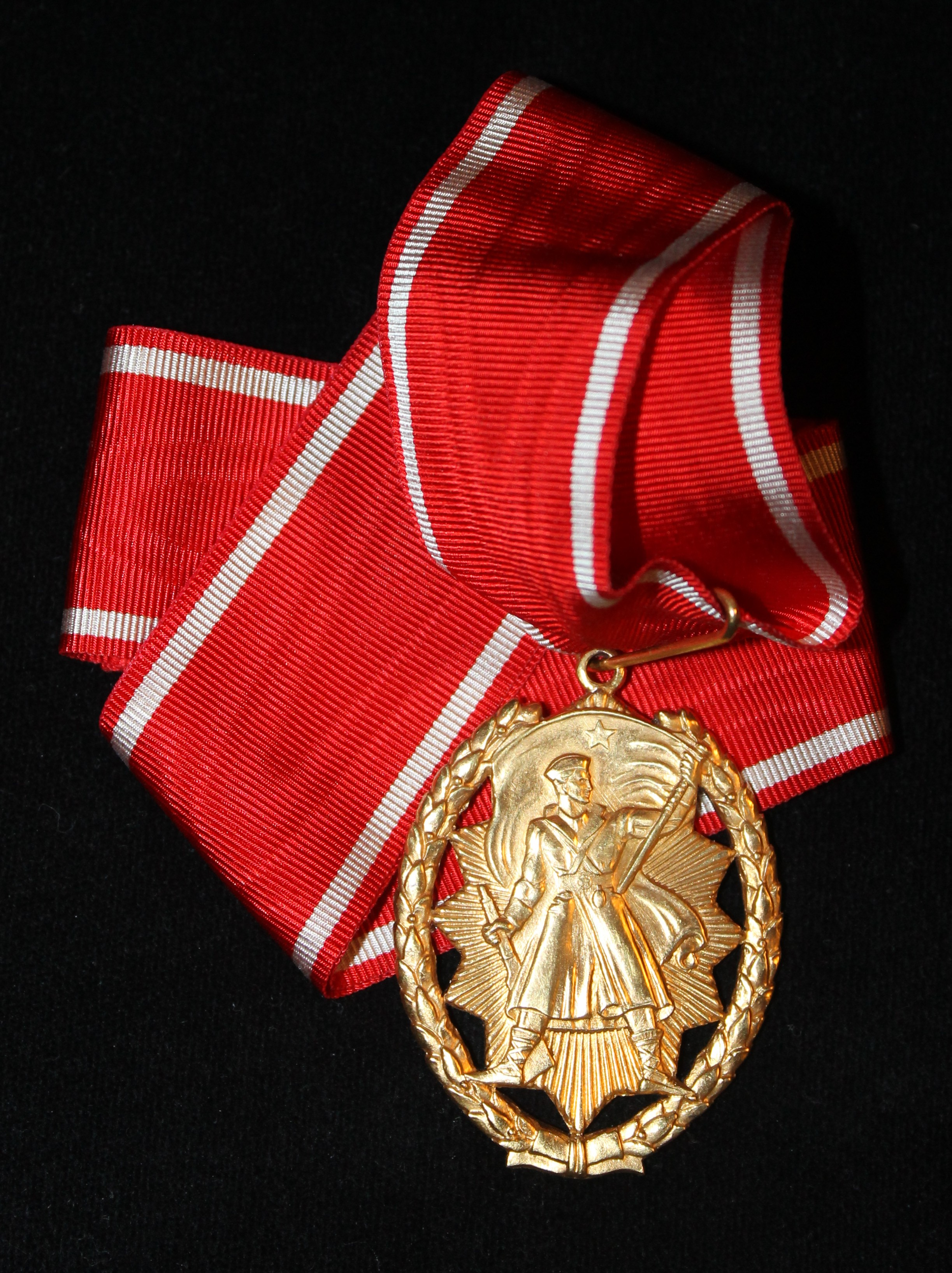
Order of the People's Hero.

The Order of the People's Hero or the Order of the National Hero (Serbo-Croatian: Orden narodnog heroja / Oрден народног хероја; Slovene: Red narodnega heroja, Macedonian: Oрден на народен херој, romanized: Orden na naroden heroj) was a Yugoslav gallantry medal, the second highest military award, and third overall Yugoslav decoration. It was awarded to individuals, military units, political and other organisations who distinguished themselves by extraordinary heroic deeds during war and in peacetime. The recipients were thereafter known as People's Heroes of Yugoslavia or National Heroes of Yugoslavia. The vast majority was awarded to partisans for actions during the Second World War. A total of 1,322 awards were awarded in Yugoslavia, and 19 were awarded to foreigners.

== History ==
The bulletin of the Supreme Command of the People's Liberation Army of Yugoslavia no. 12–13 (December 1941 and January 1942) announced the establishment of the title of "People's Hero" for heroic and self-sacrificing participants of the People's Liberation War. The first person to be awarded the title was Petar Leković. A total of 22 persons were awarded this title. On 15 August 1943, the title was formalized as an order together with Order of the People's Liberation, Order of Bravery, Order of the Partisan Star, Order of Brotherhood and Unity and the Medal for Bravery. At the same time, all the persons who already held the title of the People's Hero were awarded the order.

The Order consists of an oval gold badge showing a soldier with rifle and banner superimposed upon a rayed star surrounded by a wreath of laurel. The badge is suspended from a red ribbon, with a narrow white stripe towards each edge. The design for this and the other Orders were undertaken by the painter Đorđe Andrejević Kun and the sculptor Antun Augustinčić. Before 29 November 1943, the title of People's Hero was awarded by the Central Committee of the KPJ, after 1945 it was awarded by the Presidium of the People's Assembly of Yugoslavia, and starting in 1953 by the President of Yugoslavia.

From its inception until around 1993, the Order had been awarded nearly 1,400 times. Marshal Josip Broz Tito was awarded the Order three times: in 1944, 1972, and 1977. The holders of the order were entitled to certain benefits, like free fares on public transport, and pensions for the surviving family members of deceased people's heroes. Although the benefits have since been downscaled, post-Yugoslav countries still provide certain benefits to people's heroes. Many schools and streets in post-war Yugoslavia were named after people's heroes, and many of the names remain, to varying degrees in different successor countries.

Not only people, but cities, military units and organizations were also awarded the order. Eight cities in Yugoslavia were awarded the order and proclaimed "hero cities": Belgrade, Cetinje, Drvar, Ljubljana, Novi Sad, Prilep, Pristina, and Zagreb.

== Notable recipients ==
Because of the large number of awards, only people with Wikipedia articles are listed. The date of the award(s) is given in parentheses. Those marked with a dagger (†) died during the war. They were all awarded posthumously, except for Petar Leković, who was awarded the order before he died in WWII.

- Mirče Acev (1945†)
- Vera Aceva (1953)
- Božidar Adžija (1945†)
- Nisim Albahari (1953)
- Mihailo Apostolski (1953)
- Ljupčo Arsov (1953)
- Viktor Avbelj (1951)
- Maks Baće (1953)
- Vlado Bagat (1948†)
- Slobodan Bajić Paja (1952†)
- Filip Bajković (1953)
- Vladimir Bakarić (1952)
- Mitar Bakić (1951)
- Rajka Baković (1953†)
- Olga Ban (1973†)
- Aleš Bebler (1953)
- Anka Berus (1953)
- Milan Blagojević Španac (1945†)
- Vera Blagojević (1953†)
- Jakov Blažević (1953)
- Antun Blažić (1951†)
- Mate Blažina (1953†)
- Hasan Brkić (1953)
- Zvonko Brkić (1953)
- Josip Broz Tito (1944, 1972, 1977)
- Boško Buha (1951†)
- Rade Bulat (1953)
- Marija Bursać (1943†)
- Anka Butorac (1949†)
- Rudi Čajavec (1951†)
- Marijan Čavić (1953†)
- Zdravko Čelar (1942†)
- Jelena Ćetković (1952†)
- Rodoljub Čolaković (1953)
- Krste Crvenkovski (1953)
- Ljubo Čupić (1953†)
- Božidarka Kika Damjanović-Marković (1953)
- Peko Dapčević (1945)
- Karel Destovnik (1953)
- Milovan Đilas (1953, rescinded in 1957)
- Nada Dimić (1951†)
- Xhevdet Doda (1973†)
- Robert Domany (1953†)
- Dara Dragišić (1953†)
- Petar Drapšin (1953)
- Andreana Družina (1953)
- Ratomir Dugonjić (1953)
- Emin Duraku (1952†)
- Ovadya Estreya (1953†)
- Stjepan Filipović (1949†)
- Čede Filipovski Dame (1949)
- Ivan Gošnjak (1953)
- Petar Gračanin (1951)
- Čedo Grbić (1951)
- Janko Gredelj (1951†)
- Fadil Hoxha (1953)
- Većeslav Holjevac (1951)
- Avdo Humo (1953)
- Lizika Jančar (1953†)
- Vlado Janić Capo (1951)
- Blagoj Jankov Mučeto (1951†)
- Vera Jocić (1951†)
- Kuzman Josifovski Pitu (1945†)
- Blažo Jovanović (1952)
- Radovan Jovanović (1951†)
- Žikica Jovanović Španac (1945†)
- Olga Jovičić (1951†)
- Jovo Kapičić (1950)
- Osman Karabegović (1952)
- Elpida Karamandi (1951†)
- Edvard Kardelj (1951)
- Boris Kidrič (1952)
- Đuro Kladarin (1952)
- Filip Kljajić (1944†)
- Franjo Kluz (1948†)
- Fana Kochovska (1953)
- Lazar Koliševski (1952)
- Rade Končar (1942†)
- Sava Kovačević (1943†)
- Veljko Kovačević (1951)
- Boris Kraigher (1953)
- Josip Kraš (1945†)
- Branko Krsmanović (1945†)
- Vicko Krstulović (1952)
- Dušan Kveder (1952)
- Petar Leković (1942†)
- Franc Leskošek (1952)
- Nikola Ljubičić (1953)
- Ivan Maček (1952)
- Vahida Maglajlić (1951†)
- Miha Marinko (1953)
- Moma Marković (1953)
- Veselin Masleša (1951†)
- Sergej Mašera (1973†)
- Petar Matić Dule (1951)
- Mile Mećava (1953†)
- Cvijetin Mijatović (1953)
- Veljko Milatović (1953)
- Danica Milosavljevic (1953)
- Ivan Milutinović (1953†)
- Miloš Minić (1953)
- Milutin Morača (1951)
- Dušan Mugoša (1953)
- Mara Naceva (1953)
- Kosta Nađ (1951)
- Stefan Naumov (1945†)
- Nada Naumović (1951†)
- Gojko Nikoliš (1951)
- Jordan Nikolov Orce (1945†)
- Marko Orešković (1945†)
- Đorđije Pajković (1953)
- Ibe Palikuqi (1953†)
- Boško Palkovljević (1943†)
- Đoko Pavićević (1953)
- Kata Pejnović (1968)
- Slobodan Penezić (1952†)
- Vladimir Perić (1953†)
- Dušan Petrović Šane (1952)
- Moša Pijade (1953)
- Strašo Pindžur (1945†)
- Bojan Polak (1952)
- Koča Popović (1953)
- Miladin Popović (1946†)
- Vladimir Popović (1952)
- Janko Premrl (1944†)
- Ognjen Prica (1945†)
- Slobodan Princip (1942†)
- Đuro Pucar (1951)
- Lepa Radić (1951†)
- Darinka Radović (1953†)
- Joakim Rakovac (1952†)
- Aleksandar Ranković (1945)
- Ivo Lola Ribar (1944†)
- Slavko Rodić (1949)
- Vladimir Rolović (1971)
- Franc Rozman (1944†)
- Ivan Rukavina (1951)
- Ramiz Sadiku (1945†)
- Vlado Šegrt (1951)
- Ivan Šibl (1951)
- Velimir Škorpik (1952†)
- Slavko Šlander (1943†)
- Milan Spasić (1973†)
- Mika Špiljak (1953)
- Drago Štajnberger (1943†)
- Petar Stambolić (1953)
- Dragi Stamenković (1953)
- Mladen Stojanović (1942†)
- Blagoj Stračkovski (1953†)
- Borko Temelkovski (1953)
- Milan Tepić (1991†)
- Hristijan Todorovski Karpoš (1945†)
- Vida Tomšič (1953)
- Jovan Veselinov (1952)
- Veljko Vlahović (1953)
- Rada Vranješević (1951†)
- Majda Vrhovnik (1951†)
- Bogdan Vujošević (1953)
- Ratko Vujović (1953)
- Svetozar Vukmanović (1951)
- Boro Vukmirović (1945†)
- Žarko Zrenjanin (1944†)
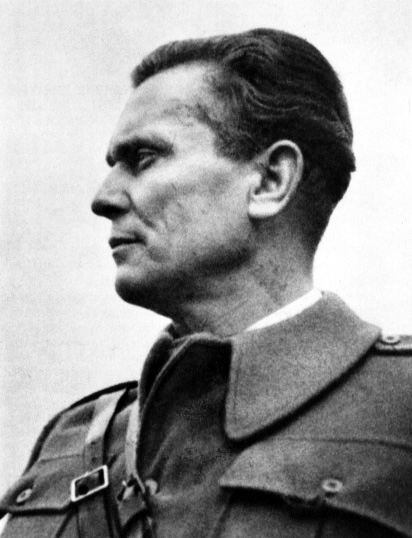
Josip Broz Tito was awarded the order three times.

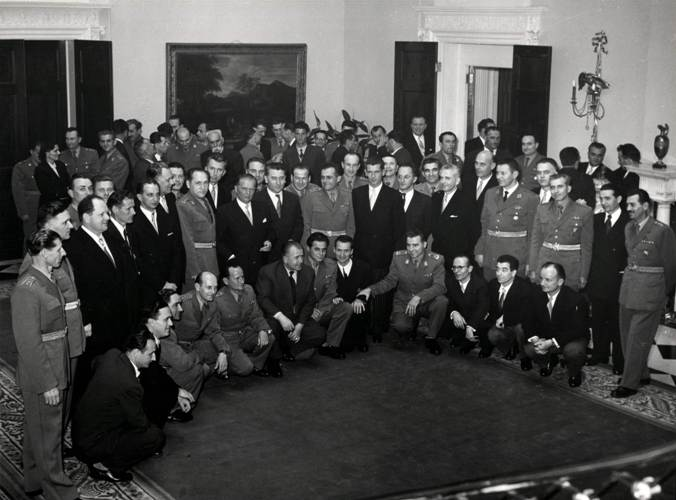
President Tito with People's Heroes from PR Bosnia and Herzegovina (1955)

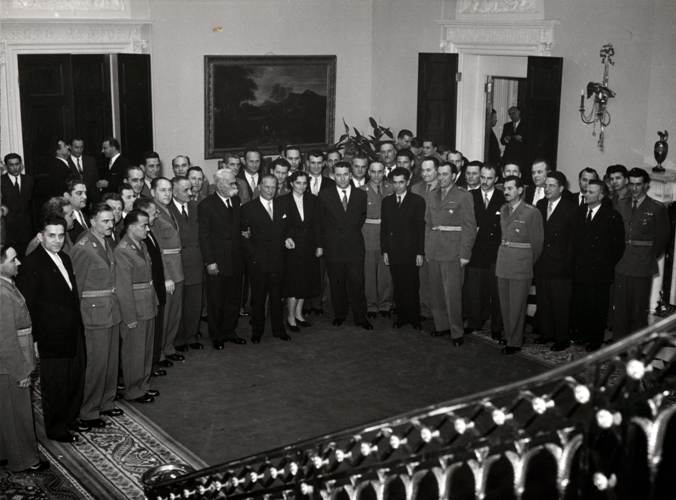
President Tito with People's Heroes from PR Montenegro (1955)

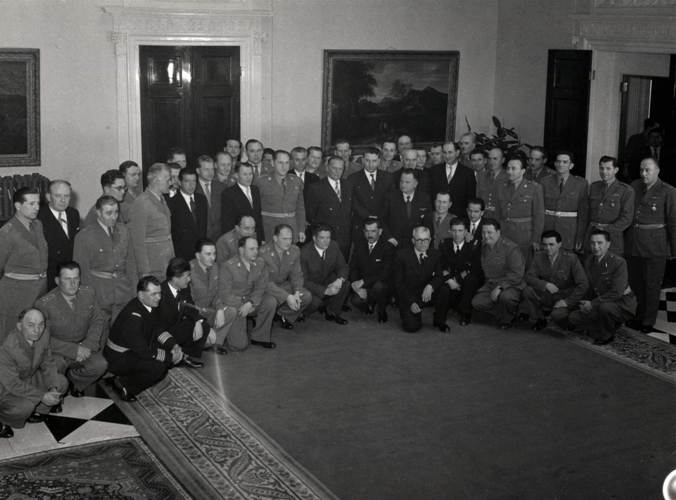
President Tito with People's Heroes from PR Croatia (1955)

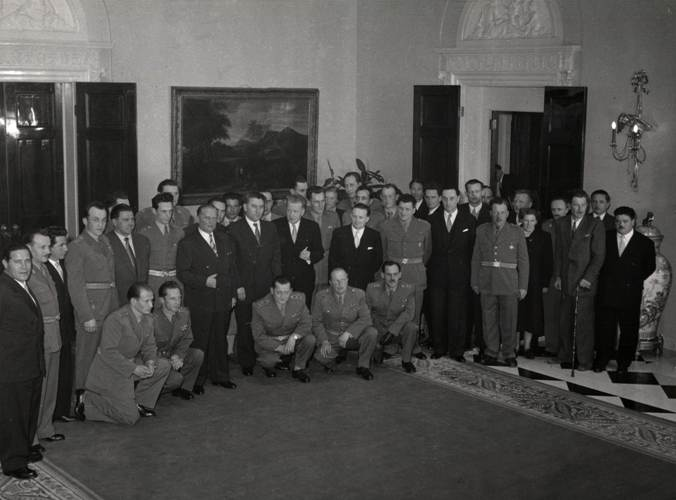
President Tito with People's Heroes from PR Slovenia (1955)

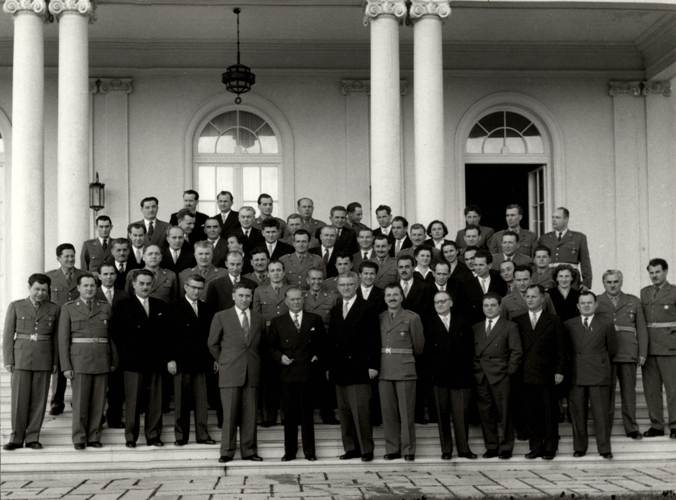
President Tito with People's Heroes from PR Serbia and PR Macedonia (1955)

=== Foreign citizens ===
- (Soviet Union) Sergey Biryuzov (1964)
- (Soviet Union) Ivan Bulkin (1945)
- (Albania) Reshit Çollaku (1945†, rescinded in 1948)
- (Soviet Union) Pavel Dmitrienko (1945)
- (Albania) Enver Hoxha (1946, rescinded in 1948)
- (Soviet Union) Boris Kalinkin (1944)
- (Soviet Union) Ivan Konstantinov (1945)
- (Soviet Union) Semyon Kozak (1944)
- (Albania) Vojo Kushi (1945†, rescinded in 1948)
- (Italy) Luigi Longo (1980)
- (Soviet Union) Rodion Malinovsky (1964)
- (Soviet Union) Alexander Managadze (1945)
- (Soviet Union) Grigoriy Okhrimenko (1945)
- (Soviet Union) Alexander Shornikov (1944)
- (Soviet Union) Vladimir Sudets (1964)
- (Czechoslovakia) Ludvík Svoboda (1946)
- (Soviet Union) Fyodor Tolbukhin (1945)
- (Soviet Union) Vasiliy Ulisko (1945)
- (Soviet Union) Andrey Vitruk (1945)
- (Soviet Union) Pavel Yakimov (1944)
- (Soviet Union) Vladimir Zhdanov (1944)
- (Poland) Michał Żymierski (1946)

=== Hero Cities ===
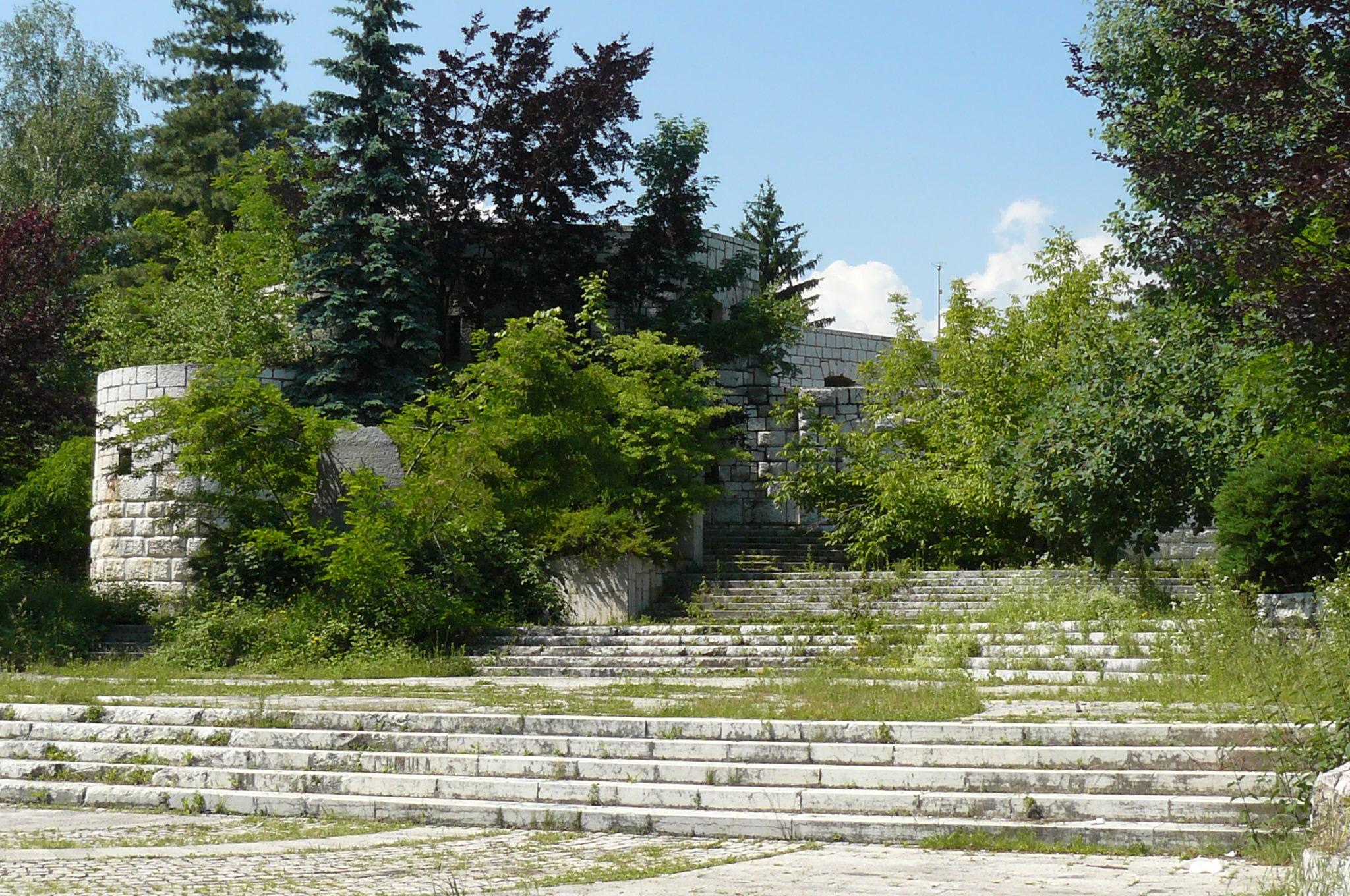
Vraca Memorial Park is located in Sarajevo, Bosnia and Herzegovina.

Eight cities were the Order of the People's Hero (one in each Socialist Republic and Socialist Province), and granted the title "Hero City". Dates of the award are given in parentheses.

- (Socialist Republic of Serbia) Belgrade (20 October 1974)
- (Socialist Republic of Montenegro) Cetinje (7 May 1975)
- (Socialist Republic of Slovenia) Ljubljana (7 May 1970)
- (Socialist Republic of Serbia) Novi Sad (7 May 1975)
- (Socialist Republic of Macedonia) Prilep (7 May 1975)
- (Socialist Republic of Serbia) Priština (7 May 1975)
- (Socialist Republic of Bosnia and Herzegovina) Drvar (17 May 1974)
- (Socialist Republic of Croatia) Zagreb (history) (7 May 1975)

=== Public and political organizations ===
- Young Communist League of Yugoslavia (SKOJ)
- District committee of SKOJ for Drvar
- Union of Veterans of People's Liberation War (SUBNOR)
- Union of the Spanish War veterans of Yugoslavia

=== World War II military units ===
- Brigades
  - 1st Proletarian Strike Brigade (1958)
  - 2nd Proletarian Strike Brigade (1958)
  - 3rd Proletarian (Sandžak) Strike Brigade (1958)
  - 4th Proletarian (Montenegrin) Strike Brigade (1958)
  - 5th Proletarian (Montenegrin) Strike Brigade (1958)
  - 6th Proletarian (East Bosnian) Strike Brigade (1958)
  - 1st Lika Proletarian Strike Brigade (1977)
  - 2nd Lika Proletarian Strike Brigade (1977)
  - 3rd Lika Proletarian Strike Brigade (1974)
  - 1st Krajina Proletarian Strike Brigade (1975)
  - 3rd Krajina Proletarian Strike Brigade (1958)
  - 7th Krajina Strike Brigade (1958)
  - 1st Dalmatian Proletarian Strike Brigade (1958)
  - 2nd Dalmatian Proletarian Strike Brigade (1958)
  - 3rd Dalmatian Strike Brigade (1958)
  - 12th Slavonian Proletarian Strike Brigade (1977)
  - 13th Proletaraian Strike Brigade "Rade Končar" (1972)
  - 1st Slovenian Proletarian Brigade "Tone Tomšič" (1974)
  - 2nd Slovenian People's Liberation Strike Brigade "Ljubo Šercer" (1979)
  - 10th Herzegovinian Strike Brigade (after 1952: 17th Proletarian) (1958)
  - 1st Vojvodina Strike Brigade (after 1958: 18th Proletarian) (1973)
  - 1st Macedonian-Kosovan Proletarian Strike Brigade (after 1951: 15th Proletarian)
  - 3rd Serbian Proletarian Brigade (1977)
  - 7th Banijan Strike Brigade "Vasilj Gačeša" (1958)
  - 8th Banijan Strike Brigade (1958)
  - 16th Banijan Strike Brigade (1958)
  - 15th Majevica Strike Brigade (1958)
- Battalions and regiments
  - 2nd Krajina People's Liberation Partizan Regiment "Dr Mladen Stojanović" (1972)
  - Escort Battalion of the Supreme Command of People's Liberation Army of Yugoslavia (1958)
  - Workers' Battalion of the Užice People's Liberation Partizan Regiment (1979)
- Army institutions
  - Central Hospital of People's Liberation Army of Yugoslavia (1968)
  - Partizan Hospital on Petrova Gora (1971)
  - Security and Intelligence Service (Varnostno-obveščevalna služba)

== Statistics ==
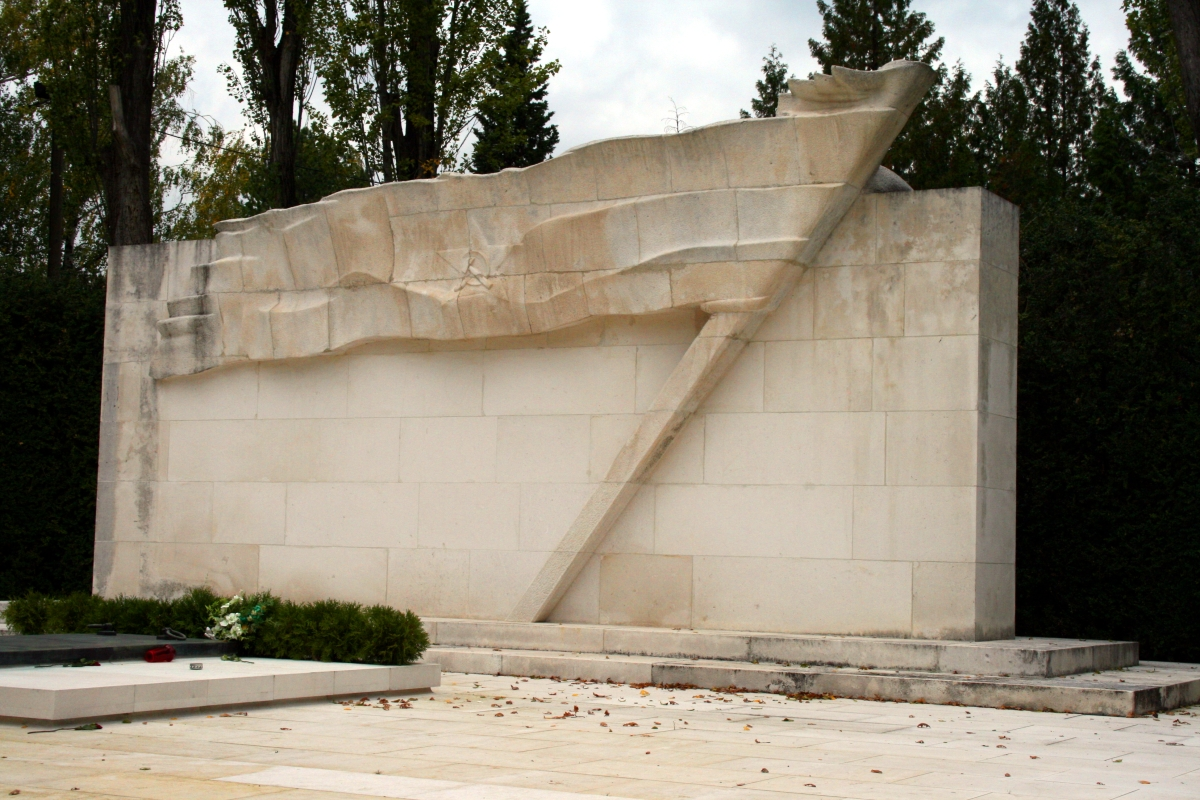
Tomb of the People's Heroes at Zagreb's Mirogoj Cemetery.

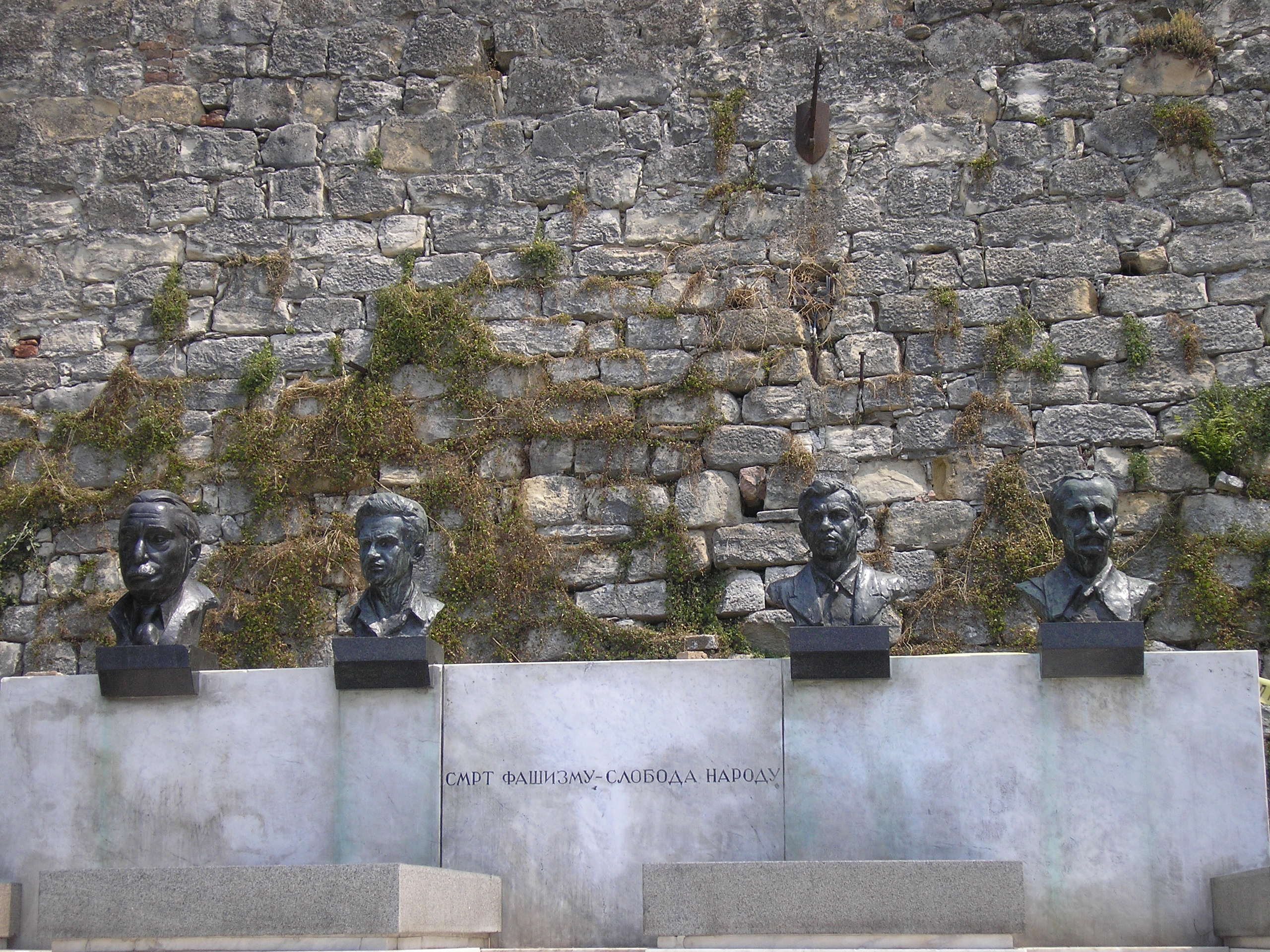
Tomb of the People's Heroes at Belgrade fortress contains graves of Ivo Lola Ribar, Ivan Milutinović, Đuro Đaković and Moše Pijade.

A total of 1,322 persons were awarded in Yugoslavia by 1981. Most of the awarded were men (1231) and 91 were women. Most People's Heroes were either miners or industrial workers (34%), 19% were university and high school students, 18% were farmworkers and 13% were experts of all kinds.

Most of the awarded were very young. Half of them joined the Army before their 25th birthday, and only 325 of them were over 30. 42% of the Heroes who died in the war were between 16 and 26 years old, 38% were between 27 and 34. Three Heroes were less than 17 years old when they died. Milka Bosnić was the youngest recipient of the order, she was just 15 when killed during the Raid on Drvar.

Most recipients were awarded in the years following World War II, most of them between 1951 and 1953. Tito was the only person to be awarded multiple times, he was awarded the order three times. Of the 955 recipients who died in the war, 77% were killed in combat, about 15% were executed or died in prison, and about 7% died from wounds. Most of the Heroes died in 1943 (about 30%) and in 1942 (27.5%). Nine of them were killed after the war officially ended during the fight with the remaining enemy forces. 55 People's Heroes committed suicide to escape arresting.

Most of the recipients of the Order were born in Croatia (21.9%), followed by Bosnia and Herzegovina (20.6%), Montenegro (18.7%), Central Serbia (15%) and Slovenia (11.05%). Most of those who died during World War II died in Bosnia and Herzegovina (32%). In 1957 there were 410 living People's Heroes, in 1975 there were 367, and in 1981 there were 343 living Heroes. The last living woman recipient of the Order was Andreana Družina (1920–2021) and the last living overall was Petar Matić Dule (1920–2024).

== See also ==
- Orders and medals of Socialist Yugoslavia
- Order of the People's Hero (Federal Republic of Yugoslavia)
- Hero of the Soviet Union
  - Hero City
  - Hero Fortress
  - Hero of the Russian Federation
  - Hero of Belarus
  - Hero of Ukraine
  - People's Hero of Kazakhstan
- Hero of the Mongolian People's Republic
- Hero of the People (People's Socialist Republic of Albania)
- Hero of the People's Republic of Bulgaria
- Hero of the Czechoslovak Socialist Republic
- Hero of the Socialist Republic of Romania
- Hero of the Republic (North Korea)
- Hero of the Republic of Cuba
- List of People's Heroes monuments in: Bosnia and Herzegovina, Croatia, Montenegro, North Macedonia, Serbia and Slovenia

== Literature ==
- Narodni heroji Jugoslavije [People's Heroes of Yugoslavia] (PDF) (in Serbo-Croatian). Vol. 1. Belgrade: Mladost. 1975. Archived from the original (PDF) on 2011-07-28.
- Narodni heroji Jugoslavije [People's Heroes of Yugoslavia] (Encyclopedia) (in Serbo-Croatian). Vol. 2. Belgrade and Titograd: Partizanska knjiga, Narodna knjiga, Pobjeda. 1982.
