= Dara Dragišić =

Yugoslav partisan (1921–1944)

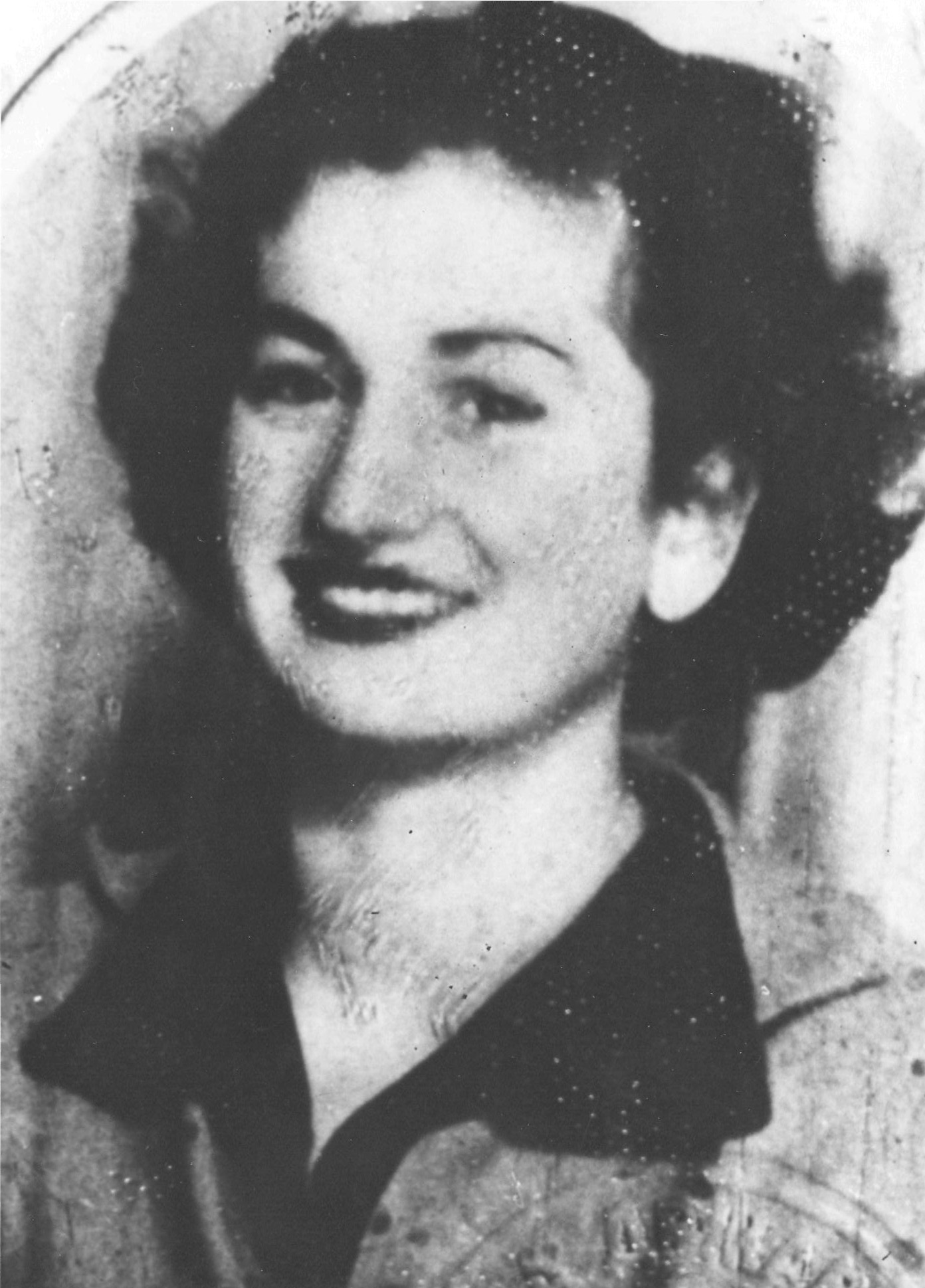
Dara Dragišić in 1944

Dara Dragišić (Serbian: Дара Драгишић; 1921–1944) was a Yugoslav partisan.

Dragišić was born in Sarajevo in 1921, the daughter of World War I lieutenant colonel Velimir Dragišić. She grew up in Peja. In World War II, she served with the Yugoslav resistance in the First Macedonian-Kosovo National Liberation Brigade. She participated in fighting at Klenovec, Kičevo, and Bukovac. Her right hand was seriously injured in June 1944. She was chosen by her platoon to be their political delegate. Dragišić was killed in battle on 22 September 1944.

Dragišić was awarded the Order of the People's Hero in 1953 for her participation in the war, and she was one of several Yugoslav partisans that was memorialized in folk songs over the following decades. All kindergartens in Peja were named in Dragišić's honor until 1999.
