= Nova International School Skopje =

- Меѓународно училиште НОВА Скопје
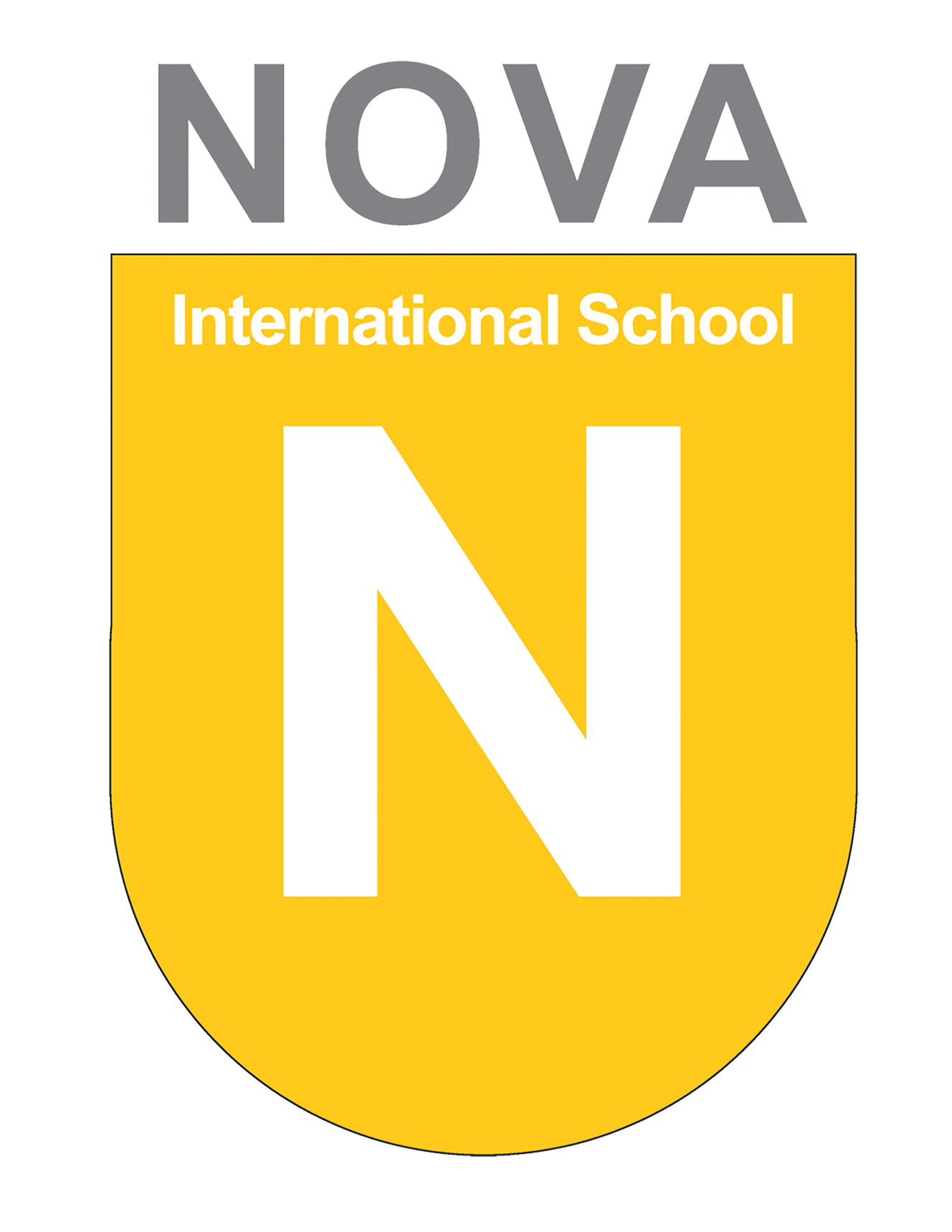

Location
- Prashka 27; 1000 Skopje; North Macedonia; 41.9989°N 21.3933°E

Information
- Established: 1997

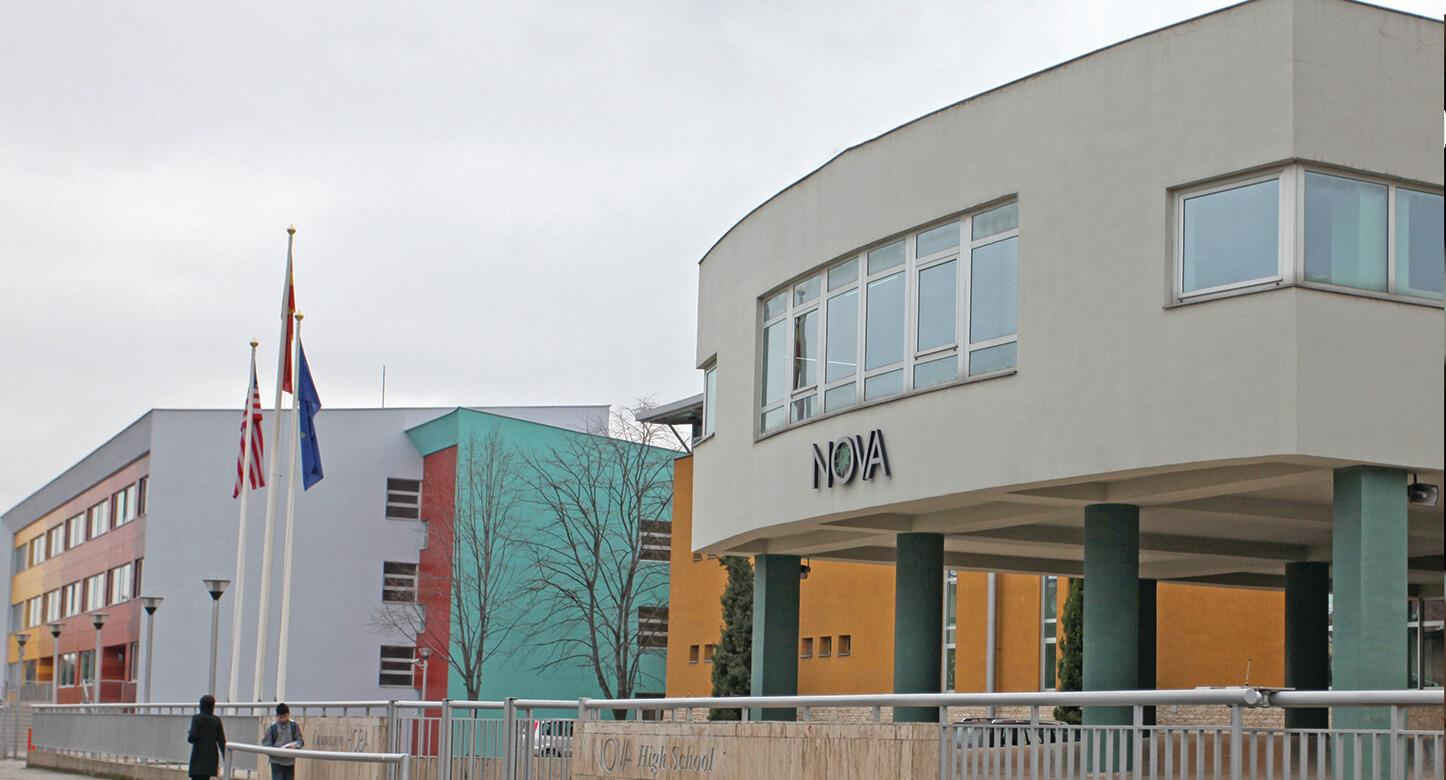
NOVA International Schools Front View

NOVA International School Skopje (Macedonian: Нова меѓународно училиште Скопје) is an independent, university-preparatory, coeducational, day school that offers an educational program from pre-kindergarten (three-year-olds) through grade 12.

The school was founded in 1997, and the campus is situated in a residential neighborhood in Karpoš.

The school year is divided into two semesters and extends from late August to mid-June. During the year students have a one-week fall break (October), a three-week winter break, a shorter (February) break, and a one-week spring break (April).
