= Blagoj Jankov Mučeto =

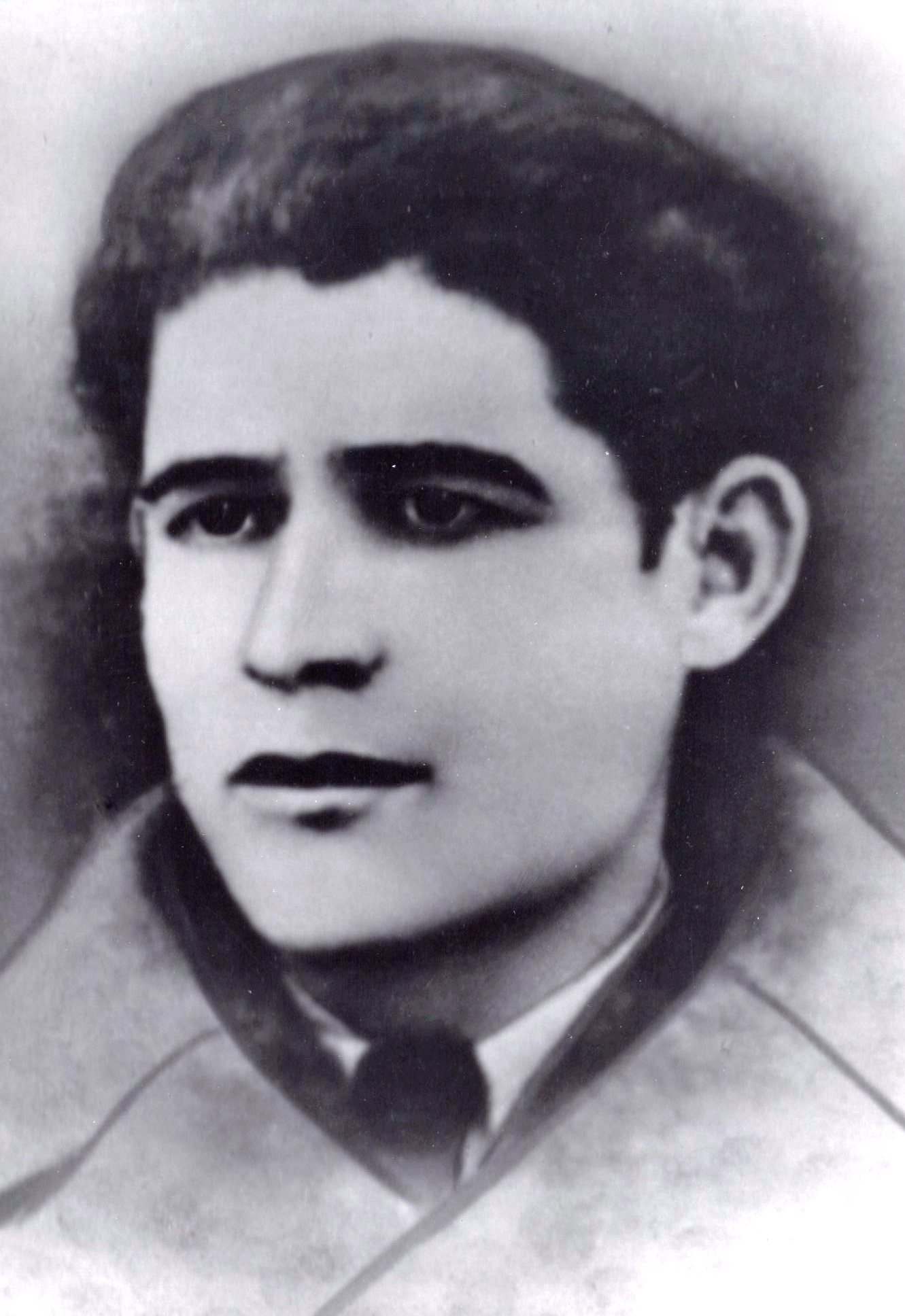
Blagoj Jankov Mučeto

Blagoj Jankov Mučeto (Macedonian: Благој Јанков Мучето) was a Macedonian partisan who fought in World War II. He was born in 1911 in Strumica, in the Salonica Vilayet of the Ottoman Empire (present-day Republic of Macedonia) and died on 14 July 1944 at the gates of the city park in Strumica while being chased by the Bulgarian police. He was declared a People's Hero of Yugoslavia The house where he was born and lived is now a memorial dedicated to him.

== Life ==
Blagoj Jankov Mučeto was born in 1911 in Strumica, into a poor working-class family. His father was Mincho Kocev, who died when he was four years old. His mother, Kumjanija, as a widow with two children, married Gone Jankov, after whom Blagoj received the surname Jankov.

Blagoj Jankov finished primary school in Strumica, and then enrolled in the Strumica gymnasium. While in primary school, he was often punished, sometimes with fines, for speaking Macedonian at school.
