= Račja Vas =

Račja Vas may refer to:

- Račja Vas, Slovenia, a village near Brežice
- Račja Vas, Croatia, a village near Lanišće
