= Volčje =

Volčje is a place name that may refer to:

- Volčje, Bloke, a village in the Municipality of Bloke, southern Slovenia
- Volčje, Brežice, a village in the Municipality of Brežice, southeastern Slovenia
