= Brezovica na Bizeljskem =

- Location in Slovenia
- Coordinates: 46°0′3.81″N 15°41′20.13″E
- Country: Slovenia
- Traditional region: Styria
- Statistical region: Lower Sava
- Municipality: Brežice

Area
  - Total: 1.44 km^{2} (0.56 sq mi)
- Elevation: 181.1 m (594 ft)

Population (2020)
  - Total: 105
  - Density: 72.9/km^{2} (189/sq mi)

Brezovica na Bizeljskem (pronounced [ˈbɾéːzɔʋitsa na biˈzéːlskɛm]; in older sources also Brezje, German: Birkdorf) is a settlement south of Bizeljsko in the Municipality of Brežice in eastern Slovenia. The area is part of the traditional region of Styria. It is now included in the Lower Sava Statistical Region. The settlement includes the hamlets of Gmajna, Stari Dom, Zaklen, and Kokotinjek.

== Name ==
The name of the settlement was changed from Brezovica to Brezovica na Bizeljskem in 1953. In the past the German name was Birkdorf.
