= Boršt, Brežice =

Boršt
- Location in Slovenia
- Coordinates: 45°53′6.71″N 15°33′2.37″E
- Country: Slovenia
- Traditional region: Lower Carniola
- Statistical region: Lower Sava
- Municipality: Brežice

Area
  - Total: 0.9 km^{2} (0.35 sq mi)
- Elevation: 153.2 m (503 ft)

Population (2020)
  - Total: 126
  - Density: 140/km^{2} (360/sq mi)

Boršt (pronounced [ˈbɔɾʃt]; German: Forst) is a small village on the left bank of the Krka River in the Municipality of Brežice in eastern Slovenia. The area is part of the traditional region of Lower Carniola. It is now included with the rest of the municipality in the Lower Sava Statistical Region.

== Name ==
The name Boršt is a relatively frequent name for settlements, regions, and hills in Slovenia. It is derived from the common noun boršt 'woods, forest', borrowed from Middle High German for(e)st 'woods, forest'. Boršt was attested in written sources as Vorst in 1343.
