= Bračna Vas =

- Location in Slovenia
- Coordinates: 46°0′51.06″N 15°42′19.77″E
- Country: Slovenia
- Traditional region: Styria
- Statistical region: Lower Sava
- Municipality: Brežice

Area
  - Total: 0.62 km^{2} (0.24 sq mi)
- Elevation: 158.5 m (520 ft)

Population (2020)
  - Total: 46
  - Density: 74/km^{2} (190/sq mi)

Bračna Vas (pronounced [ˈbɾaːtʃna ˈʋaːs]; Slovene: Bračna vas, German: Bratschendorf) is a small settlement on the right bank of the Sotla River in the Municipality of Brežice in eastern Slovenia. It lies northeast of Bizeljsko, right next to the border with Croatia. The area is part of the traditional region of Styria. It is now included in the Lower Sava Statistical Region.
