= Križe, Brežice =

Križe
- Location in Slovenia
- Coordinates: 46°0′52″N 15°33′40.01″E
- Country: Slovenia
- Traditional region: Styria
- Statistical region: Lower Sava
- Municipality: Brežice

Area
  - Total: 4.43 km^{2} (1.71 sq mi)
- Elevation: 428 m (1,404 ft)

Population (2020)
  - Total: 135
  - Density: 30.5/km^{2} (78.9/sq mi)

Križe (pronounced [ˈkɾiːʒɛ]) is a settlement in the Municipality of Brežice in eastern Slovenia. The area is part of the traditional region of Styria. It is now included in the Lower Sava Statistical Region.
