= Mali Cirnik, Brežice =

Mali Cirnik
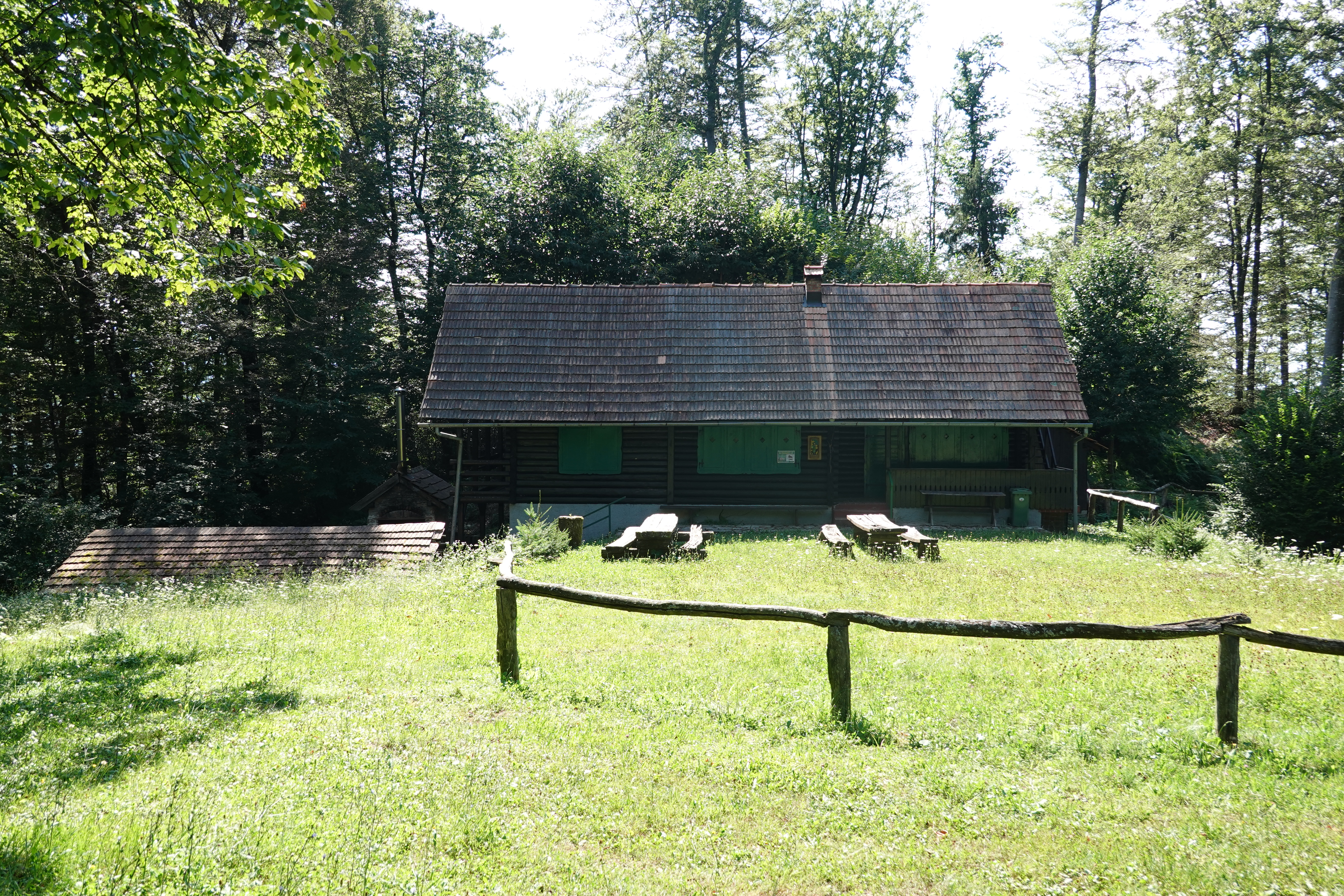

- Location in Slovenia
- Coordinates: 45°51′25.31″N 15°35′14.42″E
- Country: Slovenia
- Traditional region: Lower Carniola
- Statistical region: Lower Sava
- Municipality: Brežice

Area
  - Total: 1.26 km^{2} (0.49 sq mi)
- Elevation: 454.1 m (1,490 ft)

Population (2020)
  - Total: 0
  - Density: 0.0/km^{2} (0.0/sq mi)

Mali Cirnik (pronounced [ˈmaːli ˈtsiːɾnik]; German: Kleinzirnik) is a small remote settlement in the eastern Gorjanci Mountains in the Municipality of Brežice in eastern Slovenia, right on the border with Croatia. It no longer has any permanent residents. The area is part of the traditional region of Lower Carniola. It is now included in the Lower Sava Statistical Region.
