= Poštena Vas =

- Location in Slovenia
- Coordinates: 45°51′51.57″N 15°31′51.62″E
- Country: Slovenia
- Traditional region: Lower Carniola
- Statistical region: Lower Sava
- Municipality: Brežice

Area
  - Total: 0.58 km^{2} (0.22 sq mi)
- Elevation: 209.7 m (688 ft)

Population (2020)
  - Total: 48
  - Density: 83/km^{2} (210/sq mi)

Poštena Vas (pronounced [pɔˈʃteːna ˈʋaːs]; Slovene: Poštena vas) is a small village in the Municipality of Brežice in eastern Slovenia. The area is part of the traditional region of Lower Carniola. It is now included with the rest of the municipality in the Lower Sava Statistical Region.
