= Mali Vrh, Brežice =

Mali Vrh
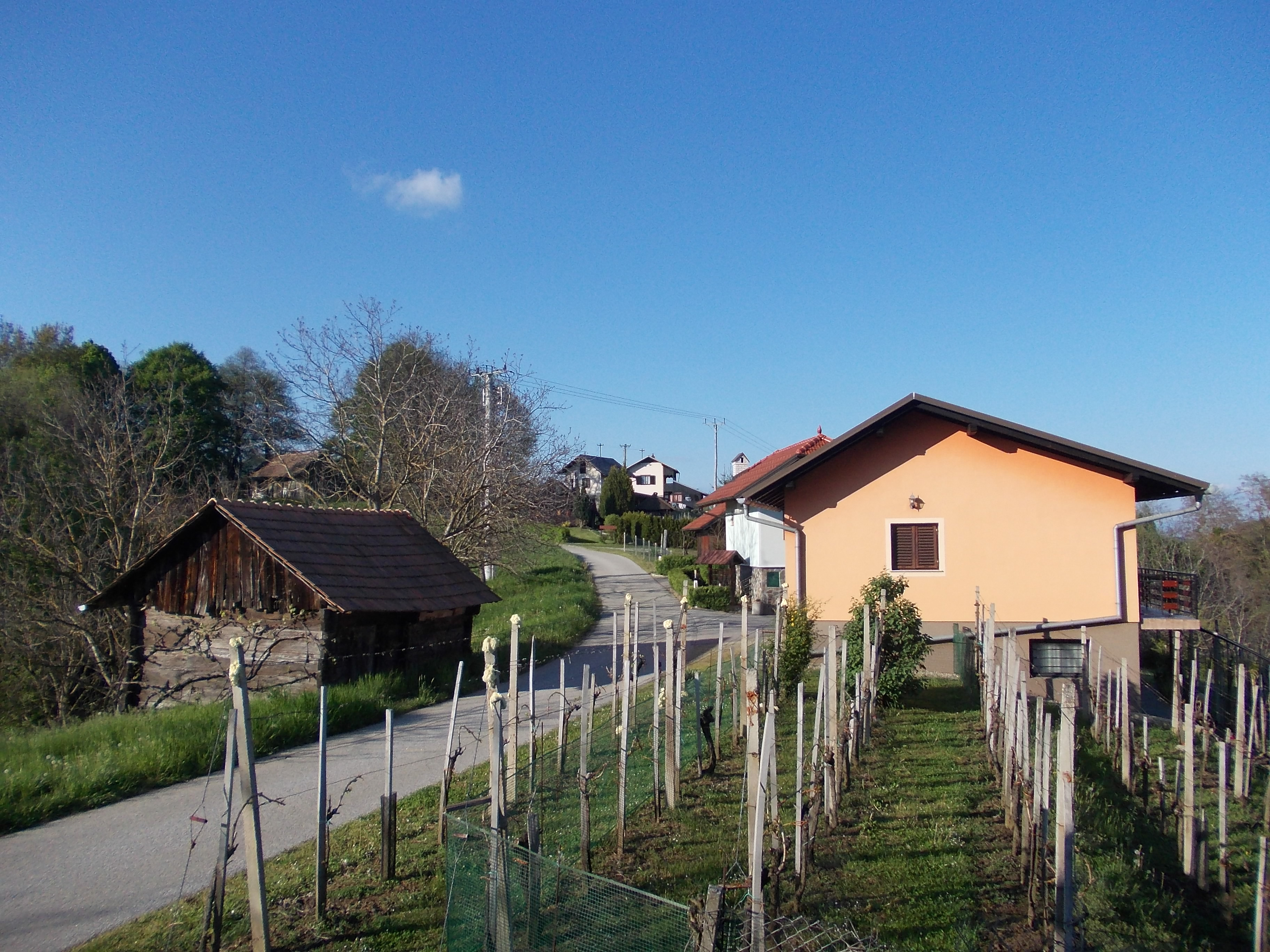

- Location in Slovenia
- Coordinates: 45°57′48.16″N 15°37′22.49″E
- Country: Slovenia
- Traditional region: Styria
- Statistical region: Lower Sava
- Municipality: Brežice

Area
  - Total: 2.91 km^{2} (1.12 sq mi)
- Elevation: 201.2 m (660 ft)

Population (2020)
  - Total: 285
  - Density: 97.9/km^{2} (254/sq mi)

Mali Vrh (pronounced [ˈmaːli ˈʋəɾx], German: Maliverh) is a settlement in the Municipality of Brežice in eastern Slovenia. The area is part of the traditional region of Styria. It is now included in the Lower Sava Statistical Region.

The local church is dedicated to Saint James and belongs to the parish of Pišece. It was built in the 17th century on the site of an earlier church. Its nave was extended around 1800. On August 3, 2021, the church tower collapsed onto the nave. The church had been damaged by a recent earthquake and aftershocks.
