= Mala Dolina =

- Location in Slovenia
- Coordinates: 45°51′26.46″N 15°39′37.29″E
- Country: Slovenia
- Traditional region: Lower Carniola
- Statistical region: Lower Sava
- Municipality: Brežice

Area
  - Total: 0.31 km^{2} (0.12 sq mi)
- Elevation: 227.4 m (746 ft)

Population (2020)
  - Total: 95
  - Density: 310/km^{2} (790/sq mi)

Mala Dolina (pronounced [ˈmaːla ˈdoːlina]; German: Kleindolina) is a small settlement in the Municipality of Brežice in eastern Slovenia. The area is part of the traditional region of Lower Carniola. It is now included in the Lower Sava Statistical Region.
