= Laze, Brežice =

Laze
- Location in Slovenia
- Coordinates: 45°51′2.39″N 15°38′0.59″E
- Country: Slovenia
- Traditional region: Lower Carniola
- Statistical region: Lower Sava
- Municipality: Brežice

Area
  - Total: 0.65 km^{2} (0.25 sq mi)
- Elevation: 326.6 m (1,072 ft)

Population (2020)
  - Total: 44
  - Density: 68/km^{2} (180/sq mi)

Laze (pronounced [ˈlaːzɛ]) is a small settlement in the eastern Gorjanci Mountains in the Municipality of Brežice in eastern Slovenia. The area is part of the traditional region of Lower Carniola. It is now included in the Lower Sava Statistical Region.
