= Prilipe =

- Location in Slovenia
- Coordinates: 45°52′38.8″N 15°37′25.05″E
- Country: Slovenia
- Traditional region: Lower Carniola
- Statistical region: Lower Sava
- Municipality: Brežice

Area
  - Total: 1.67 km^{2} (0.64 sq mi)
- Elevation: 177.1 m (581 ft)

Population (2020)
  - Total: 86
  - Density: 51/km^{2} (130/sq mi)

Prilipe (pronounced [ˈpɾiːlipɛ]) is a settlement in the Municipality of Brežice in eastern Slovenia. The area is part of the traditional region of Lower Carniola and is now included with the rest of the municipality in the Lower Sava Statistical Region.

There is a monument to the 1991 Ten-Day War by the main road in the settlement. It is a pyramid-shaped concrete monument representing anti-tank fortifications with a commemorative plaque, erected in 1996.
