= Stara Vas–Bizeljsko =

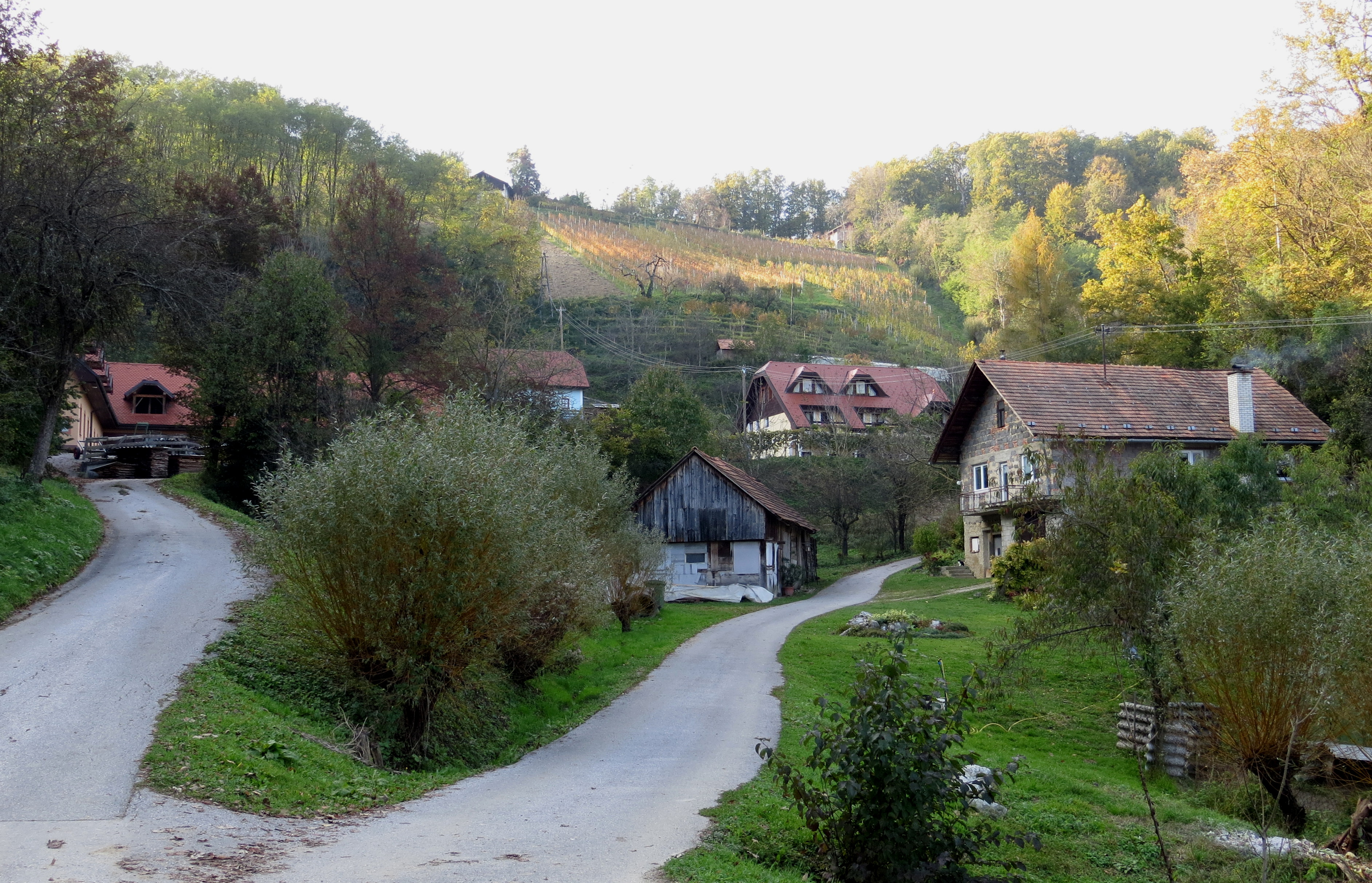

- Location in Slovenia
- Coordinates: 45°59′16.05″N 15°41′43.7″E
- Country: Slovenia
- Traditional region: Styria
- Statistical region: Lower Sava
- Municipality: Brežice

Area
  - Total: 4.47 km^{2} (1.73 sq mi)
- Elevation: 167.8 m (551 ft)

Population (2020)
  - Total: 252
  - Density: 56.4/km^{2} (146/sq mi)

Stara Vas–Bizeljsko (pronounced [ˈstaːɾa ˈʋaːs biˈzeːlskɔ]; Slovene: Stara vas-Bizeljsko, German: Altendorf) is a settlement on the right bank of the Sotla River in the Municipality of Brežice in eastern Slovenia, next to the border with Croatia. The area is part of the traditional region of Styria. It is now included with the rest of the municipality in the Lower Sava Statistical Region.
