= Koritno, Brežice =

Koritno
- Location in Slovenia
- Coordinates: 45°51′14.68″N 15°38′4.9″E
- Country: Slovenia
- Traditional region: Lower Carniola
- Statistical region: Lower Sava
- Municipality: Brežice

Area
  - Total: 3.97 km^{2} (1.53 sq mi)
- Elevation: 330.8 m (1,085 ft)

Population (2020)
  - Total: 100
  - Density: 25/km^{2} (65/sq mi)

Koritno (pronounced [kɔˈriːtnɔ]) is a village in the Municipality of Brežice in eastern Slovenia. It lies on the eastern edge of the Gorjanci Mountains. The area is part of the traditional region of Lower Carniola. It is now included in the Lower Sava Statistical Region.
