= Vinji Vrh, Brežice =

Vinji Vrh
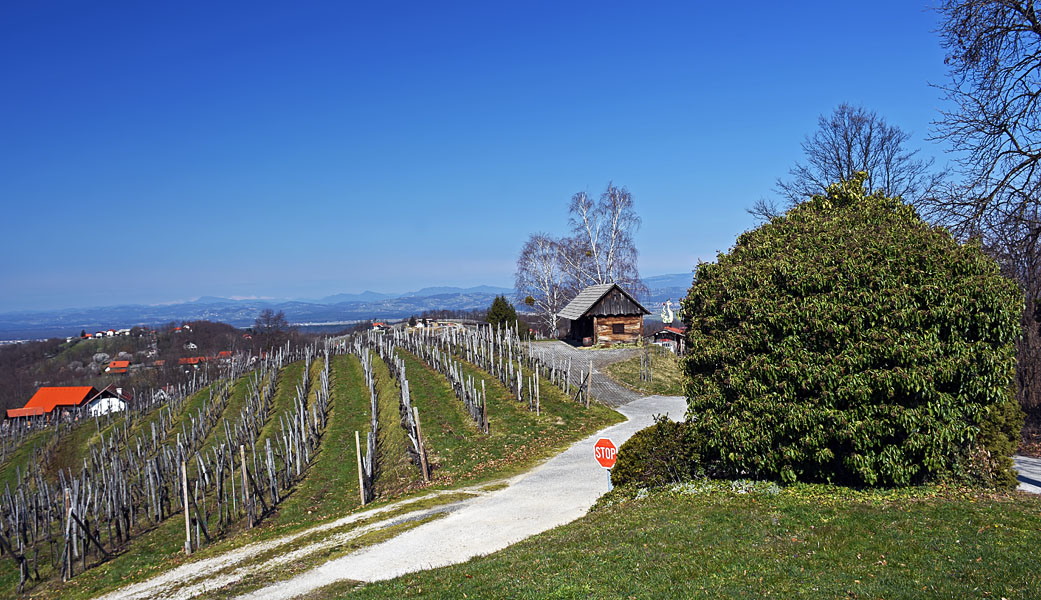
- Vineyards in the hamlet of Gadova Peč

- Location in Slovenia
- Coordinates: 45°51′12.78″N 15°31′35.02″E
- Country: Slovenia
- Traditional region: Lower Carniola
- Statistical region: Lower Sava
- Municipality: Brežice

Area
  - Total: 1.16 km^{2} (0.45 sq mi)
- Elevation: 296.3 m (972 ft)

Population (2020)
  - Total: 61
  - Density: 53/km^{2} (140/sq mi)

Vinji Vrh (pronounced [ˈʋiːnji ˈʋəɾx]) is a settlement in the eastern Gorjanci Hills in the Municipality of Brežice in eastern Slovenia, close to the border with Croatia. The area is part of the traditional region of Lower Carniola. It is now included with the rest of the municipality in the Lower Sava Statistical Region.
