= Mihalovec =

- Location in Slovenia
- Coordinates: 45°53′28.42″N 15°39′9.98″E
- Country: Slovenia
- Traditional region: Styria
- Statistical region: Lower Sava
- Municipality: Brežice

Area
  - Total: 2.57 km^{2} (0.99 sq mi)
- Elevation: 141.1 m (463 ft)

Population (2020)
  - Total: 285
  - Density: 111/km^{2} (287/sq mi)

Mihalovec (pronounced [miˈxaːlɔʋəts], German: Michalovetz) is a settlement on the left bank of the Sava River, south of Dobova in the Municipality of Brežice in eastern Slovenia. The area is part of the traditional region of Styria. It is now included in the Lower Sava Statistical Region.

Two graves in a small burial ground dating to the late 1st and early 2nd centuries AD have been excavated near the settlement. The adjacent remains of a Villa rustica confirm Roman occupation in the area.
