= Črešnjice pri Cerkljah =

- Location in Slovenia
- Coordinates: 45°53′31.67″N 15°30′41.13″E
- Country: Slovenia
- Traditional region: Lower Carniola
- Statistical region: Lower Sava
- Municipality: Brežice

Area
  - Total: 1.16 km^{2} (0.45 sq mi)
- Elevation: 154.1 m (506 ft)

Population (2020)
  - Total: 219
  - Density: 189/km^{2} (489/sq mi)

Črešnjice pri Cerkljah (pronounced [ˈtʃɾeːʃnjitsɛ pɾi ˈtseːɾkljax]; in older sources also Češnjice, German: Kerschdorf) is a settlement north of Cerklje ob Krki in the Municipality of Brežice in eastern Slovenia. The area is part of the traditional region of Lower Carniola. It is now included with the rest of the municipality in the Lower Sava Statistical Region.

== Name ==
The name of the settlement was changed from Črešnjice to Črešnjice pri Cerkljah in 1953. In the past the German name was Kerschdorf.
