= Perišče =

- Location in Slovenia
- Coordinates: 45°50′46.87″N 15°39′49.8″E
- Country: Slovenia
- Traditional region: Lower Carniola
- Statistical region: Lower Sava
- Municipality: Brežice

Area
  - Total: 0.35 km^{2} (0.14 sq mi)
- Elevation: 235.1 m (771 ft)

Population (2020)
  - Total: 20
  - Density: 57/km^{2} (150/sq mi)

Perišče (pronounced [pɛˈɾiːʃtʃɛ]) is a small settlement south of Velika Dolina in the Municipality of Brežice in eastern Slovenia, close to the border with Croatia. The area is part of the traditional region of Lower Carniola. It is now included with the rest of the municipality in the Lower Sava Statistical Region.
