= Zasap =

- Location in Slovenia
- Coordinates: 45°53′50.76″N 15°30′45.49″E
- Country: Slovenia
- Traditional region: Lower Carniola
- Statistical region: Lower Sava
- Municipality: Brežice

Area
  - Total: 2.19 km^{2} (0.85 sq mi)
- Elevation: 155.1 m (509 ft)

Population (2020)
  - Total: 47
  - Density: 21/km^{2} (56/sq mi)

Zasap (pronounced [ˈzaːsap]) is a settlement north of Cerklje ob Krki in the Municipality of Brežice in eastern Slovenia. The western part of the runway of the Cerklje ob Krki Air Base lies in the territory of Zasap. The area is part of the traditional region of Lower Carniola. It is now included with the rest of the municipality in the Lower Sava Statistical Region.

At the end of the 19th century, an Iron Age burial ground with about 50 graves was excavated in the area and finds from the graves are kept by the National Museum of Slovenia.
