= Vitna Vas =

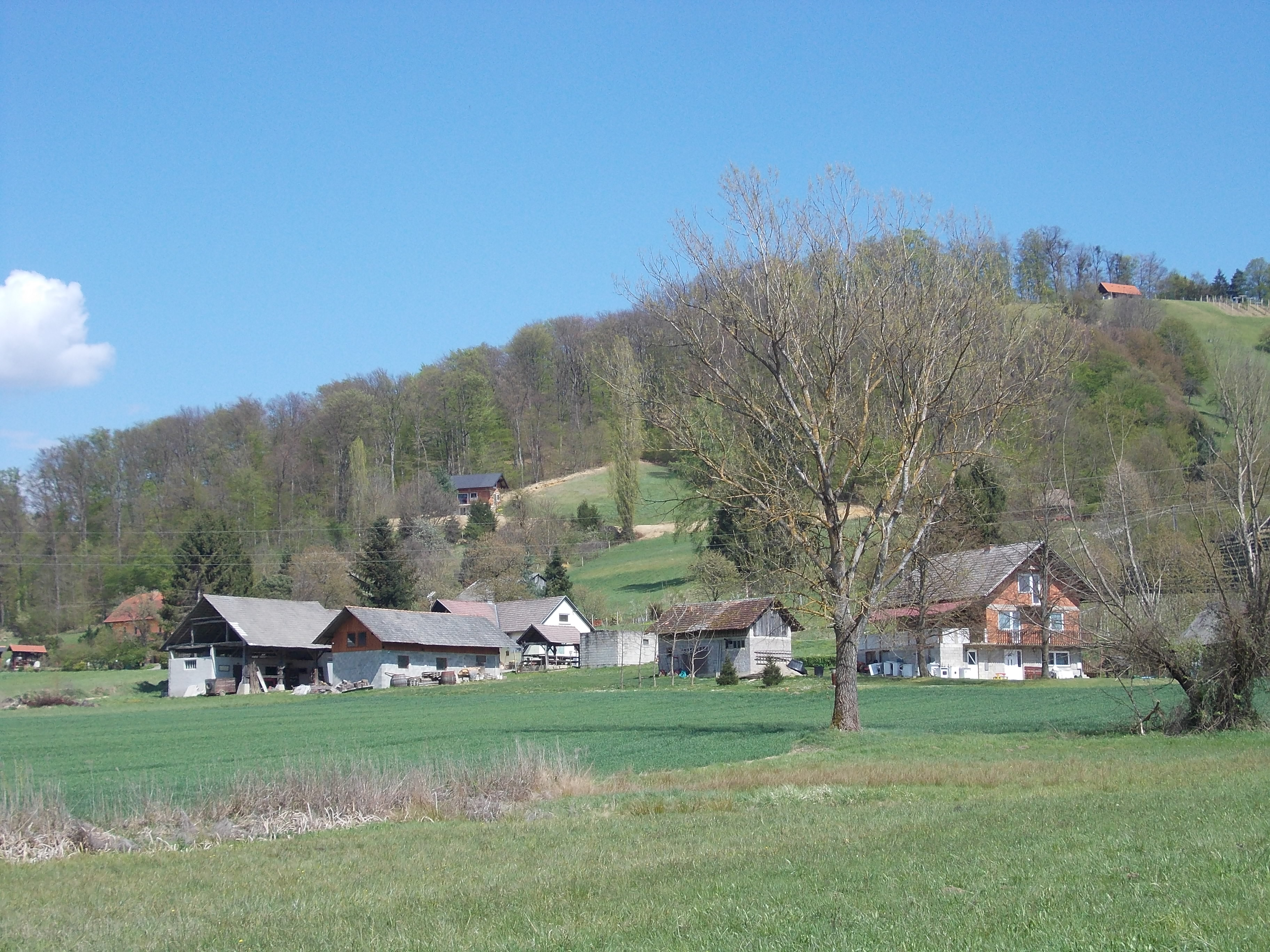

- Location in Slovenia
- Coordinates: 45°59′35.42″N 15°40′6.82″E
- Country: Slovenia
- Traditional region: Styria
- Statistical region: Lower Sava
- Municipality: Brežice

Area
  - Total: 1.61 km^{2} (0.62 sq mi)
- Elevation: 189.7 m (622 ft)

Population (2020)
  - Total: 47
  - Density: 29/km^{2} (76/sq mi)

Vitna Vas (pronounced [ˈʋiːtna ˈʋaːs]; Slovene: Vitna vas, German: Wittmannsdorf) is a settlement in the hills south of Bizeljsko in the Municipality of Brežice in eastern Slovenia. The area is part of the traditional region of Styria. It is now included with the rest of the municipality in the Lower Sava Statistical Region.
