= Spodnja Pohanca =

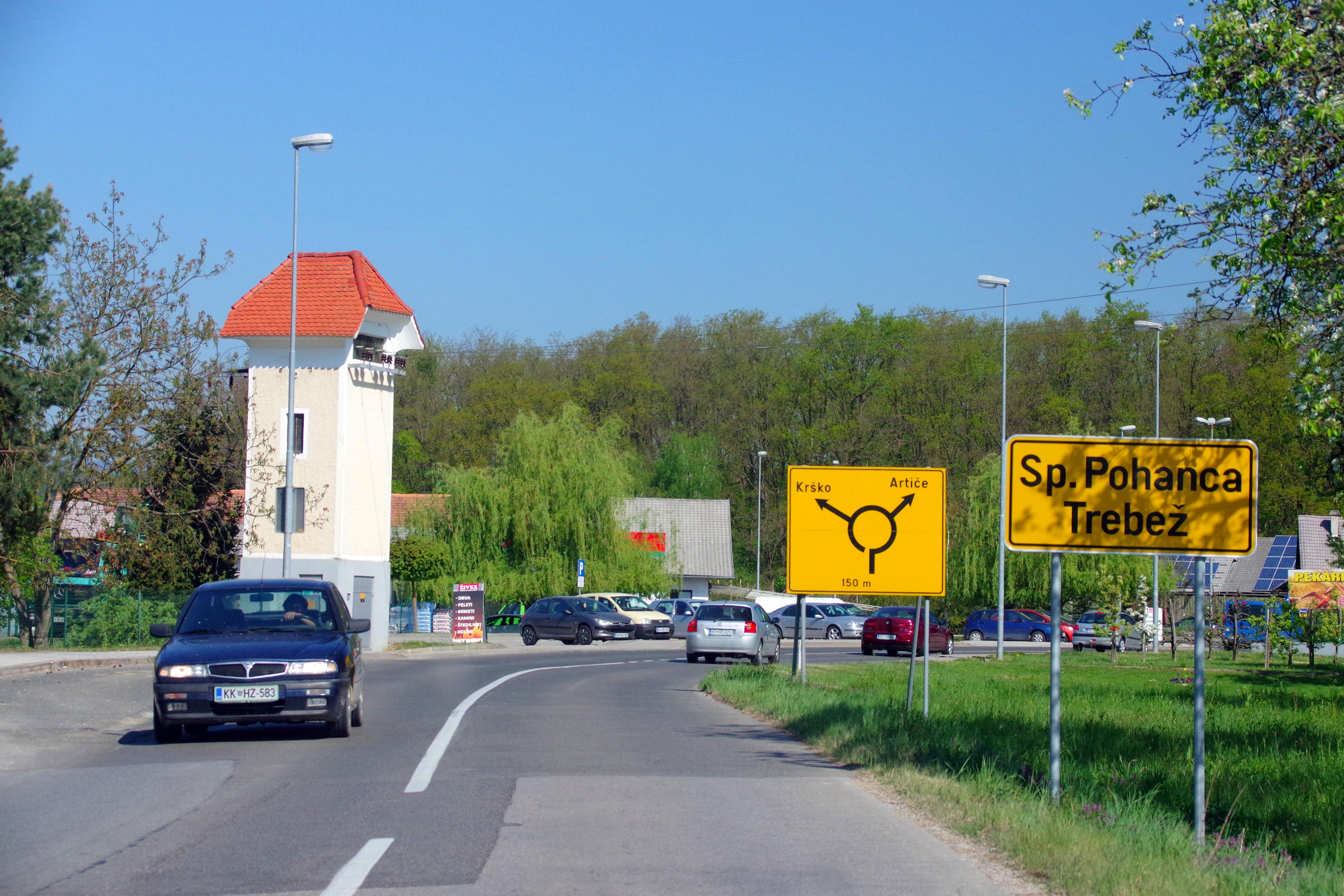
- Road sign in Brežice leading to Spodnja Pohanca

- Location in Slovenia
- Coordinates: 45°56′54.17″N 15°33′54.78″E
- Country: Slovenia
- Traditional region: Styria
- Statistical region: Lower Sava
- Municipality: Brežice

Area
  - Total: 0.57 km^{2} (0.22 sq mi)
- Elevation: 171.5 m (563 ft)

Population (2020)
  - Total: 111
  - Density: 190/km^{2} (500/sq mi)

Spodnja Pohanca (pronounced [ˈspoːdnja ˈpoːxantsa]; German: Unterpochanza) is a village west of Artiče in the Municipality of Brežice in eastern Slovenia. The area is part of the traditional region of Styria. It is now included with the rest of the municipality in the Lower Sava Statistical Region.
