= Drenovec pri Bukovju =

- Location in Slovenia
- Coordinates: 46°1′26.34″N 15°42′23.94″E
- Country: Slovenia
- Traditional region: Styria
- Statistical region: Lower Sava
- Municipality: Brežice

Area
  - Total: 1.9 km^{2} (0.73 sq mi)
- Elevation: 178.8 m (587 ft)

Population (2020)
  - Total: 136
  - Density: 72/km^{2} (190/sq mi)

Drenovec pri Bukovju (pronounced [ˈdɾeːnɔʋəts pɾi ˈbuːkɔu̯ju]; German: Drenovetz) is a settlement in the Municipality of Brežice in eastern Slovenia. It lies in the hills above the right bank of the Sotla River, northeast of Bizeljsko, on the border with Croatia. The area is part of the traditional region of Lower Styria. It is now included with the rest of the municipality in the Lower Sava Statistical Region. The settlement includes the hamlets of Gornji Drenovec, Lipovec (German: Lipovetz), Trnje (German: Ternje), and Gornja Vas (Slovene: Gornja vas, in older sources Zgornja Vas, German: Oberdorf).

== Name ==
The name of the settlement was changed from Drenovec to Drenovec pri Bukovju in 1953. In the past the German name was Drenovetz.
