= Zgornja Pohanca =

- Location in Slovenia
- Coordinates: 45°59′23.7″N 15°34′20.01″E
- Country: Slovenia
- Traditional region: Styria
- Statistical region: Lower Sava
- Municipality: Brežice

Area
  - Total: 3.04 km^{2} (1.17 sq mi)
- Elevation: 376.7 m (1,236 ft)

Population (2020)
  - Total: 93
  - Density: 31/km^{2} (79/sq mi)

Zgornja Pohanca (pronounced [ˈzɡoːɾnja ˈpoːxantsa], German: Oberpochanza) is a settlement in the hills north of Brežice in the Municipality of Brežice in eastern Slovenia. The area is part of the traditional region of Styria. It is now included with the rest of the municipality in the Lower Sava Statistical Region.

There is a small chapel-shrine in the settlement dedicated to the Virgin Mary. It was built in 1898.

== Gallery ==
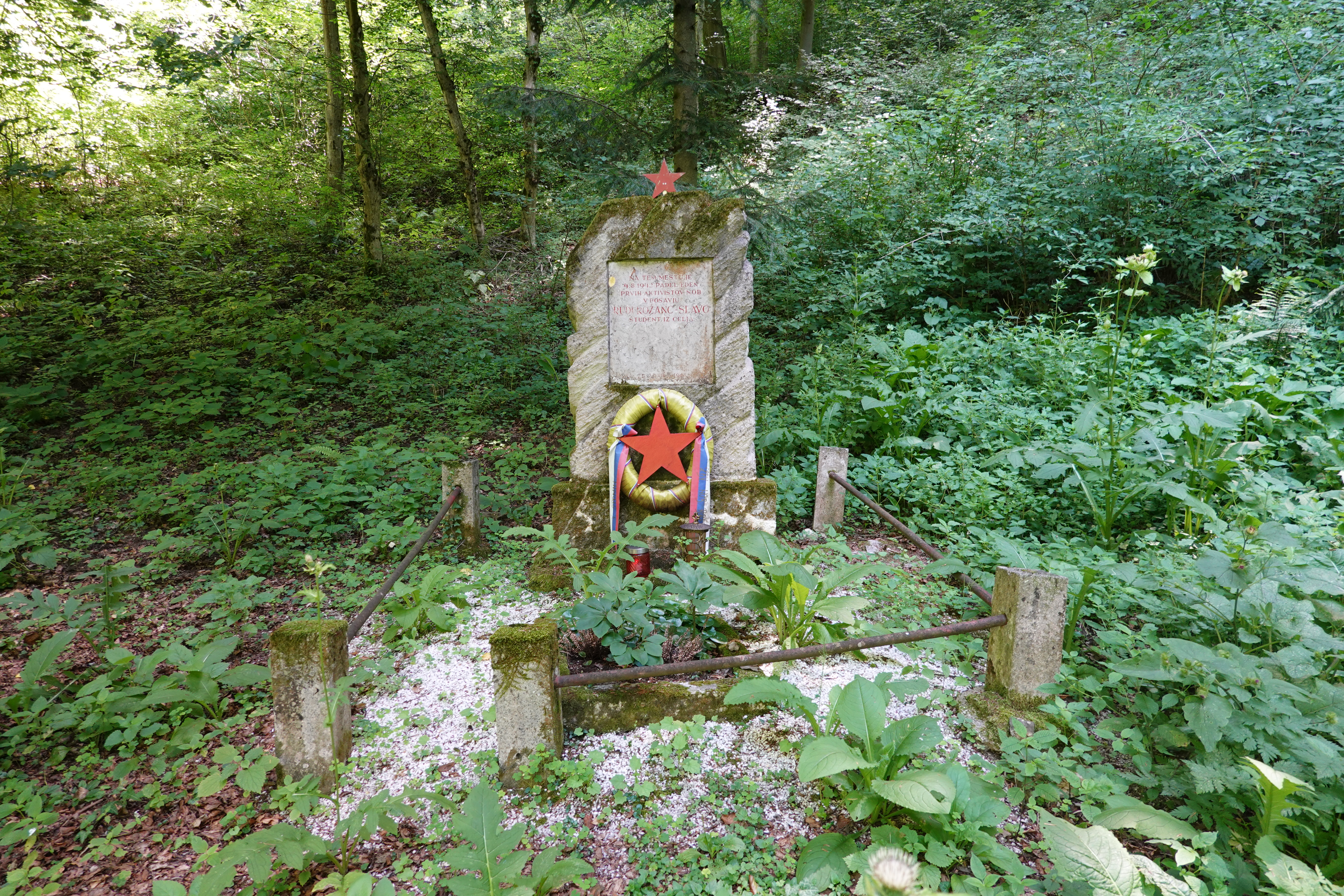
Monument to Rudi Rožanc in Zgornja Pohanca
