= Podgračeno =

- Location in Slovenia
- Coordinates: 45°52′28.56″N 15°38′58.61″E
- Country: Slovenia
- Traditional region: Lower Carniola
- Statistical region: Lower Sava
- Municipality: Brežice

Area
  - Total: 0.47 km^{2} (0.18 sq mi)
- Elevation: 150.1 m (492 ft)

Population (2020)
  - Total: 30
  - Density: 64/km^{2} (170/sq mi)

Podgračeno (pronounced [pɔdɡɾaˈtʃeːnɔ]) is a small settlement on the right bank of the Sava River in the Municipality of Brežice in eastern Slovenia. The area is part of the traditional region of Lower Carniola. It is now included with the rest of the municipality in the Lower Sava Statistical Region.

Numerous remains of Roman buildings have been found in the settlement. The Col area of the settlement has been declared and protected as an archaeological site by the Slovenian Ministry of Culture.
