= Gregovce =

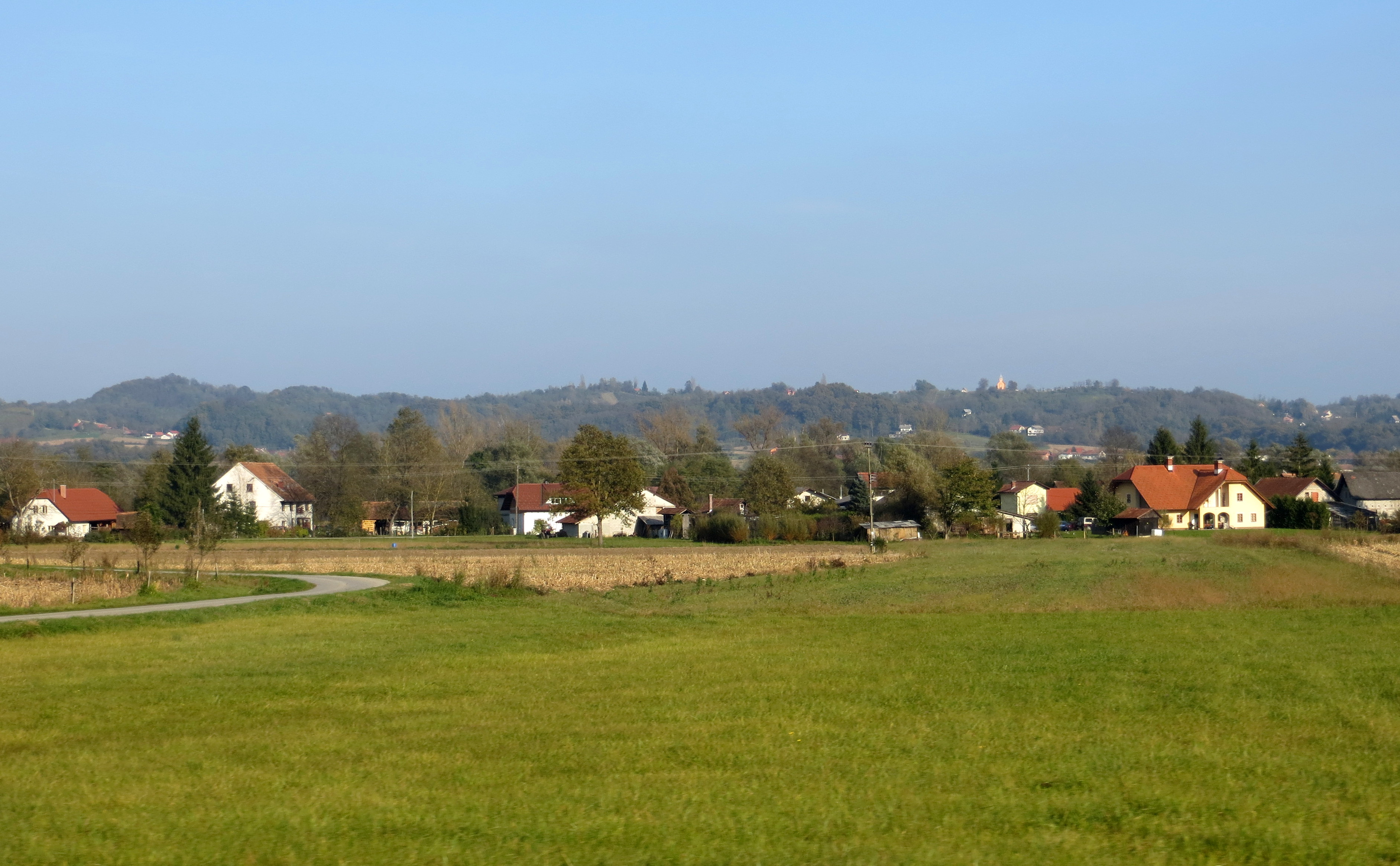

- Location in Slovenia
- Coordinates: 45°59′28.21″N 15°42′7.09″E
- Country: Slovenia
- Traditional region: Styria
- Statistical region: Lower Sava
- Municipality: Brežice

Area
  - Total: 0.42 km^{2} (0.16 sq mi)
- Elevation: 154.8 m (508 ft)

Population (2020)
  - Total: 49
  - Density: 120/km^{2} (300/sq mi)

Gregovce (pronounced [ˈɡɾeːɡɔu̯tsɛ]) is a small village on the right bank of the Sotla River in the Municipality of Brežice in eastern Slovenia, on the border with Croatia. The area is part of the traditional region of Styria. It is now included in the Lower Sava Statistical Region.
