= Slogonsko =

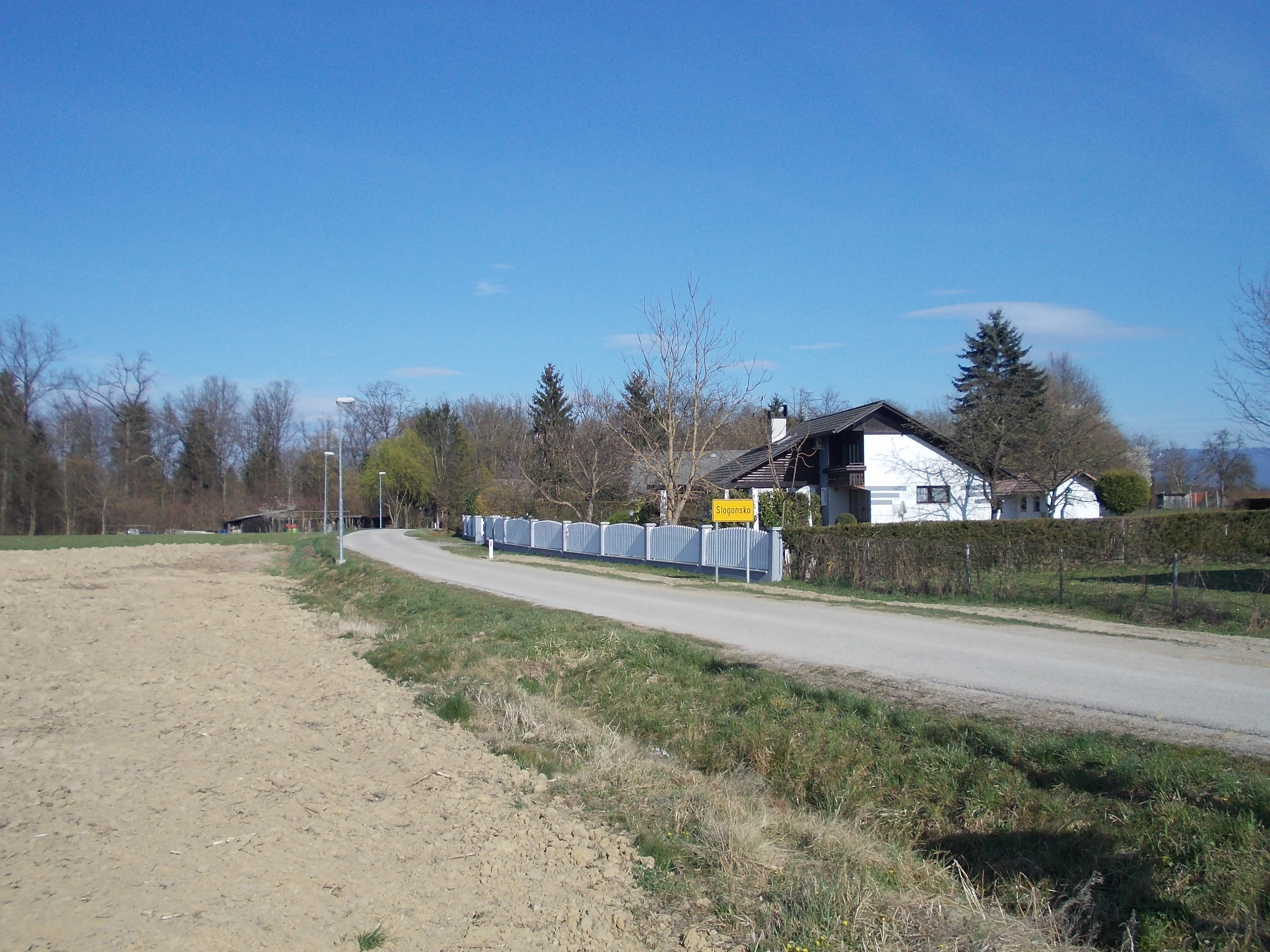

- Location in Slovenia
- Coordinates: 45°56′48.27″N 15°41′55.32″E
- Country: Slovenia
- Traditional region: Styria
- Statistical region: Lower Sava
- Municipality: Brežice

Area
  - Total: 2.74 km^{2} (1.06 sq mi)
- Elevation: 162.7 m (534 ft)

Population (2020)
  - Total: 171
  - Density: 62.4/km^{2} (162/sq mi)

Slogonsko (pronounced [ˈsloːɡɔsnkɔ]; in older sources also Zlogonsko, German: Slogonsko) is a settlement on the right bank of the Sotla River in the Municipality of Brežice in eastern Slovenia, next to the border with Croatia. The area is part of the traditional region of Styria. It is now included in the Lower Sava Statistical Region.
