= Dolenja Pirošica =

- Location in Slovenia
- Coordinates: 45°52′39.92″N 15°31′33.53″E
- Country: Slovenia
- Traditional region: Lower Carniola
- Statistical region: Lower Sava
- Municipality: Brežice

Area
  - Total: 1.2 km^{2} (0.46 sq mi)
- Elevation: 149.9 m (492 ft)

Population (2020)
  - Total: 81
  - Density: 67/km^{2} (170/sq mi)

Dolenja Pirošica (pronounced [dɔˈleːnja ˈpiːɾɔʃitsa]) is a small village on the right bank of the Krka River in the Municipality of Brežice in eastern Slovenia. The area is part of the traditional region of Lower Carniola. It is now included with the rest of the municipality in the Lower Sava Statistical Region.
