= Gorenja Pirošica =

- Location in Slovenia
- Coordinates: 45°52′19.04″N 15°32′5.33″E
- Country: Slovenia
- Traditional region: Lower Carniola
- Statistical region: Lower Sava
- Municipality: Brežice

Area
  - Total: 1.79 km^{2} (0.69 sq mi)
- Elevation: 162.4 m (533 ft)

Population (2020)
  - Total: 119
  - Density: 66.5/km^{2} (172/sq mi)

Gorenja Pirošica (pronounced [ɡɔˈɾeːnja ˈpiːɾɔʃitsa]) is a settlement above the right bank of the Krka River in the Municipality of Brežice in eastern Slovenia. The area is part of the traditional region of Lower Carniola. It is now included in the Lower Sava Statistical Region.
