= Bušeča Vas =

- Location in Slovenia
- Coordinates: 45°52′4.07″N 15°31′10.93″E
- Country: Slovenia
- Traditional region: Lower Carniola
- Statistical region: Lower Sava
- Municipality: Brežice

Area
  - Total: 1.21 km^{2} (0.47 sq mi)
- Elevation: 155.6 m (510 ft)

Population (2020)
  - Total: 138
  - Density: 114/km^{2} (295/sq mi)

Bušeča Vas (pronounced [buˈʃeːtʃa ˈʋaːs]; Slovene: Bušeča vas, German: Puschendorf) is a village on the right bank of the Krka River in the Municipality of Brežice in eastern Slovenia. The area is part of the traditional region of Lower Carniola. It is now included with the rest of the municipality in the Lower Sava Statistical Region.

== Church ==
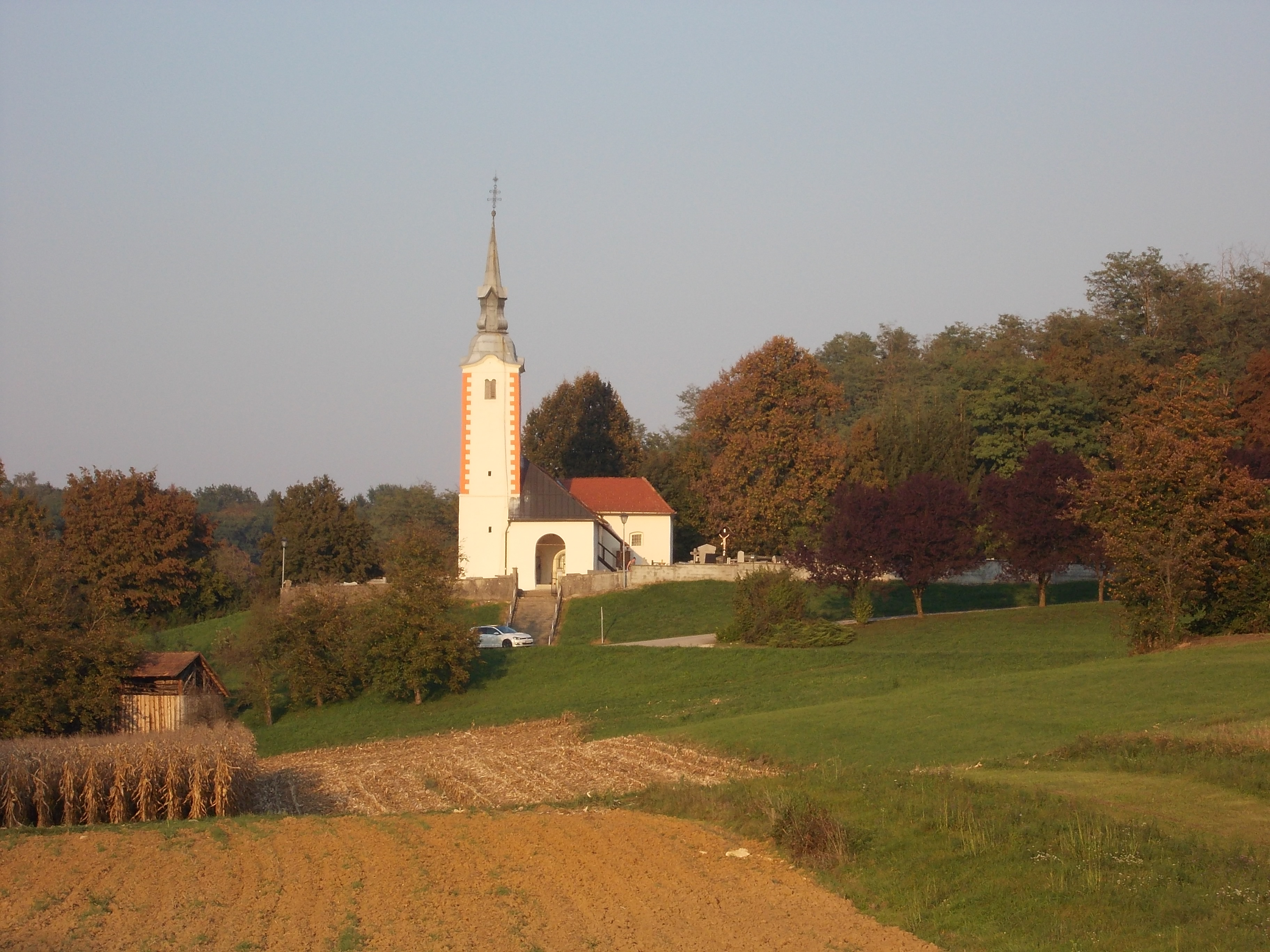
Our Lady of Sorrows Church

The local church is dedicated to Our Lady of Sorrows and belongs to the Parish of Sveti Križ–Podbočje. It is a Gothic church that contains mid-15th-century frescos. The nave was reconstructed and repainted in the 17th century. The belfry dates to 1601.
