= Župelevec =

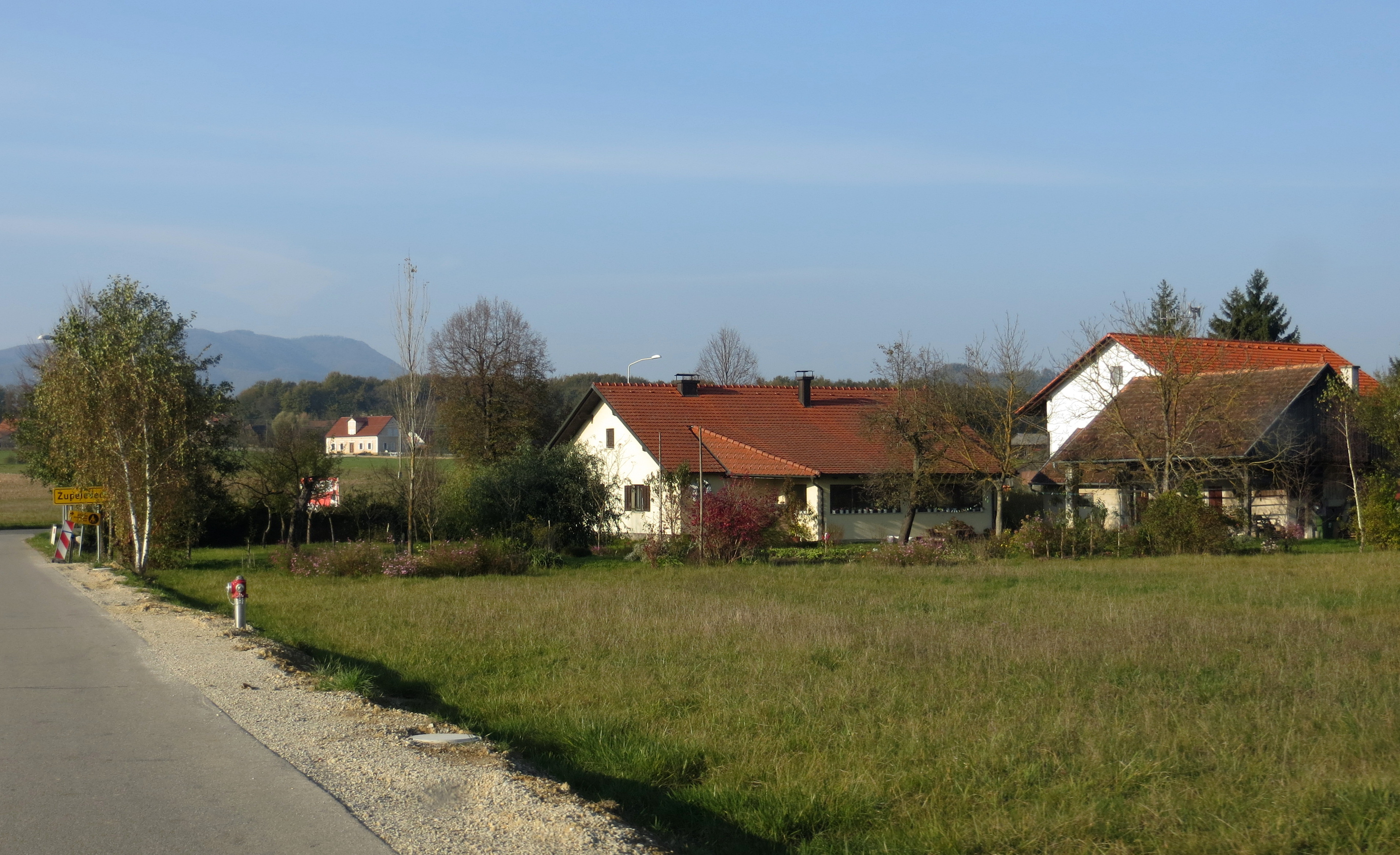

- Location in Slovenia
- Coordinates: 45°57′42.29″N 15°41′13.73″E
- Country: Slovenia
- Traditional region: Styria
- Statistical region: Lower Sava
- Municipality: Brežice

Area
  - Total: 6.06 km^{2} (2.34 sq mi)
- Elevation: 179.9 m (590 ft)

Population (2020)
  - Total: 209
  - Density: 34.5/km^{2} (89.3/sq mi)

Župelevec (pronounced [ʒupɛˈleːʋəts], German: Schupeleutz) is a settlement in the Municipality of Brežice in eastern Slovenia, close to the border with Croatia. The area is part of the traditional region of Styria. It is now included with the rest of the municipality in the Lower Sava Statistical Region.
