= Glogov Brod =

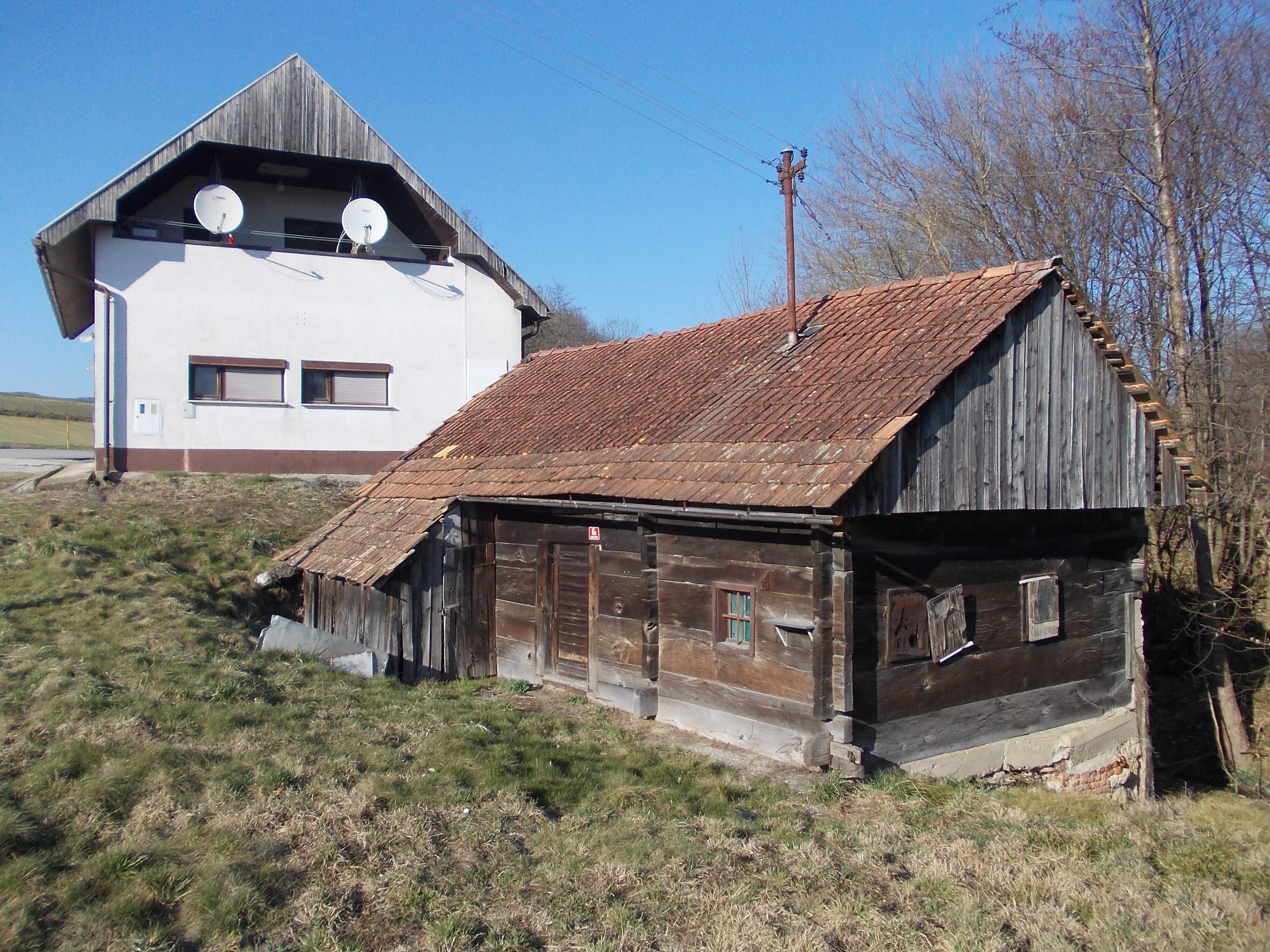

- Location in Slovenia
- Coordinates: 45°56′42.95″N 15°35′39.61″E
- Country: Slovenia
- Traditional region: Styria
- Statistical region: Lower Sava
- Municipality: Brežice

Area
  - Total: 1.05 km^{2} (0.41 sq mi)
- Elevation: 160.6 m (527 ft)

Population (2020)
  - Total: 123
  - Density: 117/km^{2} (303/sq mi)

Glogov Brod (pronounced [ˈɡloːɡɔu̯ ˈbɾoːt]) is a village south of Artiče in the Municipality of Brežice in eastern Slovenia. The area is part of the traditional region of Styria. It is now included in the Lower Sava Statistical Region.
