= Oklukova Gora =

- Location in Slovenia
- Coordinates: 45°58′25.14″N 15°34′5.93″E
- Country: Slovenia
- Traditional region: Styria
- Statistical region: Lower Sava
- Municipality: Brežice

Area
  - Total: 1.24 km^{2} (0.48 sq mi)
- Elevation: 279 m (915 ft)

Population (2020)
  - Total: 66
  - Density: 53/km^{2} (140/sq mi)

Oklukova Gora (pronounced [ɔˈkluːkɔʋa ˈɡɔːɾa], German: Oklukovagora) is a settlement in the Municipality of Brežice in eastern Slovenia. The area is part of the traditional region of Styria. It is now included with the rest of the municipality in the Lower Sava Statistical Region.
