= Sobenja Vas =

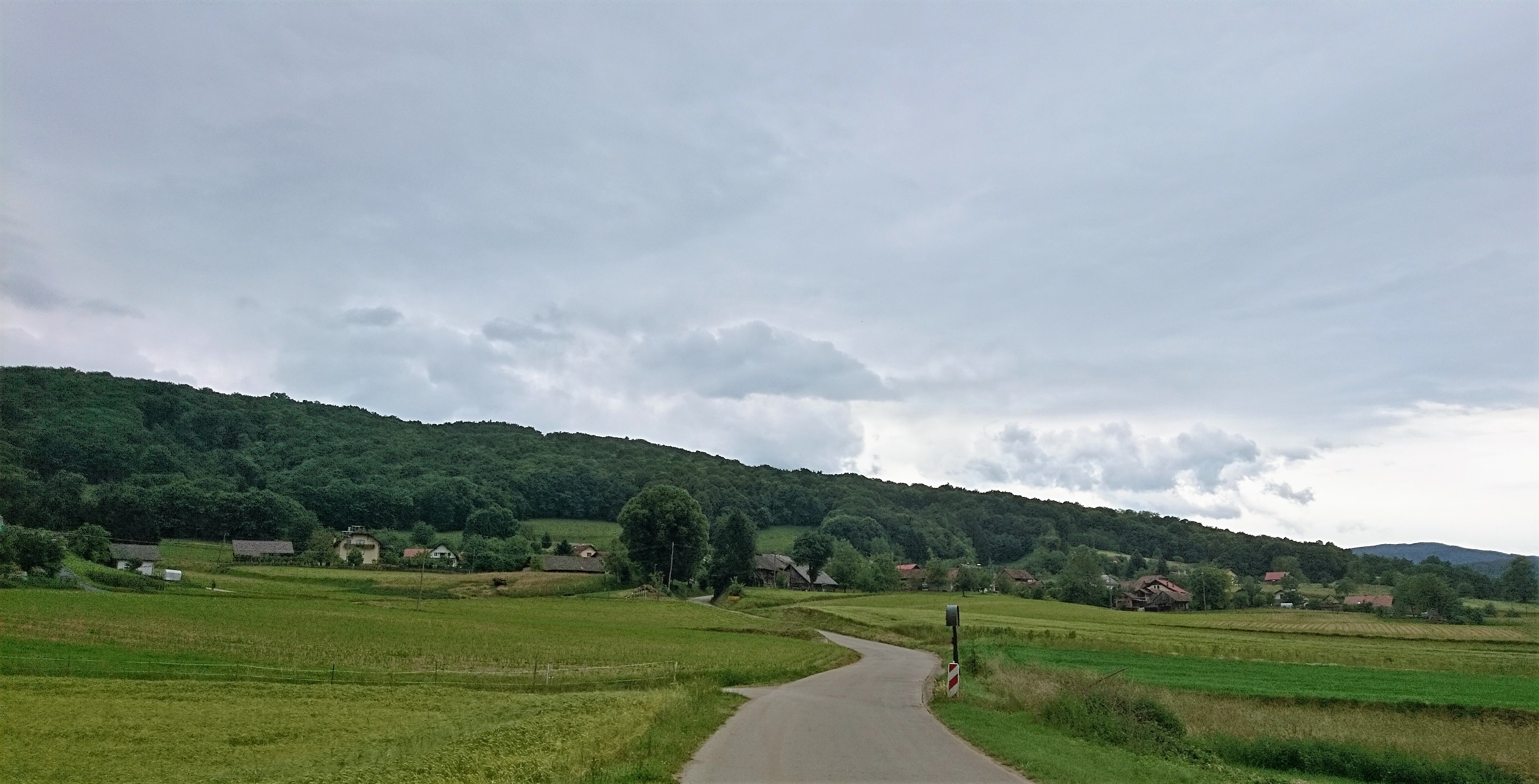

- Location in Slovenia
- Coordinates: 45°51′58.04″N 15°35′11.98″E
- Country: Slovenia
- Traditional region: Lower Carniola
- Statistical region: Lower Sava
- Municipality: Brežice

Area
  - Total: 1.4 km^{2} (0.54 sq mi)
- Elevation: 253.2 m (831 ft)

Population (2020)
  - Total: 138
  - Density: 99/km^{2} (260/sq mi)

Sobenja Vas (pronounced [sɔˈbeːnja ˈʋaːs]; Slovene: Sobenja vas) is a small village in the eastern foothills of the Gorjanci Mountains in the Municipality of Brežice in eastern Slovenia, close to the border with Croatia. The area is part of the traditional region of Lower Carniola. It is now included with the rest of the municipality in the Lower Sava Statistical Region.

A simple chapel-shrine with a small belfry in the settlement is dedicated to Our Lady of Sorrows and was built in the first quarter of the 20th century.
