= Vrhovska Vas =

- Location in Slovenia
- Coordinates: 45°51′34.68″N 15°30′52.11″E
- Country: Slovenia
- Traditional region: Lower Carniola
- Statistical region: Lower Sava
- Municipality: Brežice

Area
  - Total: 1.4 km^{2} (0.54 sq mi)
- Elevation: 252.3 m (828 ft)

Population (2020)
  - Total: 65
  - Density: 46/km^{2} (120/sq mi)

Vrhovska Vas (pronounced [ʋəɾˈxoːu̯ska ˈʋaːs]; Slovene: Vrhovska vas) is a settlement in the hills above the right bank of the Krka River in the Municipality of Brežice in eastern Slovenia. The area is part of the traditional region of Lower Carniola. It is now included with the rest of the municipality in the Lower Sava Statistical Region.
