= Kraška Vas =

- Location in Slovenia
- Coordinates: 45°51′50.45″N 15°33′30.36″E
- Country: Slovenia
- Traditional region: Lower Carniola
- Statistical region: Lower Sava
- Municipality: Brežice

Area
  - Total: 0.96 km^{2} (0.37 sq mi)
- Elevation: 230.7 m (757 ft)

Population (2020)
  - Total: 23
  - Density: 24/km^{2} (62/sq mi)

Kraška Vas (pronounced [ˈkɾaːʃka ˈʋaːs]; Slovene: Kraška vas) is a small village in the eastern Gorjanci Mountains in the Municipality of Brežice in eastern Slovenia. The area is part of the traditional region of Lower Carniola. It is now included in the Lower Sava Statistical Region.
