= Silovec =

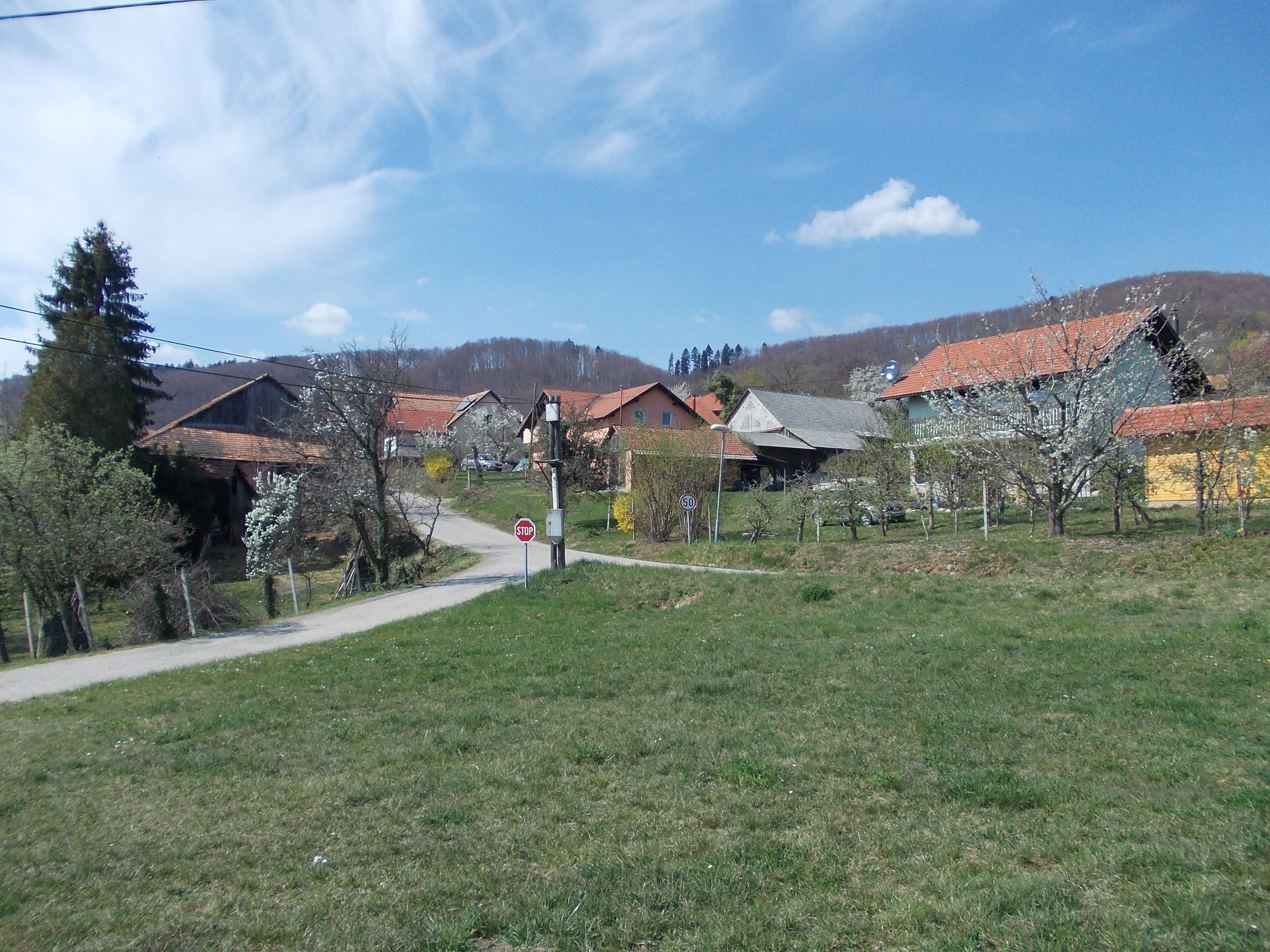

- Location in Slovenia
- Coordinates: 45°59′44.24″N 15°36′0.61″E
- Country: Slovenia
- Traditional region: Styria
- Statistical region: Lower Sava
- Municipality: Brežice

Area
  - Total: 1.29 km^{2} (0.50 sq mi)
- Elevation: 377.6 m (1,239 ft)

Population (2020)
  - Total: 31
  - Density: 24/km^{2} (62/sq mi)

Silovec (pronounced [ˈsiːlɔʋəts], German: Silovetz) is a settlement in the hills north of Brežice in eastern Slovenia. The area is part of the traditional region of Styria. It is now included in the Lower Sava Statistical Region.

A Late Bronze Age hoard was discovered by chance in Heathen Cave (Slovene: Ajdovska jama) close to the settlement. It included bracelets, necklaces, sickles, and axes, all now kept by the museum in Brežice.
