= Dolenje Skopice =

- Location in Slovenia
- Coordinates: 45°54′10.46″N 15°33′15.53″E
- Country: Slovenia
- Traditional region: Lower Carniola
- Statistical region: Lower Sava
- Municipality: Brežice

Area
  - Total: 2.05 km^{2} (0.79 sq mi)
- Elevation: 150.4 m (493 ft)

Population (2020)
  - Total: 196
  - Density: 95.6/km^{2} (248/sq mi)

Dolenje Skopice (pronounced [dɔˈleːnjɛ skɔˈpiːtsɛ]; German: Unterskopiz) is a village on the right bank of the Sava River in the Municipality of Brežice in eastern Slovenia. The area is part of the traditional region of Lower Carniola. It is now included with the rest of the municipality in the Lower Sava Statistical Region.

Numerous finds in the ploughed fields around the village, mostly of dressed stone, imbrices, and tegulae, show that the area was settled in Roman times.
