= Curnovec, Brežice =

Curnovec
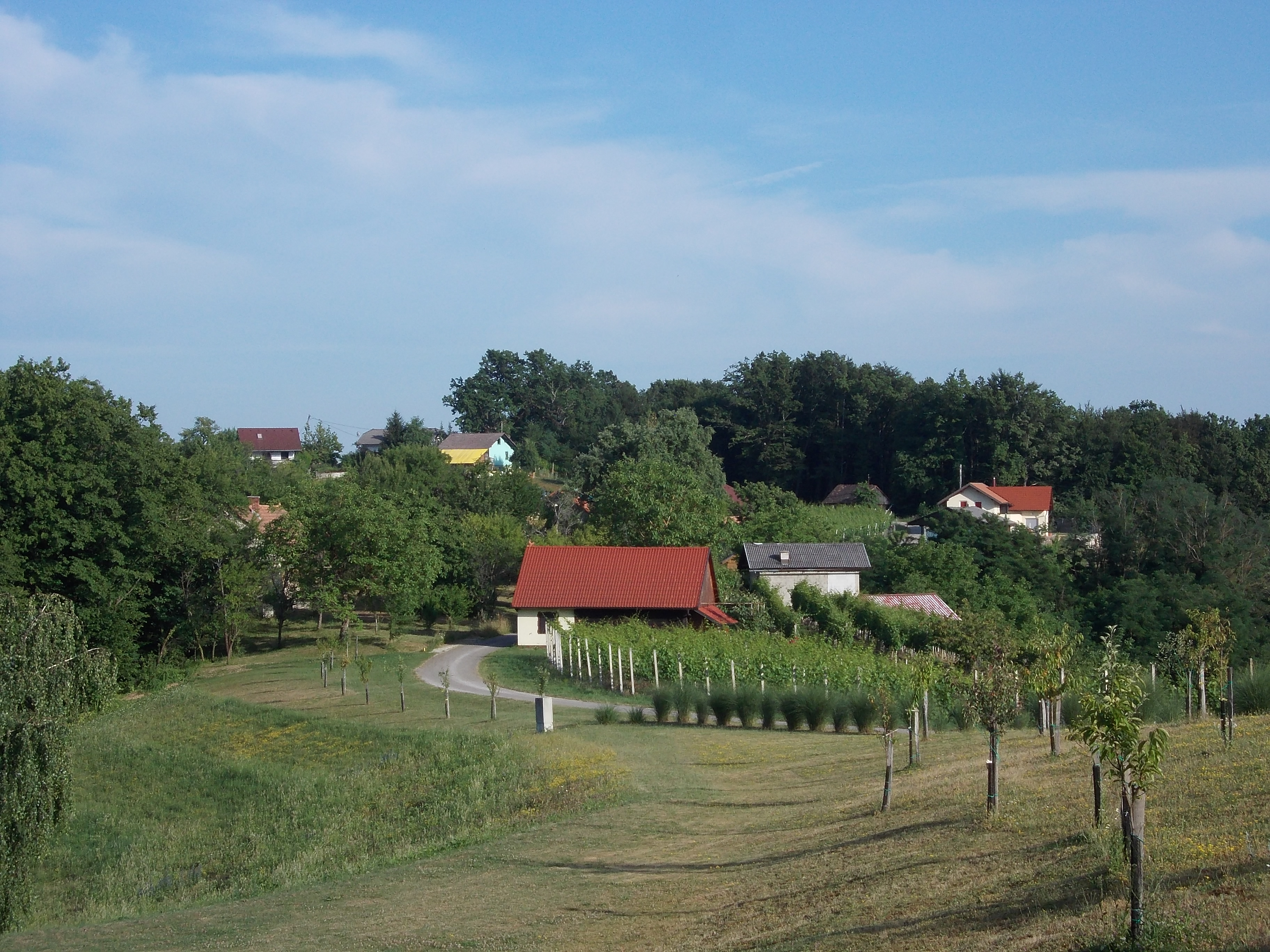

- Location in Slovenia
- Coordinates: 45°58′3.79″N 15°36′6.02″E
- Country: Slovenia
- Traditional region: Styria
- Statistical region: Lower Sava
- Municipality: Brežice

Area
  - Total: 3.36 km^{2} (1.30 sq mi)
- Elevation: 198.1 m (650 ft)

Population (2020)
  - Total: 144
  - Density: 42.9/km^{2} (111/sq mi)

Curnovec (pronounced [ˈtsuːɾnɔʋəts], German: Zurnovetz) is a settlement in the Municipality of Brežice in eastern Slovenia. The area is part of the traditional region of Styria. It is now included in the Lower Sava Statistical Region.
