= Nova Vas ob Sotli =

- Location in Slovenia
- Coordinates: 46°0′16.15″N 15°42′7.7″E
- Country: Slovenia
- Traditional region: Styria
- Statistical region: Lower Sava
- Municipality: Brežice

Area
  - Total: 1.3 km^{2} (0.50 sq mi)
- Elevation: 157.3 m (516 ft)

Population (2020)
  - Total: 64
  - Density: 49/km^{2} (130/sq mi)

Nova Vas ob Sotli (pronounced [ˈnoːʋa ˈʋaːs ɔp ˈsoːtli]; Slovene: Nova vas ob Sotli, German: Neudorf) is a small village on the right bank of the Sotla River southeast of Bizeljsko in the Municipality of Brežice in eastern Slovenia. The area is part of the traditional region of Styria. It is now included in the Lower Sava Statistical Region.
