= Globočice, Brežice =

Globočice
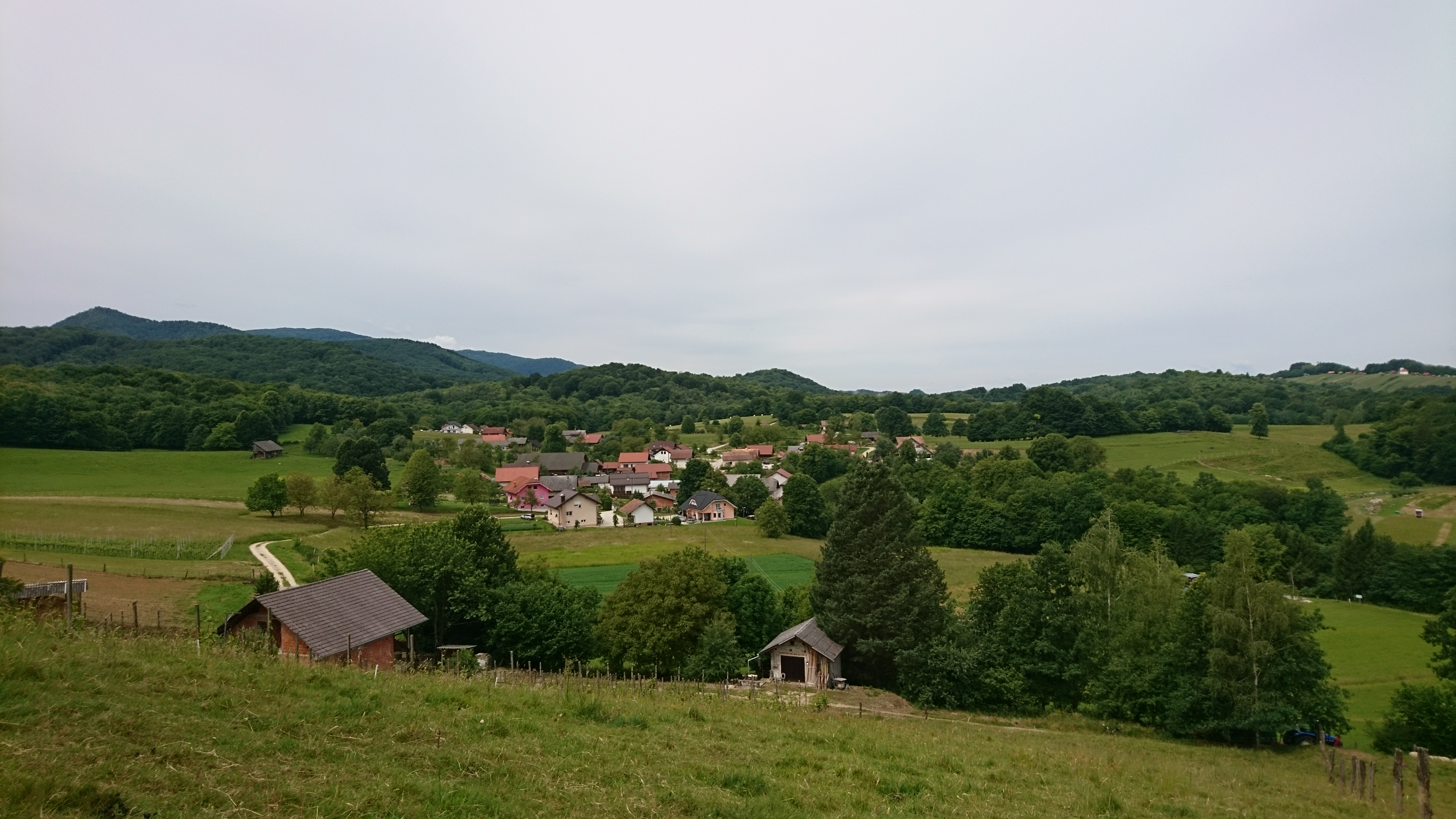

- Location in Slovenia
- Coordinates: 45°51′45.97″N 15°34′25.95″E
- Country: Slovenia
- Traditional region: Lower Carniola
- Statistical region: Lower Sava
- Municipality: Brežice

Area
  - Total: 2.61 km^{2} (1.01 sq mi)
- Elevation: 227.5 m (746 ft)

Population (2020)
  - Total: 81
  - Density: 31/km^{2} (80/sq mi)

Globočice (pronounced [ɡlɔbɔˈtʃiːtsɛ]; in older sources also Globočica, German: Globotschitz) is a village in the Municipality of Brežice in eastern Slovenia, next to the border with Croatia. The area is part of the traditional region of Lower Carniola. It is now included with the rest of the municipality in the Lower Sava Statistical Region.
