= Sela pri Dobovi =

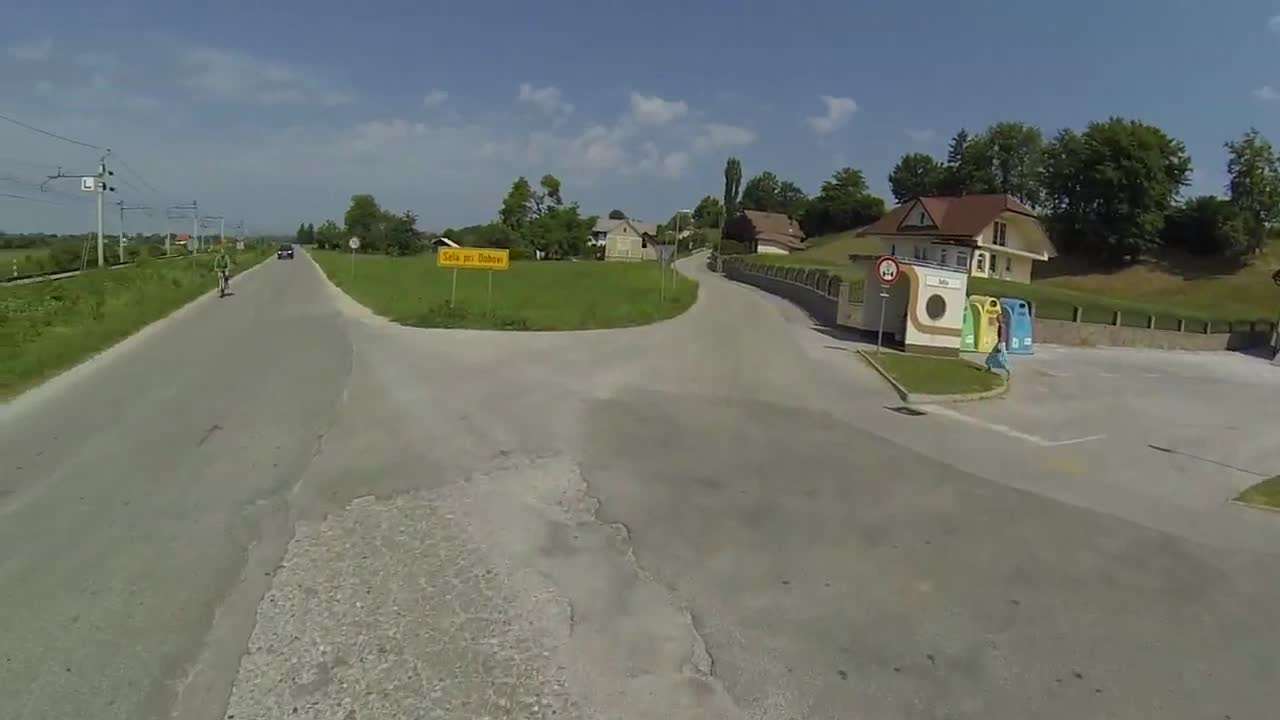

- Location in Slovenia
- Coordinates: 45°54′50″N 15°37′56″E
- Country: Slovenia
- Traditional region: Styria
- Statistical region: Lower Sava
- Municipality: Brežice

Area
  - Total: 7.32 km^{2} (2.83 sq mi)
- Elevation: 156.5 m (513 ft)

Population (2020)
  - Total: 549
  - Density: 75.0/km^{2} (194/sq mi)

Sela pri Dobovi (pronounced [ˈseːla pɾi ˈdoːbɔʋi]) is a settlement northwest of Dobova in the Municipality of Brežice in eastern Slovenia. The area is part of the traditional region of Styria. It is now included with the rest of the municipality in the Lower Sava Statistical Region.

== Name ==
The name of the settlement was changed from Sela to Sela pri Dobovi in 1953.
