= Bukošek =

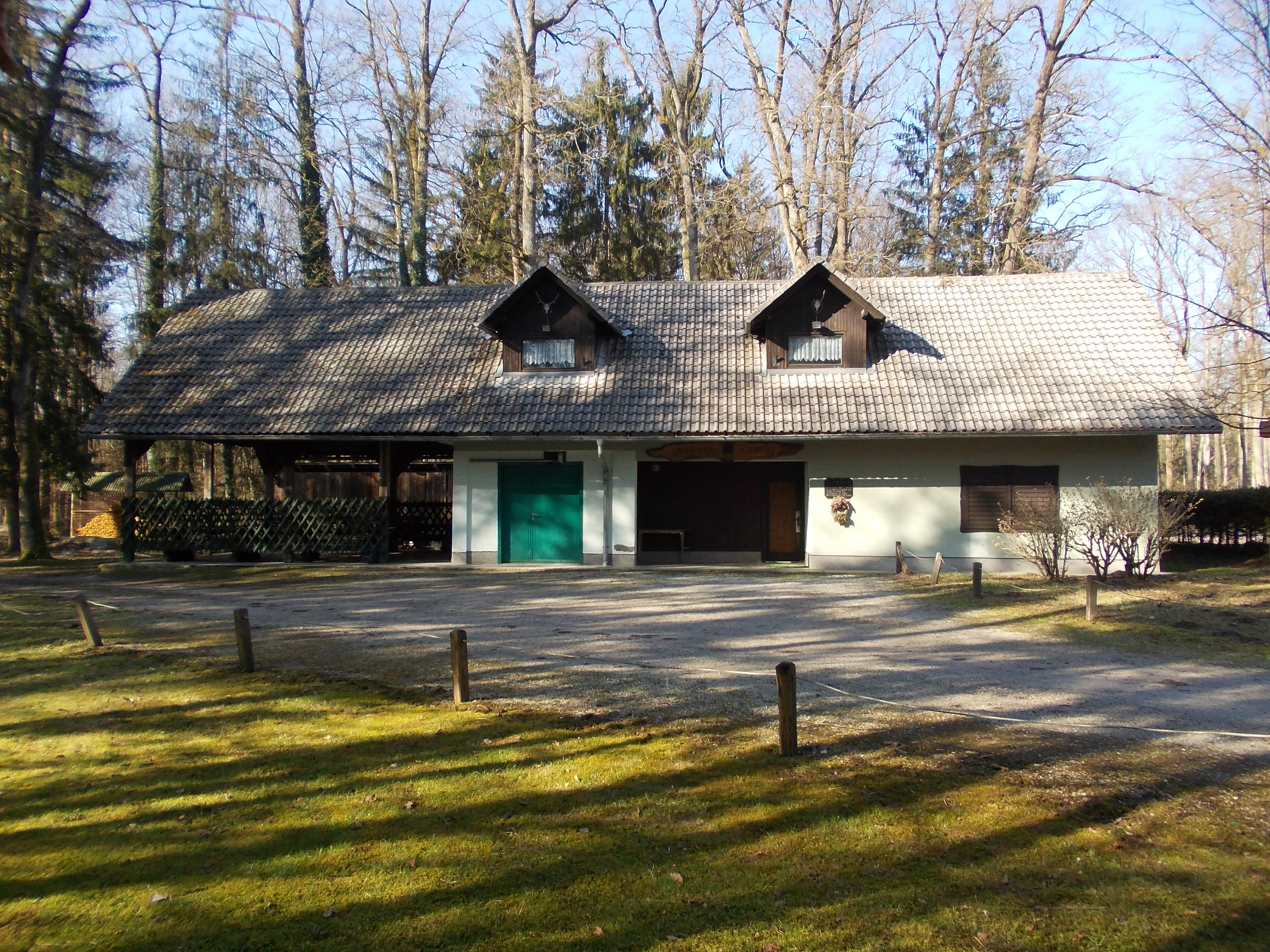
- Brežice Hunting Club Lodge in Bukošek

- Location in Slovenia
- Coordinates: 45°55′31.71″N 15°37′37.2″E
- Country: Slovenia
- Traditional region: Styria
- Statistical region: Lower Sava
- Municipality: Brežice

Area
  - Total: 5.87 km^{2} (2.27 sq mi)
- Elevation: 155.9 m (511 ft)

Population (2020)
  - Total: 295
  - Density: 50.3/km^{2} (130/sq mi)

Bukošek (pronounced [ˈbuːkɔʃək], German: Bukoschek) is a settlement northeast of Brežice in the Municipality of Brežice in eastern Slovenia. The area is part of the traditional region of Styria. It is now included with the rest of the municipality in the Lower Sava Statistical Region.
