= Jereslavec =

- Location in Slovenia
- Coordinates: 45°55′53.3″N 15°41′39.77″E
- Country: Slovenia
- Traditional region: Styria
- Statistical region: Lower Sava
- Municipality: Brežice

Area
  - Total: 3.81 km^{2} (1.47 sq mi)
- Elevation: 161.1 m (529 ft)

Population (2020)
  - Total: 147
  - Density: 38.6/km^{2} (99.9/sq mi)

Jereslavec (pronounced [jɛɾɛˈslaːʋəts]; in older sources also Jereslavc, German: Jereslauz) is a settlement on the right bank of the Sotla River in the Municipality of Brežice in eastern Slovenia, close to the border with Croatia. The area is part of the traditional region of Styria. It is now included in the Lower Sava Statistical Region. The Jovsi wetland lies south of the village.
