= Cirnik, Brežice =

Cirnik
- Location in Slovenia
- Coordinates: 45°51′52.03″N 15°38′44.27″E
- Country: Slovenia
- Traditional region: Lower Carniola
- Statistical region: Lower Sava
- Municipality: Brežice

Area
  - Total: 3.87 km^{2} (1.49 sq mi)
- Elevation: 353.5 m (1,160 ft)

Population (2020)
  - Total: 123
  - Density: 31.8/km^{2} (82.3/sq mi)

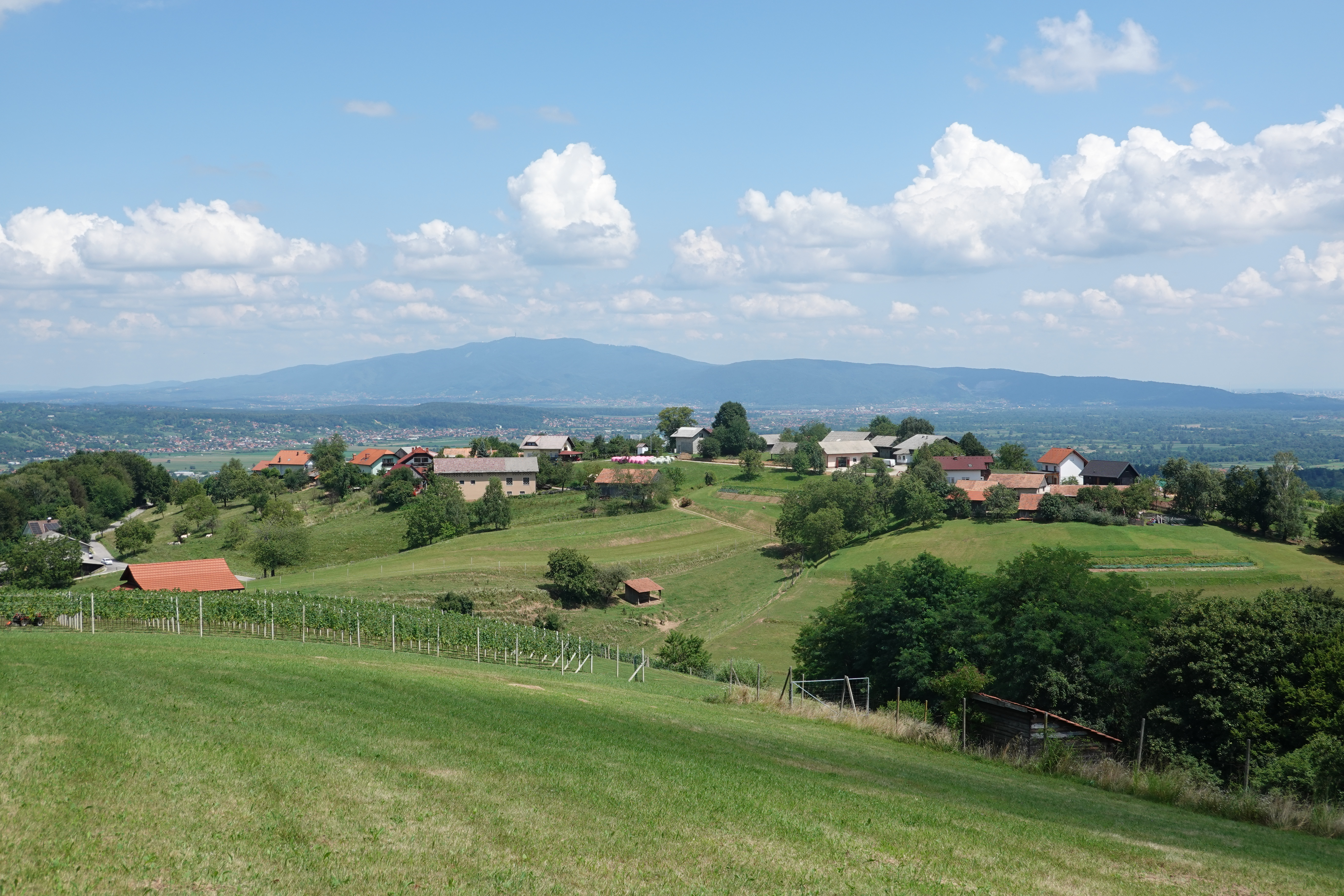
Cirnik, Brežice

Cirnik (pronounced [ˈtsiːɾnik], in older sources also Veliki Cirnik, German: Großzirnik) is a settlement in the hills above the right bank of the Sava River in the Municipality of Brežice in eastern Slovenia. The area is part of the traditional region of Lower Carniola. It is now included in the Lower Sava Statistical Region.

The local church is dedicated to the Holy Cross and belongs to the Parish of Velika Dolina. It dates to 1645.
