= Brvi =

- Location in Slovenia
- Coordinates: 45°52′3.76″N 15°32′31.05″E
- Country: Slovenia
- Traditional region: Lower Carniola
- Statistical region: Lower Sava
- Municipality: Brežice

Area
  - Total: 0.38 km^{2} (0.15 sq mi)
- Elevation: 176.2 m (578 ft)

Population (2020)
  - Total: 45
  - Density: 120/km^{2} (310/sq mi)

Brvi (pronounced [bəɾˈʋiː]) is a settlement to the south of Bizeljsko in the Municipality of Brežice in eastern Slovenia. The area is part of the traditional region of Lower Carniola. It is now included with the rest of the municipality in the Lower Sava Statistical Region.

The foundations of a Roman building have been found in the area. A Roman aqueduct supplying water to the nearby settlement of Neviodunum ran through the area and older sources also state the discovery of Roman burials in the vicinity.
