= Pavlova Vas =

- Location in Slovenia
- Coordinates: 46°0′20.04″N 15°37′29.31″E
- Country: Slovenia
- Traditional region: Styria
- Statistical region: Lower Sava
- Municipality: Brežice

Area
  - Total: 6.61 km^{2} (2.55 sq mi)
- Elevation: 450.2 m (1,477 ft)

Population (2020)
  - Total: 214
  - Density: 32.4/km^{2} (83.9/sq mi)

Pavlova Vas (pronounced [ˈpaːu̯lɔʋa ˈʋaːs]; Slovene: Pavlova vas, German: Paulusberg) is a settlement in the hills west of Bizeljsko in the Municipality of Brežice in eastern Slovenia. The area is part of the traditional region of Styria. It is now included with the rest of the municipality in the Lower Sava Statistical Region. It includes the hamlets of Goliše, Grič, Sveti Jedrt (German: Sankt Gertraud), Jesenovec, Lipovec, Ravne, Rigelj (German: Riegl), Trate, and Trobovnik.

The local church in the settlement is dedicated to Saint Gertrude and belongs to the Parish of Pišece. It is a late-16th-century building that was refurbished in the Baroque style in the 18th century. Its belfry was rebuilt in the 19th century.
