= Dečno Selo =

- Location in Slovenia
- Coordinates: 45°57′9.3″N 15°36′20.29″E
- Country: Slovenia
- Traditional region: Styria
- Statistical region: Lower Sava
- Municipality: Brežice

Area
  - Total: 4.35 km^{2} (1.68 sq mi)
- Elevation: 173.1 m (568 ft)

Population (2020)
  - Total: 288
  - Density: 66.2/km^{2} (171/sq mi)

Dečno Selo (pronounced [ˈdeːtʃnɔ ˈsɛːlɔ]; Slovene: Dečno selo, in older sources also Dečna Sela, German: Detschnasela) is a settlement in the Municipality of Brežice in eastern Slovenia. The area is part of the traditional region of Styria. It is now included with the rest of the municipality in the Lower Sava Statistical Region.

A small chapel-shrine in the centre of the village was built in the early 20th century.
