= Arnovo Selo =

- Location in Slovenia
- Coordinates: 45°57′49.53″N 15°34′0.92″E
- Country: Slovenia
- Traditional region: Styria
- Statistical region: Lower Sava
- Municipality: Brežice

Area
  - Total: 2.9 km^{2} (1.1 sq mi)
- Elevation: 217.9 m (715 ft)

Population (2020)
  - Total: 284
  - Density: 98/km^{2} (250/sq mi)

Arnovo Selo (pronounced [ˈaːɾnɔʋɔ ˈsɛːlɔ]; Slovene: Arnovo selo, in older sources also Arnova Sela, German: Arnovasela) is a settlement in the Municipality of Brežice in eastern Slovenia. It lies in the hills north of the town of Brežice. The area is part of the traditional region of Styria. It is now included in the Lower Sava Statistical Region.
