= Stojanski Vrh =

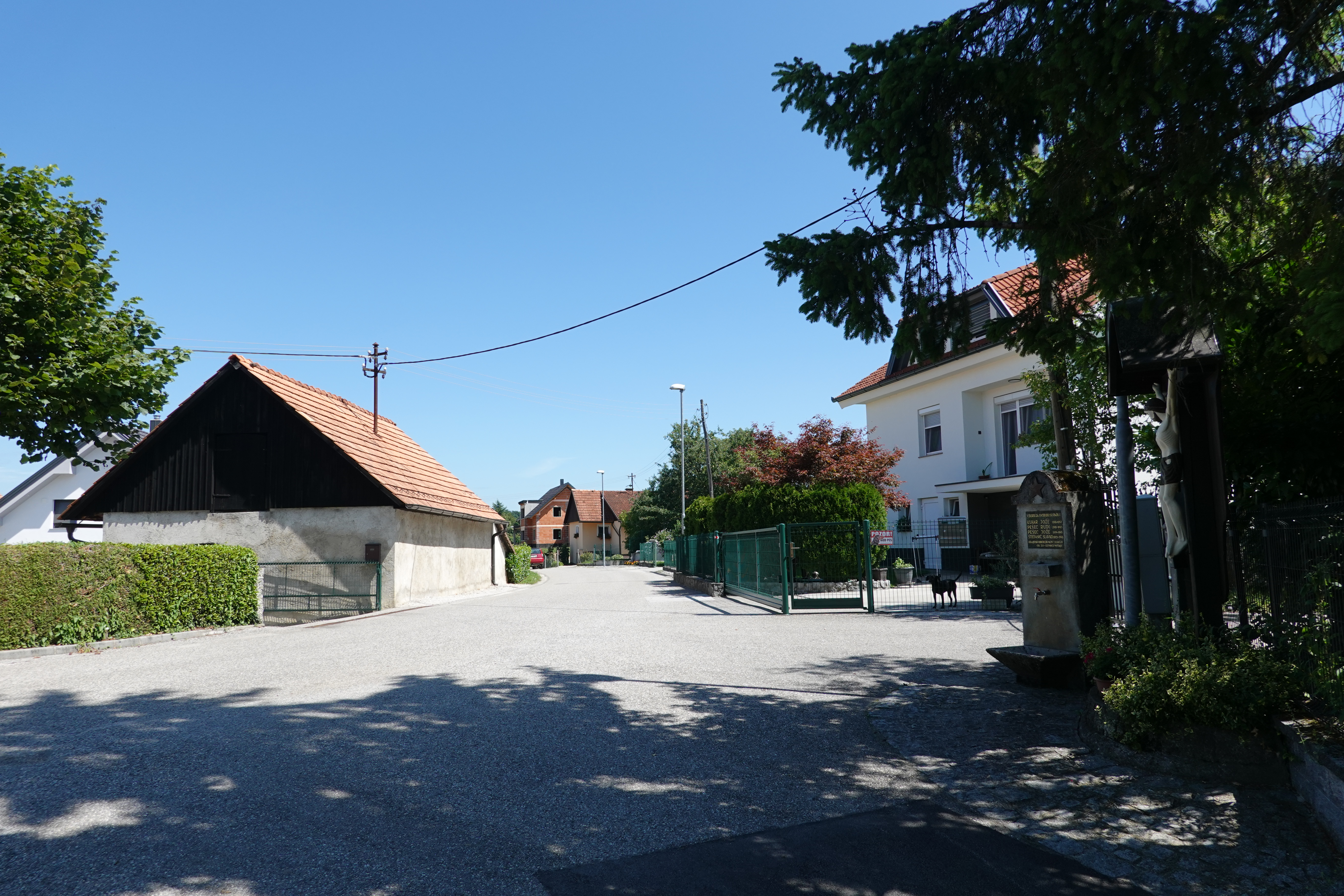

- Location in Slovenia
- Coordinates: 45°51′43.34″N 15°32′20.75″E
- Country: Slovenia
- Traditional region: Lower Carniola
- Statistical region: Lower Sava
- Municipality: Brežice

Area
  - Total: 2.26 km^{2} (0.87 sq mi)
- Elevation: 230.3 m (756 ft)

Population (2020)
  - Total: 61
  - Density: 27/km^{2} (70/sq mi)

Stojanski Vrh (pronounced [stɔˈjaːnski ˈʋəɾx]; German: Stojanski Werch) is a village in the Municipality of Brežice, eastern Slovenia, close to the border with Croatia. The area is part of the traditional region of Lower Carniola. It is now included with the rest of the municipality in the Lower Sava Statistical Region.
