= Gorenje Skopice =

- Location in Slovenia
- Coordinates: 45°54′21.6″N 15°32′50.12″E
- Country: Slovenia
- Traditional region: Lower Carniola
- Statistical region: Lower Sava
- Municipality: Brežice

Area
  - Total: 4.98 km^{2} (1.92 sq mi)
- Elevation: 150.7 m (494 ft)

Population (2020)
  - Total: 180
  - Density: 36/km^{2} (94/sq mi)

Gorenje Skopice (pronounced [ɡɔˈɾeːnjɛ skɔˈpiːtsɛ]; German: Oberskopiz) is a settlement on the right bank of the Sava River in the Municipality of Brežice in eastern Slovenia. The area is part of the traditional region of Lower Carniola. It is now included in the Lower Sava Statistical Region.

In the hamlet of Pečina in the settlement, remains of a small Roman Villa rustica on the Roman road from Emona to Siscia with a 1st-century burial ground have been found. Archaeological evidence shows that the site was also occupied in the 4th and 5th centuries.
