= Globoko, Brežice =

Globoko
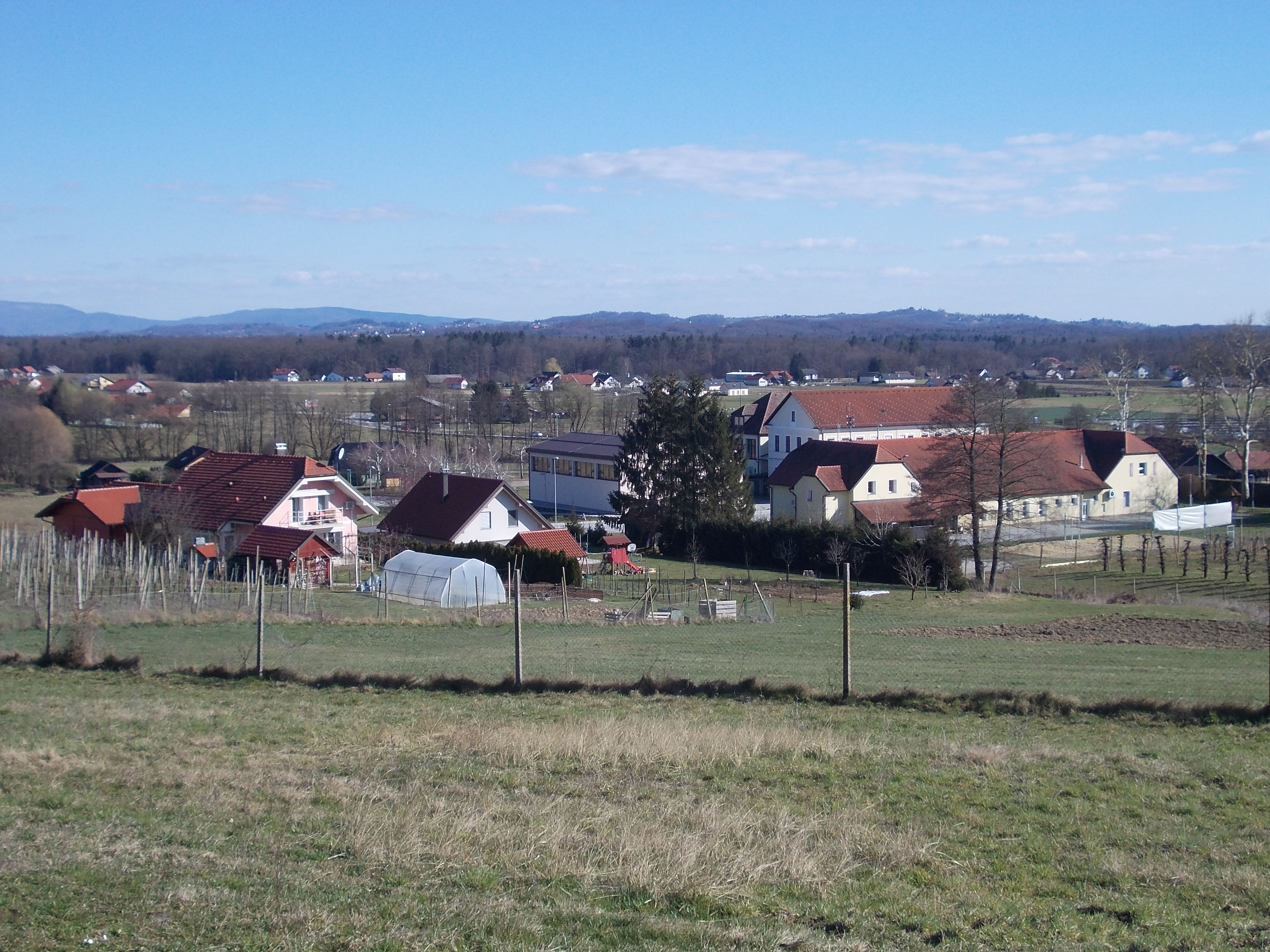

- Location in Slovenia
- Coordinates: 45°57′17.49″N 15°38′2.55″E
- Country: Slovenia
- Traditional region: Styria
- Statistical region: Lower Sava
- Municipality: Brežice

Area
  - Total: 4.29 km^{2} (1.66 sq mi)
- Elevation: 167.5 m (550 ft)

Population (2020)
  - Total: 311
  - Density: 72.5/km^{2} (188/sq mi)

Globoko (pronounced [ɡlɔˈbɔːkɔ]) is a village in the Municipality of Brežice in eastern Slovenia. The area is part of the traditional region of Styria. It is now included in the Lower Sava Statistical Region.

A V-shaped monument in the village was erected in 1953 and renovated in 1985 to commemorate 34 local Partisans and 57 other victims of the Second World War.
