= Dednja Vas =

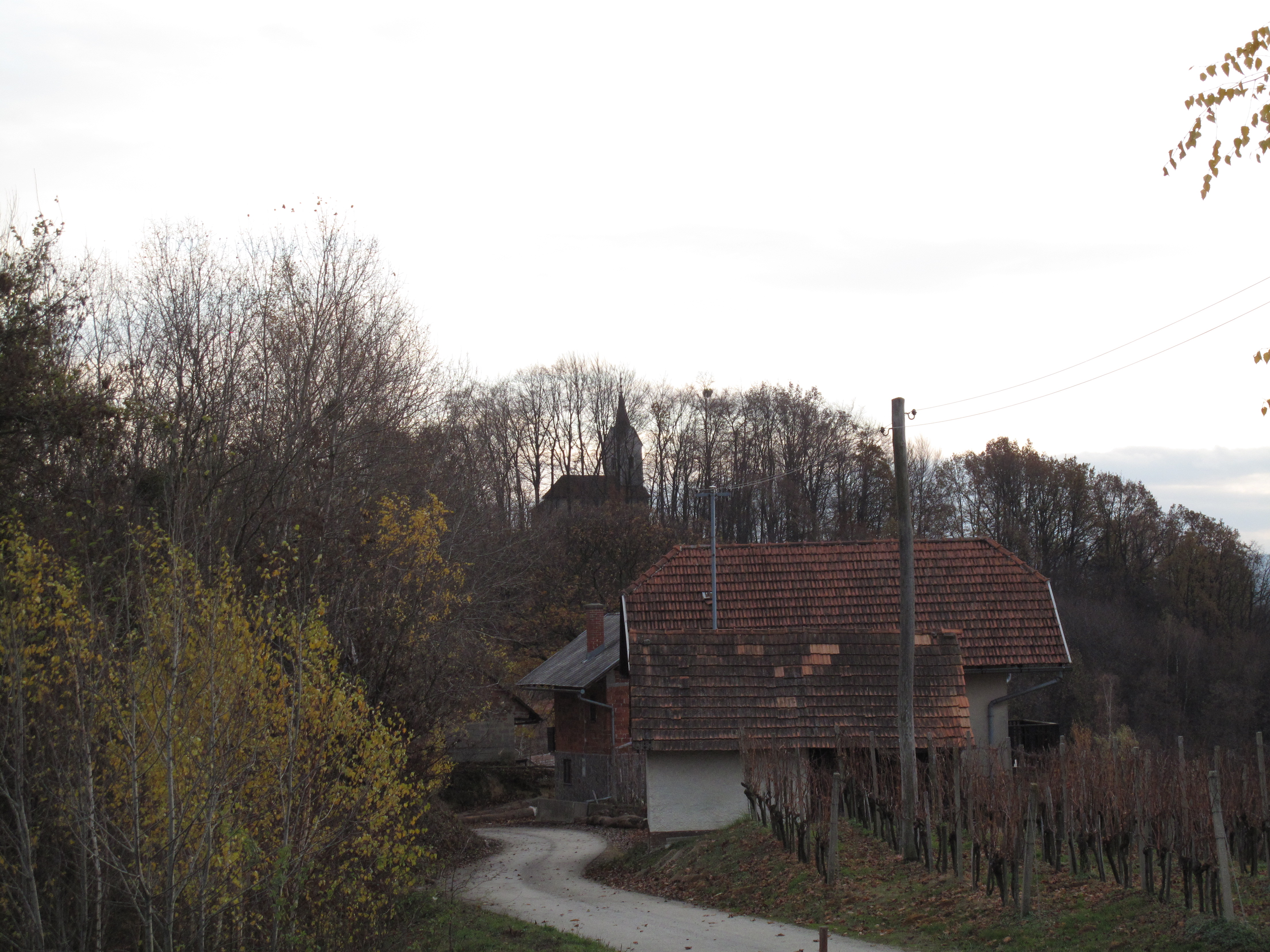
- View of St. Barbara's Church in Blatno from Dednja Vas

- Location in Slovenia
- Coordinates: 45°58′42.55″N 15°38′25.82″E
- Country: Slovenia
- Traditional region: Styria
- Statistical region: Lower Sava
- Municipality: Brežice

Area
  - Total: 2.7 km^{2} (1.0 sq mi)
- Elevation: 245.4 m (805 ft)

Population (2020)
  - Total: 176
  - Density: 65/km^{2} (170/sq mi)

Dednja Vas (pronounced [ˈdeːdnja ˈʋaːs]; Slovene: Dednja vas, German: Dittmannsdorf) is a settlement in the Municipality of Brežice in eastern Slovenia. The area is part of the traditional region of Styria. It is now included with the rest of the municipality in the Lower Sava Statistical Region. It includes the hamlets of Babniki (a.k.a. Zakozolec), Cerenja Gorca, Dole, Gaberska Gorca, Sveti Križ (German: Heiligenkreuz), Rapovce (German: Rapowitz), Sela, Veliko Bukovje, Veseli Vrh (German: Freudenberg), and Vošni Dol (German: Aschenthal).

The local church, built on a hill above the settlement, is dedicated to the Holy Cross and belongs to the Parish of Pišece. It is a Gothic building with ribbed vaults and trefoil mouldings on its windows. It was remodelled in the 18th century, but still retains these original features.
