= Dolenja Vas pri Artičah =

- Location in Slovenia
- Coordinates: 45°56′58.78″N 15°33′40.9″E
- Country: Slovenia
- Traditional region: Styria
- Statistical region: Lower Sava
- Municipality: Brežice

Area
  - Total: 0.97 km^{2} (0.37 sq mi)
- Elevation: 171.5 m (563 ft)

Population (2020)
  - Total: 97
  - Density: 100/km^{2} (260/sq mi)

Dolenja Vas pri Artičah (pronounced [dɔˈleːnja ˈʋaːs pɾi aɾˈtiːtʃax]; Slovene: Dolenja vas pri Artičah, German: Niederdorf) is a village west of Artiče in the Municipality of Brežice in eastern Slovenia. The area is part of the traditional region of Styria. It is now included with the rest of the municipality in the Lower Sava Statistical Region.

== Name ==
The name of the settlement was changed from Dolenja vas to Dolenja vas pri Artičah in 1953. In the past the German name was Niederdorf.
