= Brezje pri Veliki Dolini =

- Location in Slovenia
- Coordinates: 45°50′38″N 15°39′14.93″E
- Country: Slovenia
- Traditional region: Lower Carniola
- Statistical region: Lower Sava
- Municipality: Brežice

Area
  - Total: 2.37 km^{2} (0.92 sq mi)
- Elevation: 287.9 m (945 ft)

Population (2020)
  - Total: 91
  - Density: 38/km^{2} (99/sq mi)

Brezje pri Veliki Dolini (pronounced [ˈbɾeːzjɛ pɾi ˈʋeːliki ˈdoːlini]) is a settlement in the Municipality of Brežice in eastern Slovenia. The area is part of the traditional region of Lower Carniola. It is now included in the Lower Sava Statistical Region.

== Name ==
Brezje pri Veliki Dolini was attested in written sources as Pirgk in 1455. The name of the settlement was changed from Brezje to Brezje pri Veliki Dolini in 1953.
