= Municipality of Brežice =

Municipality of Slovenia

Municipality of Brežice Občina Brežice
- Municipality
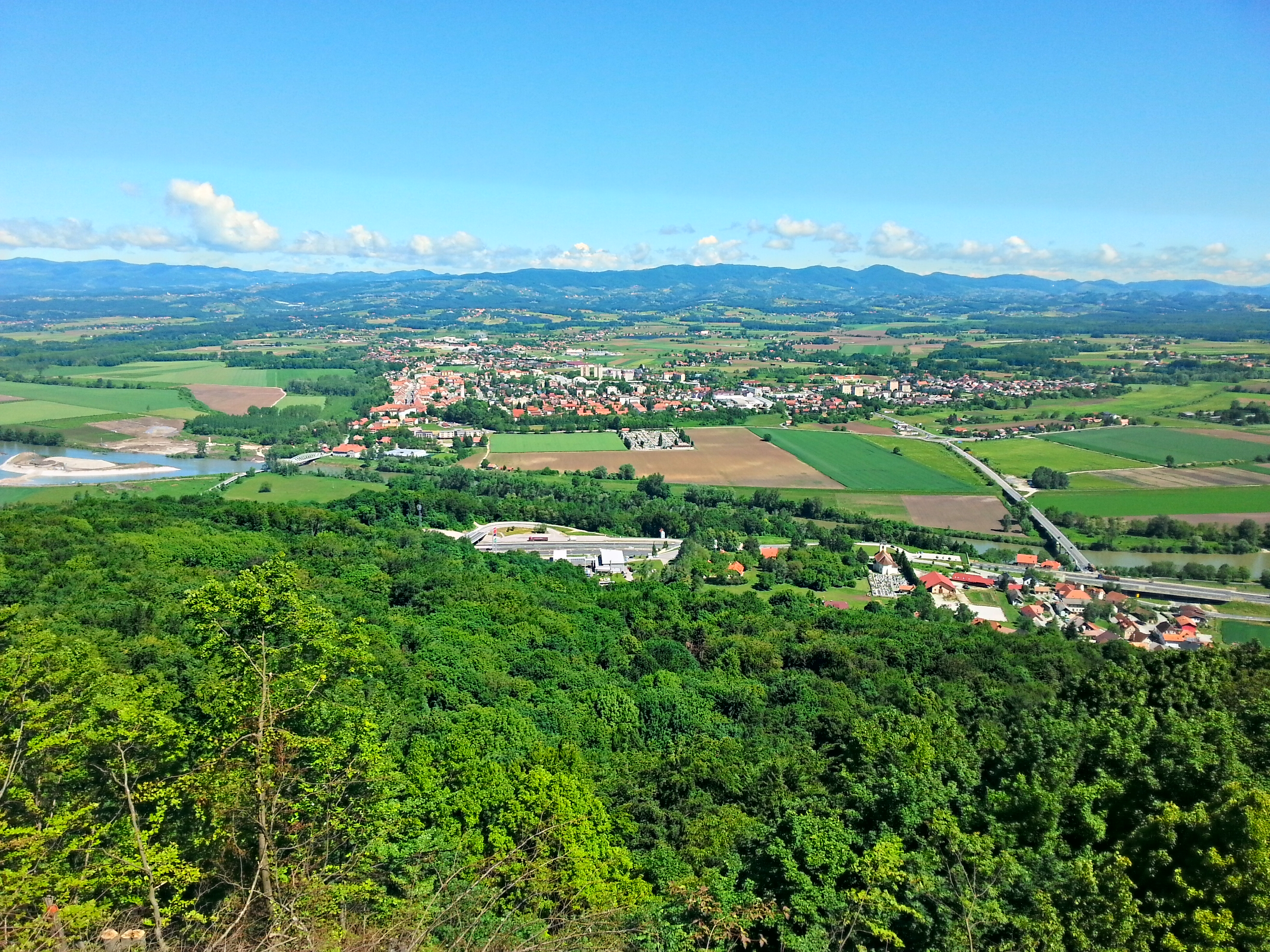

- Location of the Municipality of Brežice in Slovenia
- Coordinates: 45°54′N 15°35′E
- Country: Slovenia

Government
  - Mayor: Ivan Molan (SDS)

Area
  - Total: 268.1 km^{2} (103.5 sq mi)

Population (2002)
  - Total: 24,483
  - Density: 91.32/km^{2} (236.5/sq mi)
- Time zone: UTC+01 (CET)
  - Summer (DST): UTC+02 (CEST)
- Website: www.brezice.si
- Source: Statistical Office of the Republic of Slovenia, census of 2002.

The Municipality of Brežice (pronounced [ˈbɾèːʒitsɛ]; Slovene: Občina Brežice) is a municipality in eastern Slovenia in the Lower Sava Valley along the border with Croatia. The seat of the municipality is the town of Brežice. The area was traditionally divided between Lower Styria (territory on the left bank of the Sava River) and Lower Carniola (territory on the right bank of the Sava River). The entire municipality is now included in the Lower Sava Statistical Region.

== Geography ==
Brežice is one of the largest municipalities in Slovenia. It lies at the confluence of the Sava and Krka rivers and also stands at the junction of a number of international traffic routes.

=== Settlements ===
In addition to the municipal seat of Brežice, the municipality also includes the following settlements:

1. Arnovo Selo
2. Artiče
3. Bizeljska Vas
4. Bizeljsko
5. Blatno
6. Bojsno
7. Boršt
8. Bračna Vas
9. Brezje pri Bojsnem
10. Brezje pri Veliki Dolini
11. Brezovica na Bizeljskem
12. Brvi
13. Bukošek
14. Bukovje
15. Bušeča Vas
16. Čatež ob Savi
17. Čedem
18. Cerina
19. Cerklje ob Krki
20. Cirnik
21. Črešnjice pri Cerkljah
22. Cundrovec
23. Curnovec
24. Dečno Selo
25. Dednja Vas
26. Dobeno
27. Dobova
28. Dolenja Pirošica
29. Dolenja Vas pri Artičah
30. Dolenje Skopice
31. Dramlja
32. Drenovec pri Bukovju
33. Dvorce
34. Gabrje pri Dobovi
35. Gaj
36. Gazice
37. Globočice
38. Globoko
39. Glogov Brod
40. Gorenja Pirošica
41. Gorenje Skopice
42. Gornji Lenart
43. Gregovce
44. Hrastje pri Cerkljah
45. Izvir
46. Jereslavec
47. Jesenice
48. Kamence
49. Kapele
50. Koritno
51. Kraška Vas
52. Križe
53. Krška Vas
54. Laze
55. Loče
56. Mala Dolina
57. Mali Cirnik
58. Mali Obrež
59. Mali Vrh
60. Mihalovec
61. Mostec
62. Mrzlava Vas
63. Nova Vas ob Sotli
64. Nova Vas pri Mokricah
65. Obrežje
66. Oklukova Gora
67. Orešje na Bizeljskem
68. Pavlova Vas
69. Pečice
70. Perišče
71. Piršenbreg
72. Pišece
73. Podgorje pri Pišecah
74. Podgračeno
75. Podvinje
76. Ponikve
77. Poštena Vas
78. Prilipe
79. Račja Vas
80. Rajec
81. Rakovec
82. Ribnica
83. Rigonce
84. Sela pri Dobovi
85. Silovec
86. Slogonsko
87. Slovenska Vas
88. Sobenja Vas
89. Spodnja Pohanca
90. Sromlje
91. Stankovo
92. Stara Vas–Bizeljsko
93. Stojanski Vrh
94. Trebež
95. Velika Dolina
96. Velike Malence
97. Veliki Obrež
98. Vinji Vrh
99. Vitna Vas
100. Volčje
101. Vrhje
102. Vrhovska Vas
103. Zasap
104. Žejno
105. Zgornja Pohanca
106. Zgornji Obrež
107. Župeča Vas
108. Župelevec

== Tourism ==
The area's many hot springs have contributed to the development of the largest natural spa and the second largest tourist center in Slovenia, Čateške Toplice (the Terme Čatež Thermal Health Resort). The Municipality of Brežice also offers visitors recreation and entertainment, as well as sports including hunting and fishing. The surrounding hills are ideal for fruit growing and viticulture. The vineyards of the Bizeljsko and Pišece districts are renowned for their top-quality wines.
