= Račja Vas, Slovenia =

Račja Vas
- Location in Slovenia
- Coordinates: 45°53′2.34″N 15°32′28.47″E
- Country: Slovenia
- Traditional region: Lower Carniola
- Statistical region: Lower Sava
- Municipality: Brežice

Area
  - Total: 1.22 km^{2} (0.47 sq mi)
- Elevation: 153.9 m (505 ft)

Population (2020)
  - Total: 116
  - Density: 95.1/km^{2} (246/sq mi)

Račja Vas (pronounced [ˈɾaːtʃja ˈʋaːs]; Slovene: Račja vas) is a village on the left bank of the Krka River in the Municipality of Brežice in eastern Slovenia. The area is part of the traditional region of Lower Carniola. It is now included with the rest of the municipality in the Lower Sava Statistical Region.
