= Volčje, Brežice =

Volčje
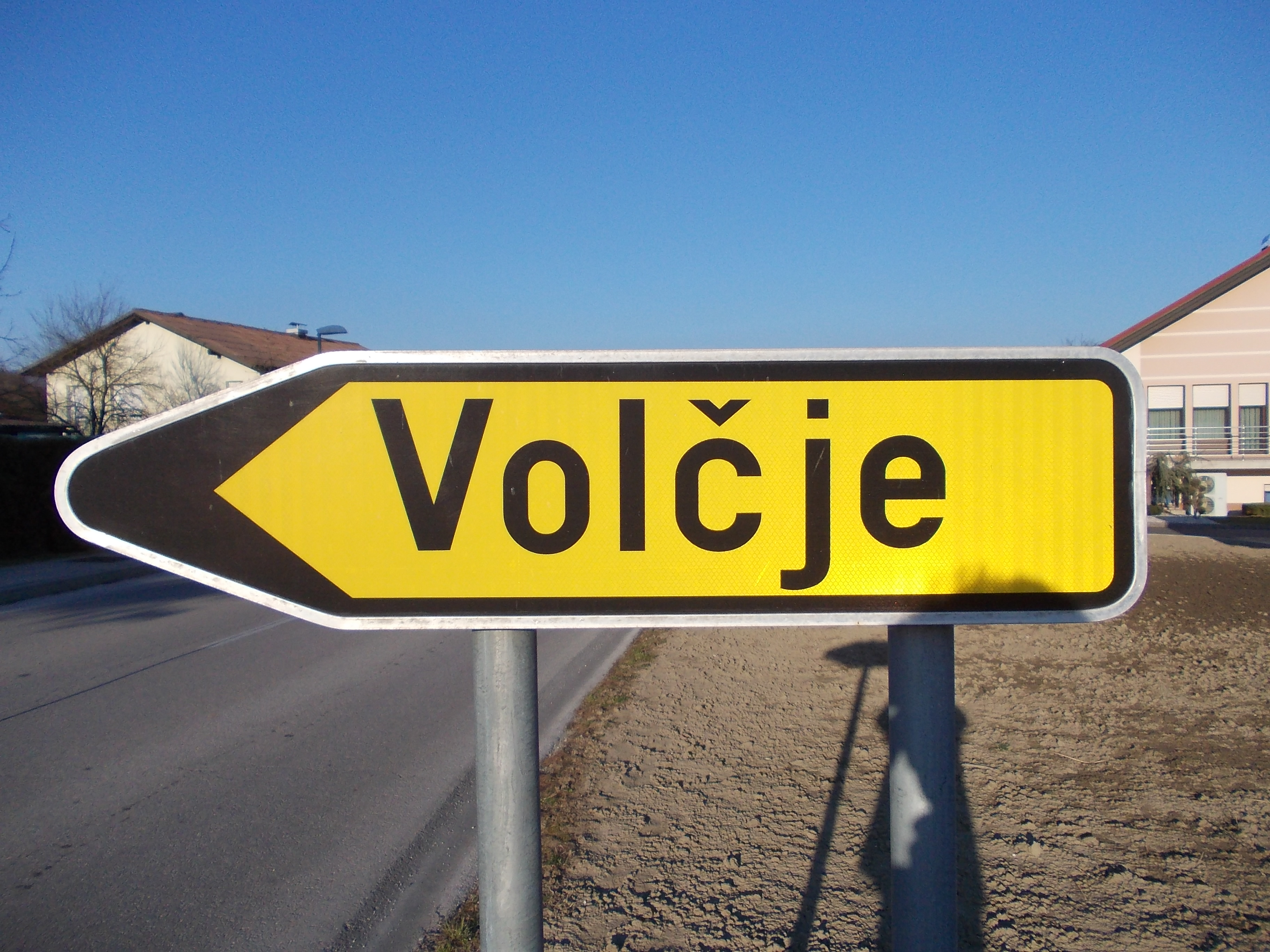

- Location in Slovenia
- Coordinates: 45°58′55.06″N 15°34′46.66″E
- Country: Slovenia
- Traditional region: Styria
- Statistical region: Lower Sava
- Municipality: Brežice

Area
  - Total: 3.14 km^{2} (1.21 sq mi)
- Elevation: 282.9 m (928 ft)

Population (2024)
  - Total: 99
  - Density: 32/km^{2} (82/sq mi)

Volčje (pronounced [ʋɔu̯ˈtʃjeː], German: Woltschje) is a village in the hills north of Brežice in the Municipality of Brežice in eastern Slovenia. The area is part of the traditional region of Styria. It is now included with the rest of the municipality in the Lower Sava Statistical Region.

== History ==
On 1 July 1936 the boundary at the southern end of Volčje was redrawn, and the village lost 7 houses (28 people) to the adjoining village of Artiče.

== Church ==
There is a small church dedicated to Saint John of Nepomuk.
