= Blatno =

Blatno may refer to places:

== Czech Republic ==
- Blatno (Chomutov District), a municipality and village in the Ústí nad Labem Region
- Blatno (Louny District), a municipality and village in the Ústí nad Labem Region
- Blatno, a part of Hlinsko in the Pardubice Region

== Slovenia ==
- Blatno, Brežice, a settlement in the Municipality of Brežice
