= Pišece Castle =

Castle in Pišece, Slovenia

- grad Pišece
- Pišece (Municipality of Brežice, southeastern Slovenia
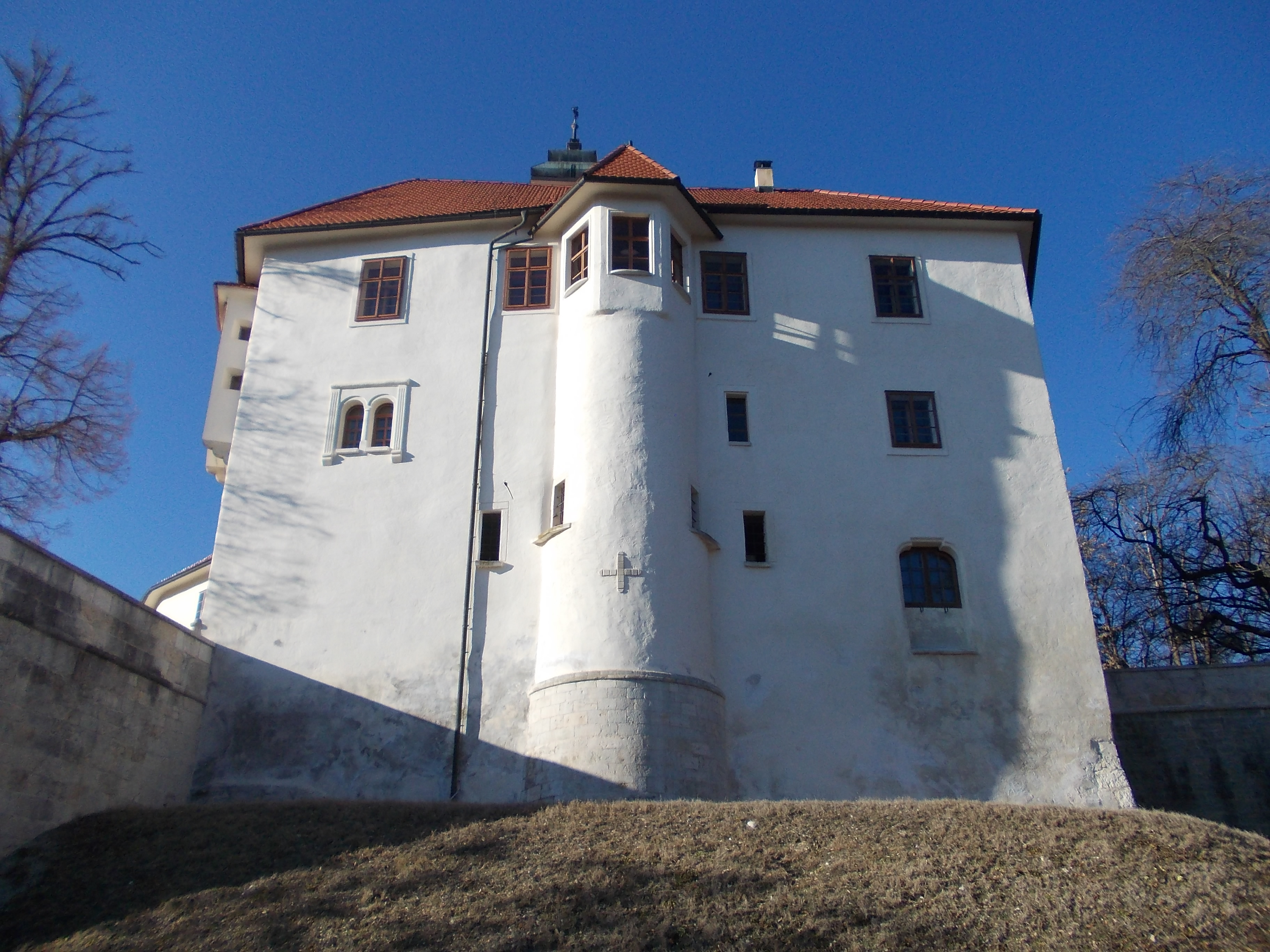

Location
- Location in Slovenia
- Location within Slovenia
- Coordinates: 46.006111°N 15.636944°E

Site history
- Built: before 1329

Pišece Castle (Slovene: grad Pišece, German: Schloss Pischätz) is a castle in Pišece, Slovenia.

== History ==
The castle appears for the first time in written sources in 1329, and was built to serve the Archbishopric of Salzburg who had estates in the area. The archbishops kept the feudal rights over the castle until 1803, although the castle had been bought in 1595 by the Moscon noble family. A lawsuit determining the proper ownership of the castle was not concluded until 1637, however; it ruled in the favour of the Moscon family. The family owned the castle until the end of World War II. Reconstruction works have been carried out at the castle in 1568, during the Baroque era, in 1867 and 1884.
