= Marianne Elisabeth Lloyd-Dolbey =

Slovenian civil servant

Datin Marianne Elisabeth Lloyd-Dolbey PSNB PSLJ SPMB POAS PHBS PJK
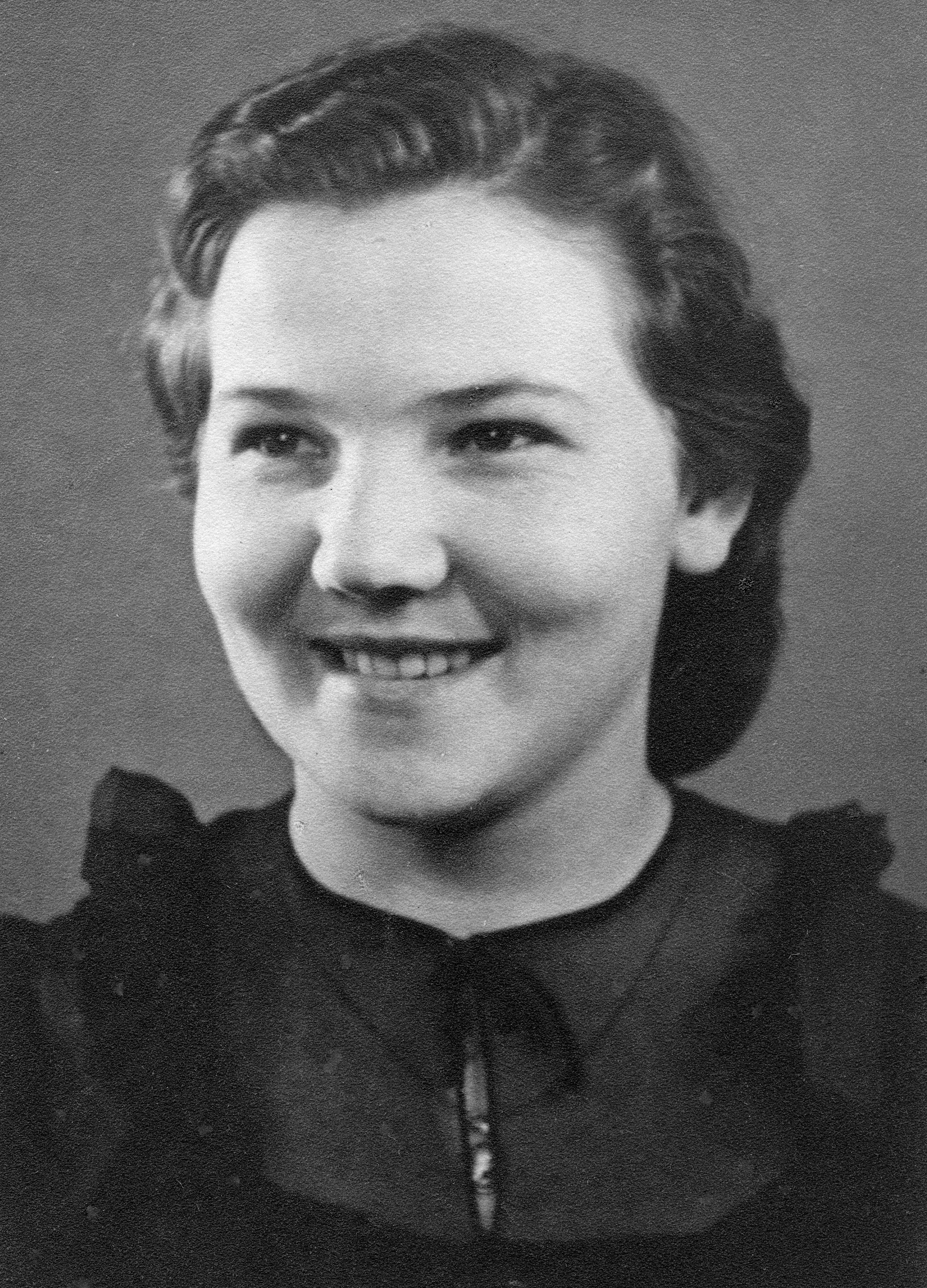
- Born: Marjana Elizabeta Kopše; 18 October 1919; Drešinja Vas, Kingdom of Yugoslavia (now Slovenia)
- Died: 10 October 1994 (aged 74); Celje, Slovenia
- Occupations: Personal secretary and translator
- Employers: Sultan Omar Ali Saifuddien III

Marianne Elisabeth Lloyd-Dolbey (18 October 1919, in Drešinja Vas, Kingdom of Yugoslavia – 10 October 1994, in Celje, Slovenia) was a personal secretary to Sultan of Brunei Omar Ali Saifuddien III.

== Biography ==
=== Early life and education ===
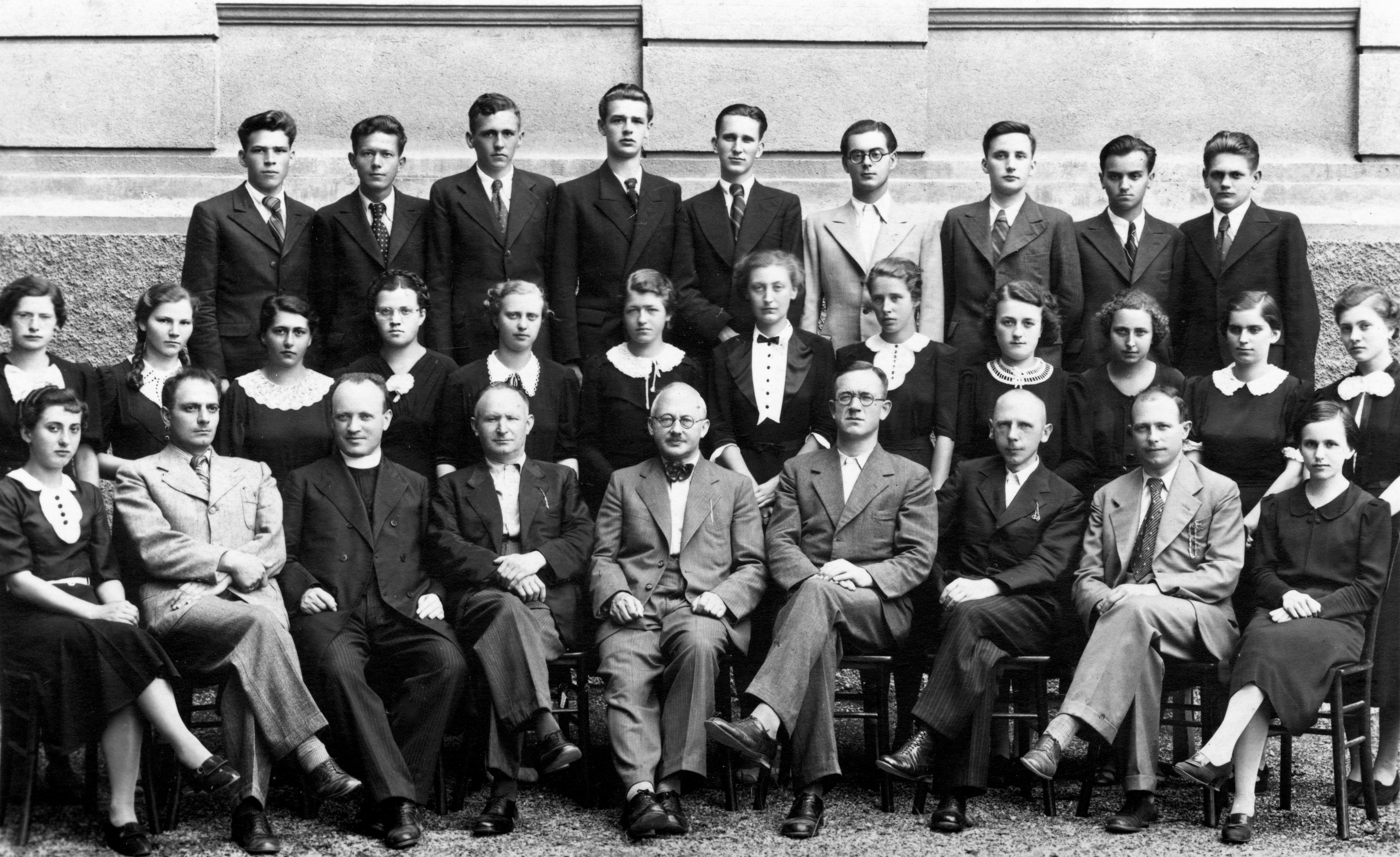
High school graduates of Celje First Grammar School, 13 June 1938. Kopše is the second from the left in the middle row. Among the professors in the first row is the third from the right Srečko Brodar, next to him, the fourth from the right, is Janko Orožen. Photography: Josip Pelikan.

Marianne was born in 1919 as Marjana Elizabeta Kopše, to father Franc and mother Marjana (born Vrabič) in Drešinja Vas, Kingdom of Yugoslavia (now Slovenia). Marjana was the first of her parents eleven children. Her family house still stands at the old main road between Drešinja Vas and Levec. After finishing primary school in Petrovče she enrolled at the Celje First Grammar School where she obtained her secondary school certificate in 1938. In the spring and summer of 1939, she learned Italian in Rome, Italy, and English in the spring of 1941 in Dresden, Saxony, Nazi Germany.

=== Career ===
During World War II, she worked as a translator at the German Embassy in Zagreb, Independent State of Croatia.

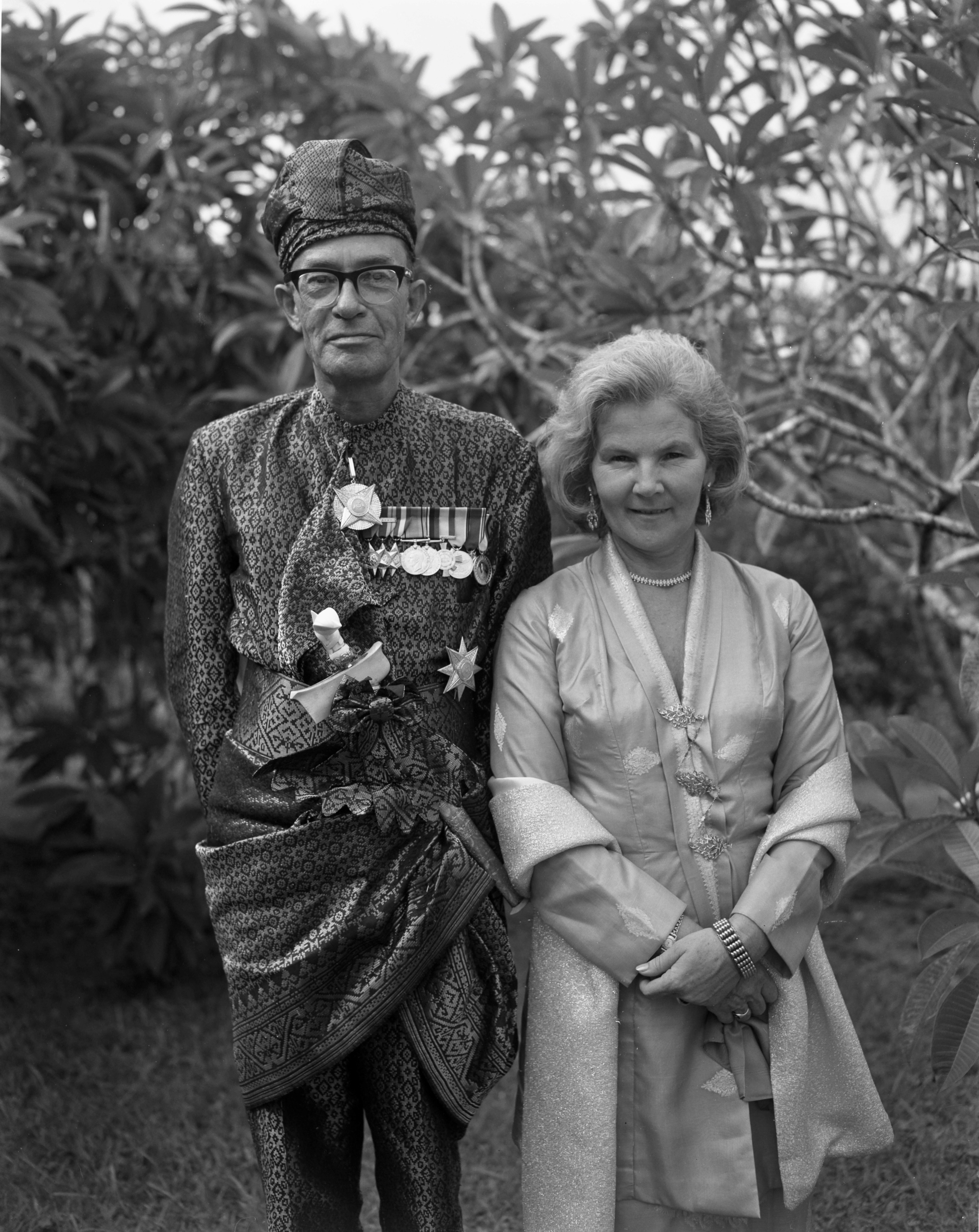
Dato Raoul Teesdale Lloyd-Dolbery and Datin Marianne Elisabeth Lloyd-Dolbey.

At the end of World War II, she retreated to Carinthia in Austria which became part of the British occupation zone of Austria. While working as a translator for the British troops in Austria she met her future husband, the English officer Raoul Teesdale Lloyd-Dolbey. They married in London in 1949, and moved to Brunei where her husband had inherited rubber plantations. Brunei was at that time a British Protectorate on the northern side of the island of Borneo.

As one of the few educated women in Brunei, she became a lady-in-waiting at the court of Raja Isteri Pengiran Anak Damit and later the personal secretary to the Queen's husband, the 28th Sultan of Brunei Omar Ali Saifuddien III. In this capacity, Lloyd-Dolbey was a close eyewitness to the introduction of the 1959 Constitution, the Brunei revolt in 1962, the voluntary abdication of Omar Ali Saifuddien III in 1967 in favour of his 21-year-old son Hassanal Bolkiah, who became the 29th and current Sultan of Brunei, the state visit of Queen Elizabeth II in Brunei in 1972, and finally the Bruneian declaration of independence from Great Britain on 1 January 1984 as a native monarchy in the Commonwealth of Nations.

Marianne assisted with the organization of receptions, visits, various celebrations, weddings, and travels abroad, in particular to England. Among her protocol assignments was to be present at childbirth in the Sultan's family. When necessary she acted also as a translator, since she was fluent in the Malay language which was spoken at the court, as well as in Brunei Malay, spoken colloquially in everyday life.

As a token of appreciation for her dedicated service to the Sultan's family, she received a number of Bruneian decorations and the Malay honorific title of a Datin.

=== Later years ===
In the 1980s, Marianne retired and moved with her husband back to Europe. She spent the summers with her husband mostly in Drešinja Vas, at her parents’ estate where the former building for drying of hops was adapted into housing.

Marianne died in 1994 in Celje. She is buried along with her husband Raoul, who died a few years before in Ljubljana, in the Kopše family grave at the cemetery in Žalec, Slovenia.

== Honours ==
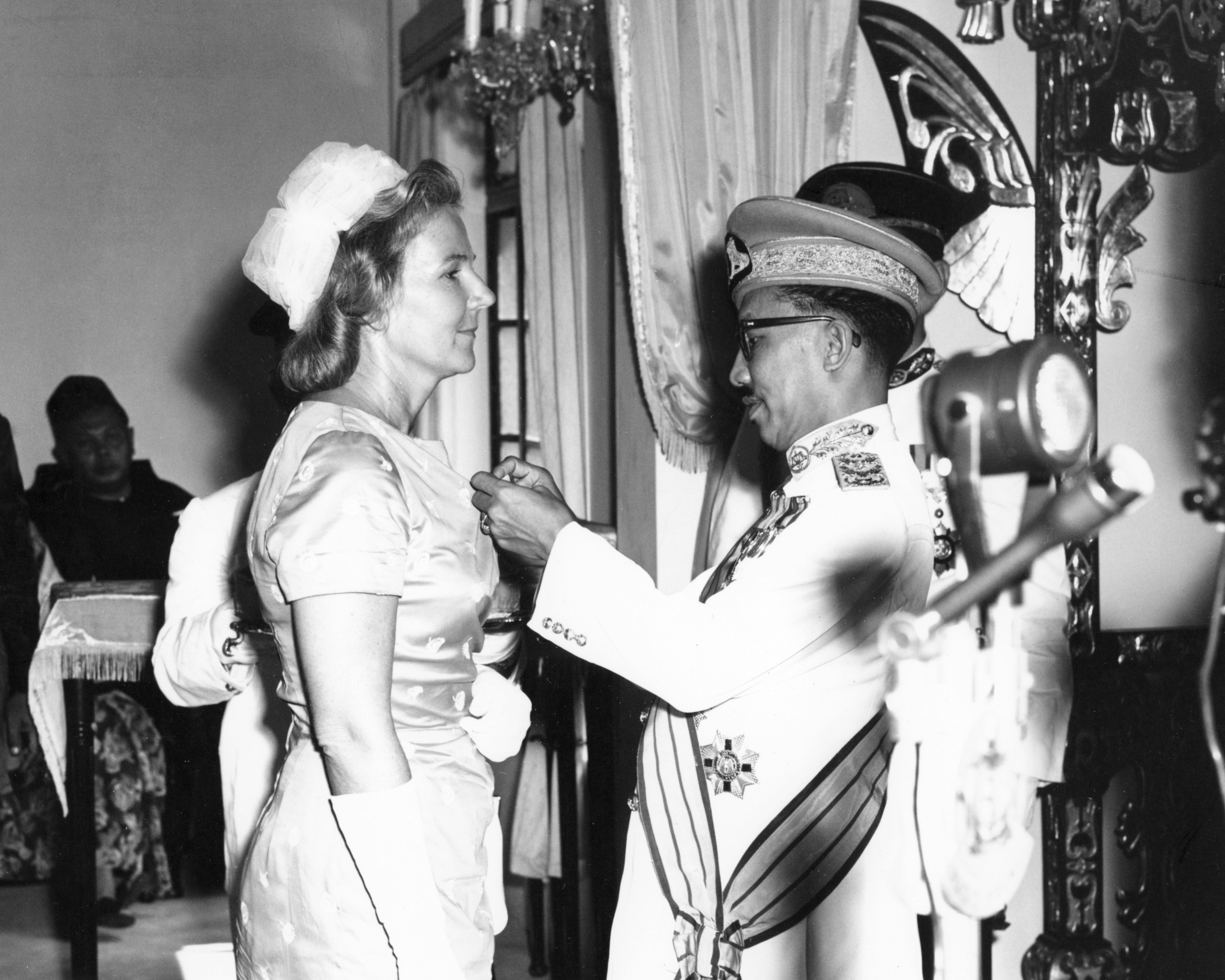
Lloyd-Dolbey receiving the decoration P.O.A.S. from Sultan Omar Ali Saifuddien III, 1960.

- Order of Setia Negara Brunei First Class (PSNB) – Datin Seri Setia (1976)
- Order of Setia Negara Brunei Second Class (DSNB) – Datin Setia
- Order of Paduka Seri Laila Jasa First Class (PSLJ) – Datin Paduka Seri Laila Jasa
- Order of Paduka Seri Laila Jasa Second Class (DSLJ; 1967) – Datin Seri Laila Jasa
- Order of Seri Paduka Mahkota Brunei First Class (SPMB; 1970) – Datin Seri Paduka
- Order of Seri Paduka Mahkota Brunei Third Class (SMB; 1964)
- Omar Ali Saifuddin Medal (POAS; 1960)
- Sultan Hassanal Bolkiah Medal (PHBS)
- Meritorious Service Medal (PJK)
- Campaign Medal (1963)
- Coronation Medal (1 August 1968)
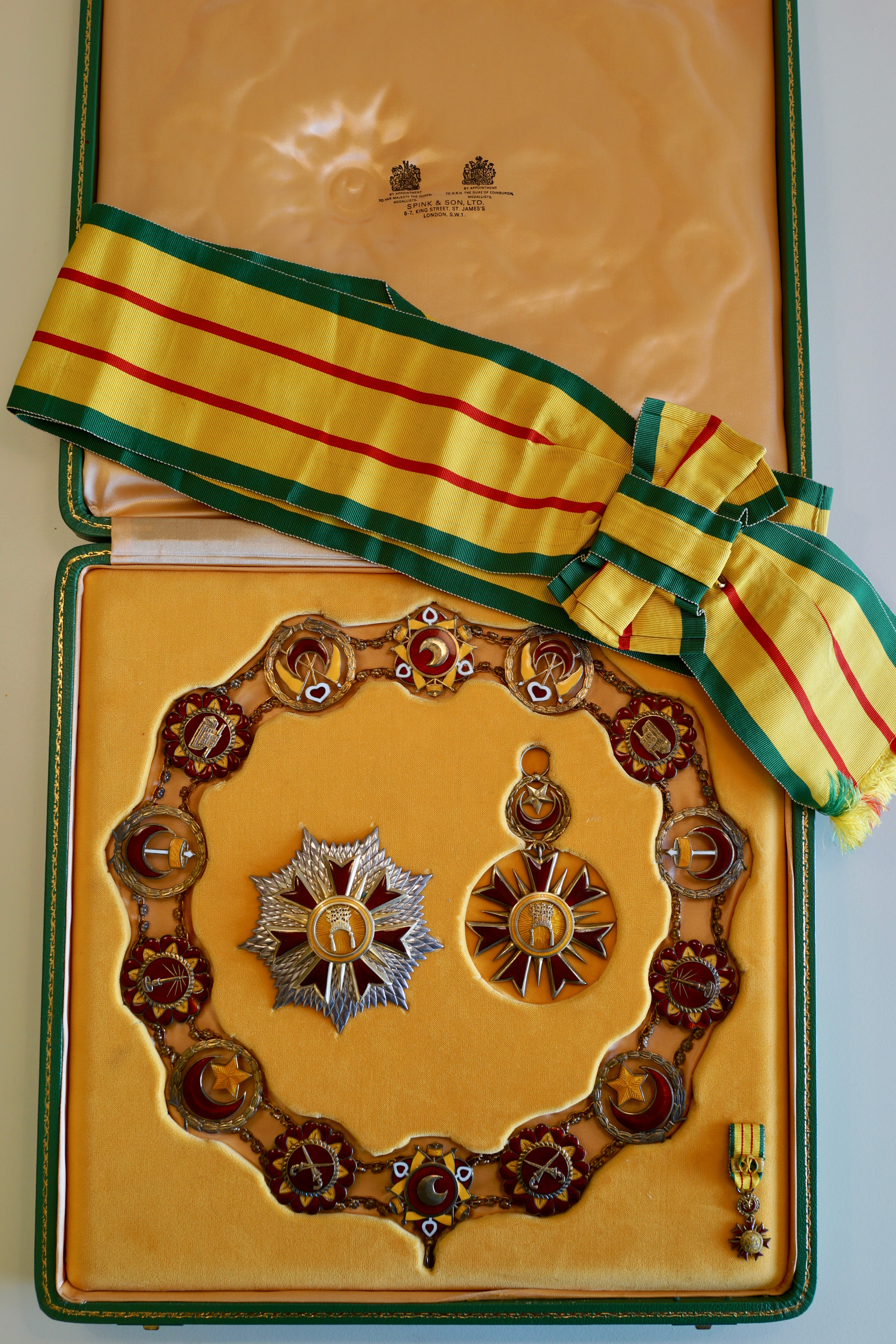
Order of Loyalty to the State of Brunei, 1st Class (Dato Seri Setia)

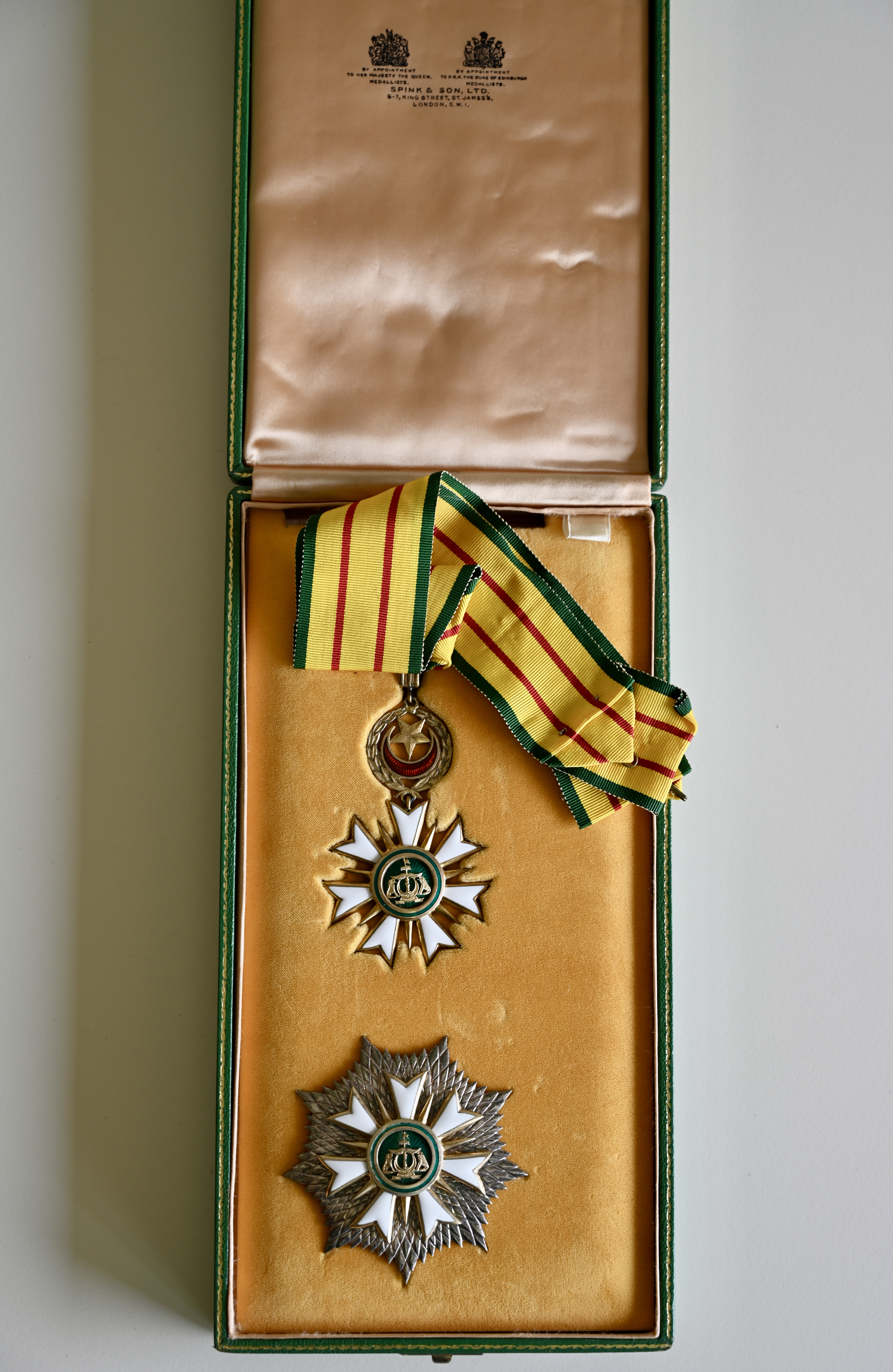
Order of Loyalty to the State of Brunei, 2nd Class (Dato Setia)

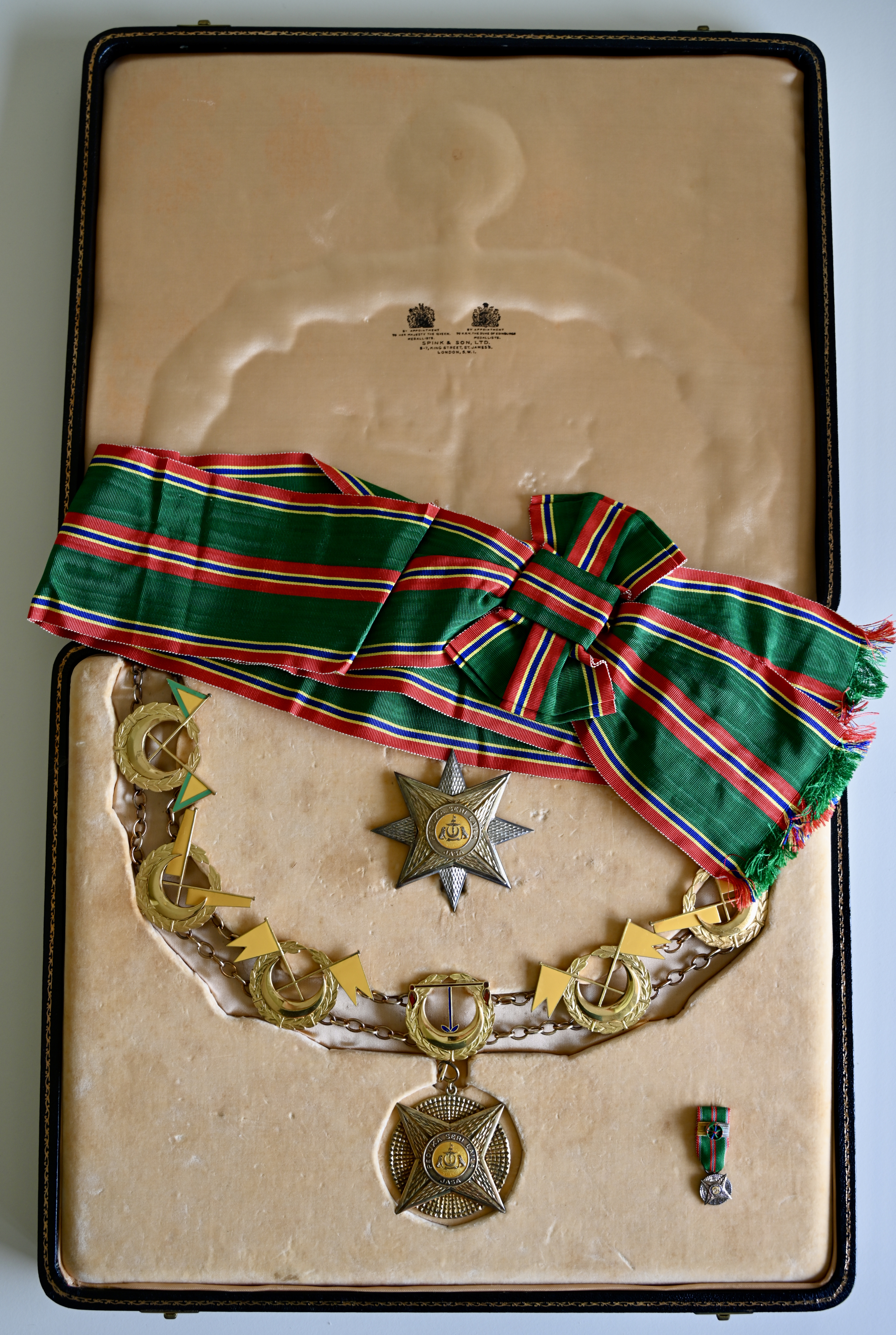
Order of Merit of Brunei, 1st Class (Dato Paduka Seri Laila Jasa)

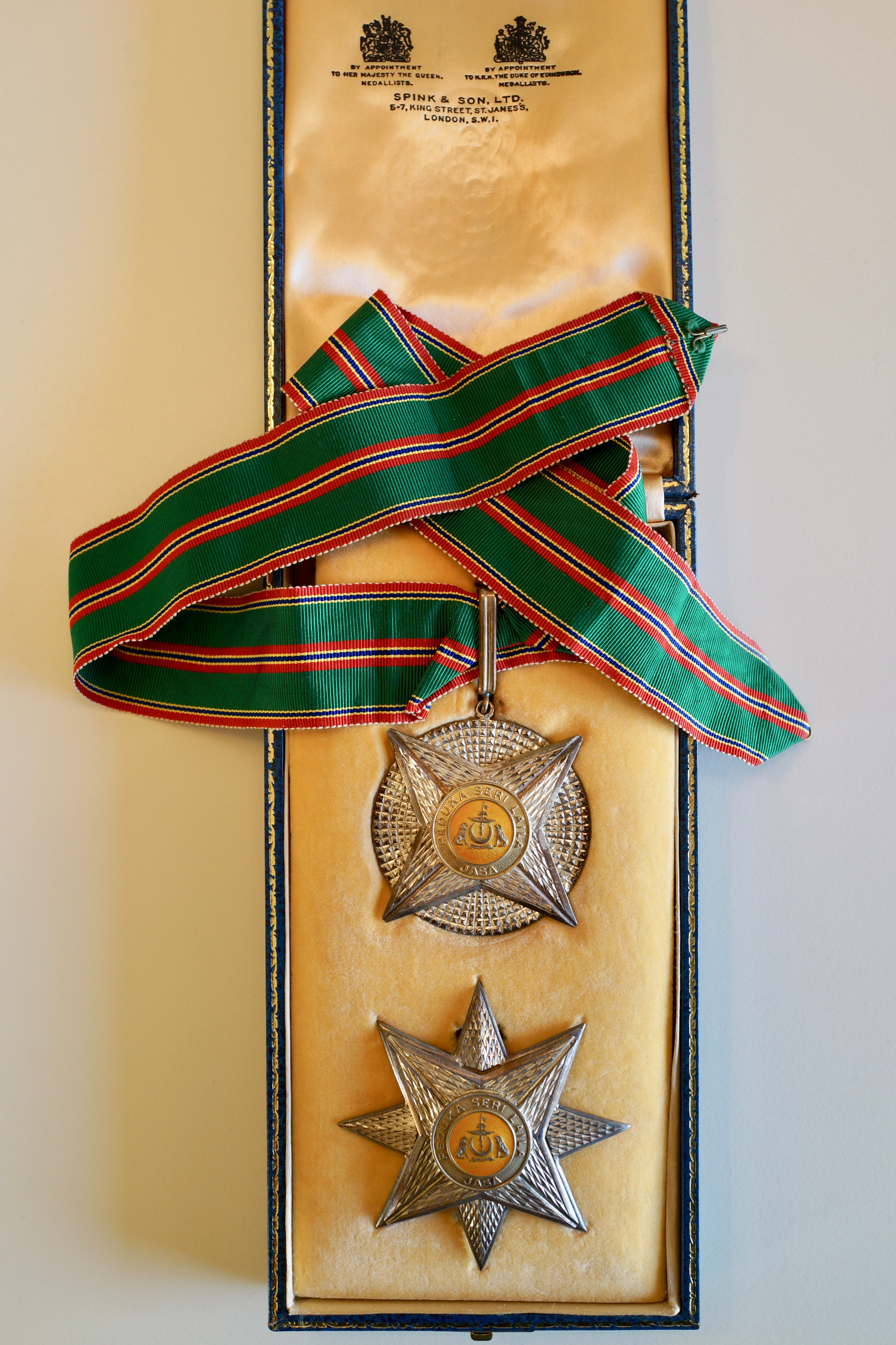
Order of Merit of Brunei, 2nd Class (Dato Seri Laila Jasa)

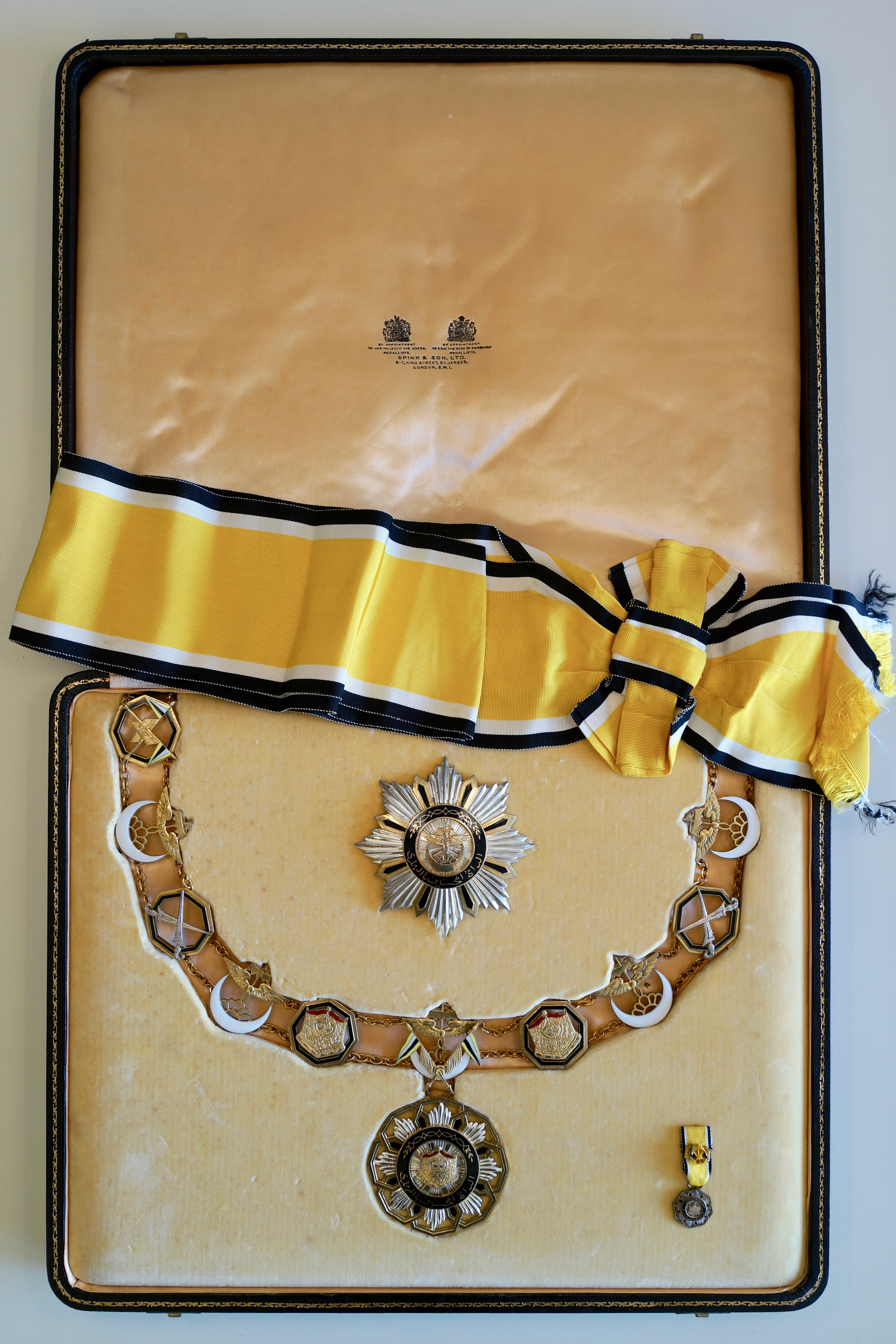
Order of the Crown of Brunei, 1st Class (Dato Seri Paduka)

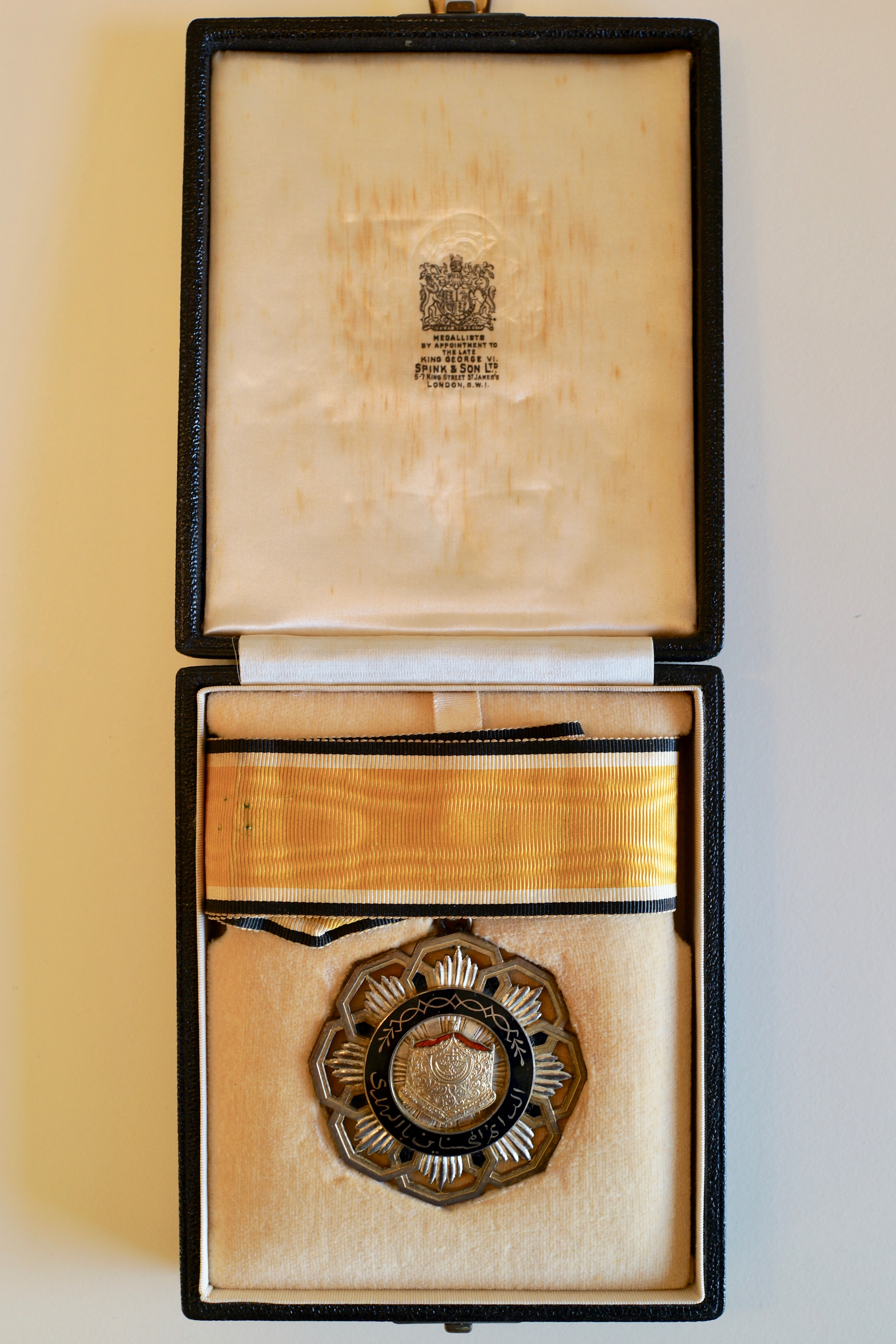
Order of the Crown of Brunei, 3rd Class (Companion)

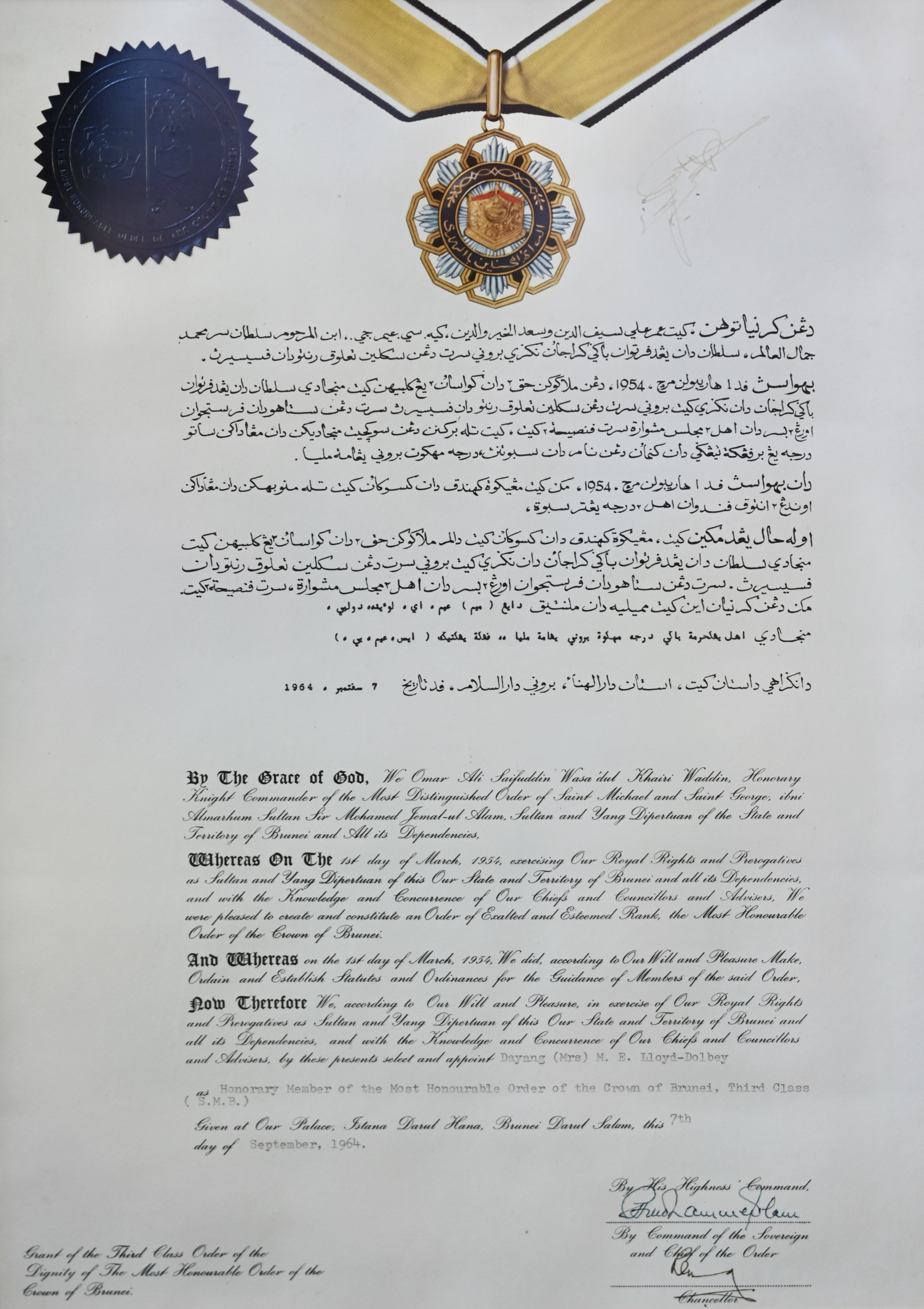
Certificate for The Most Honourable Order of the Crown of Brunei, 3rd Class

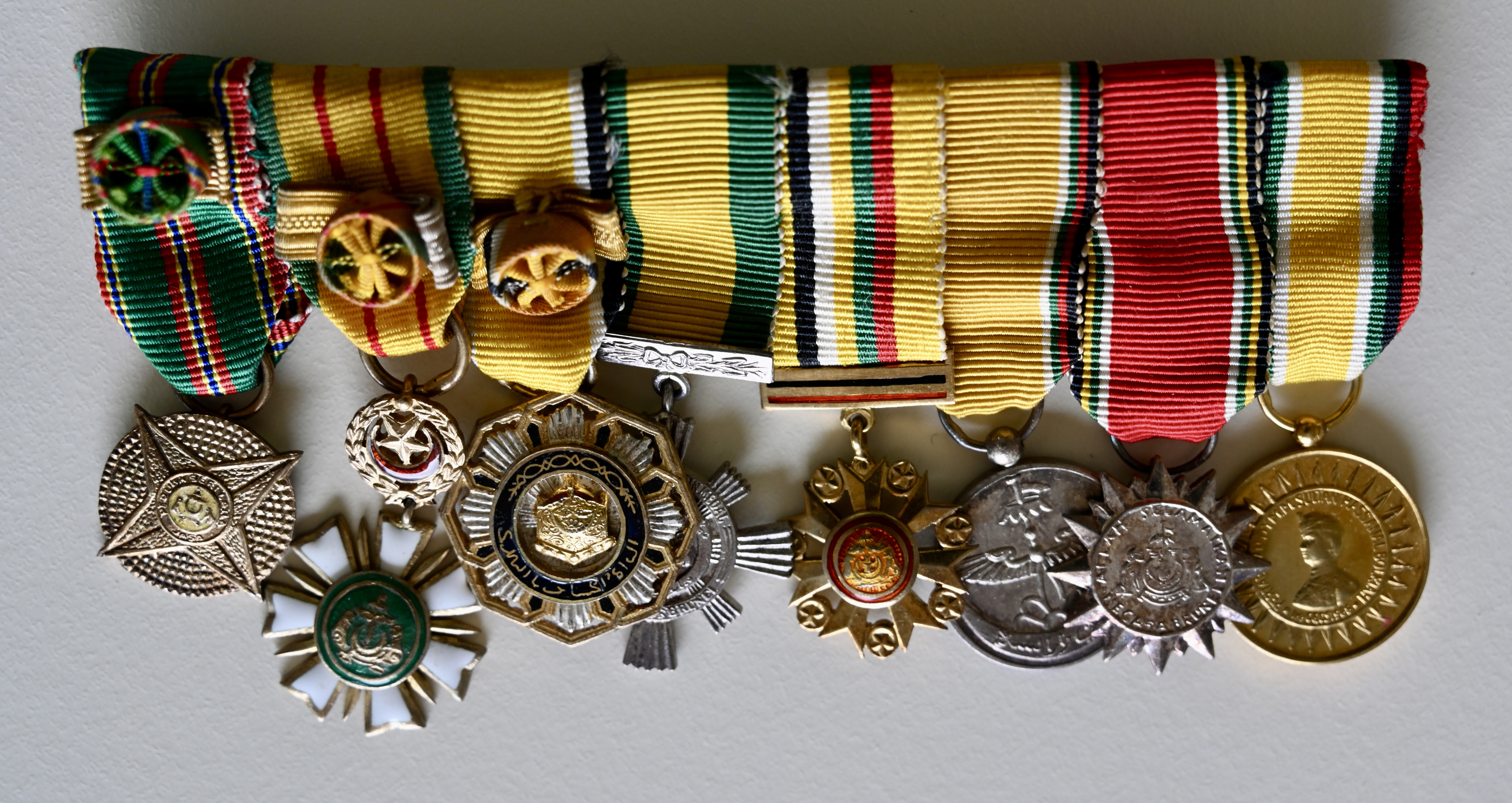
Set of miniature Bruneian medals of Datin Marianne Elisabeth Lloyd-Dolbey

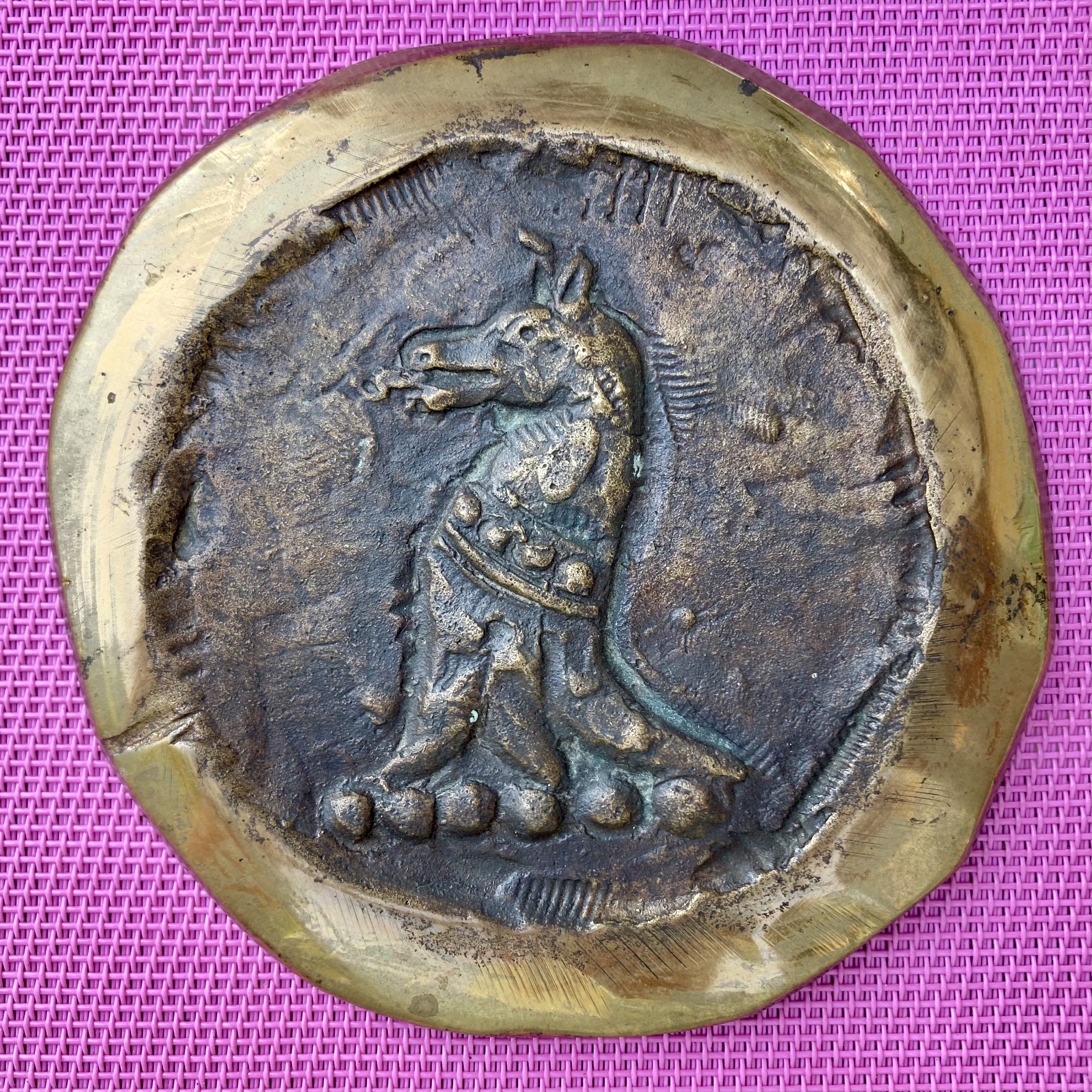
Family crest of Raoul Teesdale and Marianne Elisabeth Lloyd-Dolbey

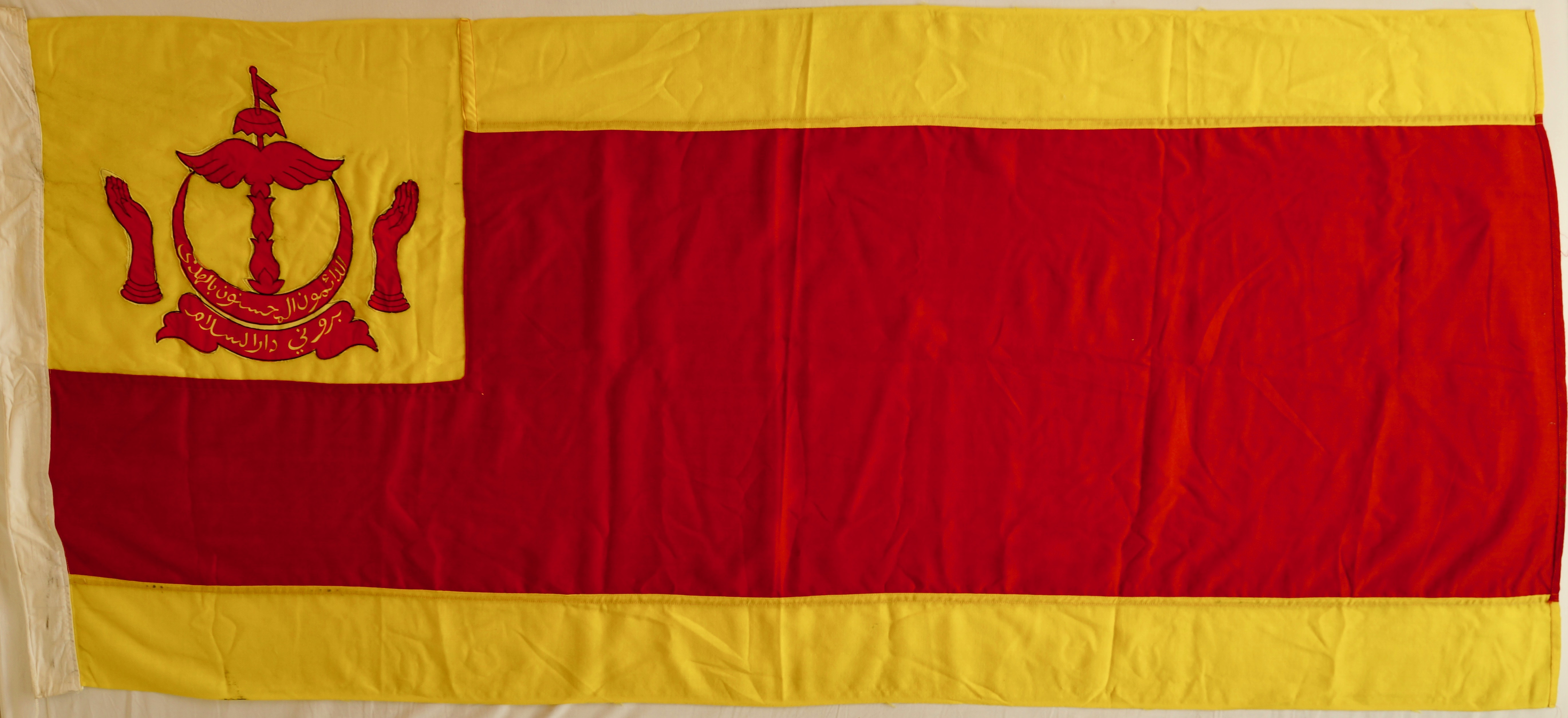
Brunei Personal Standard: Menteri (minister)

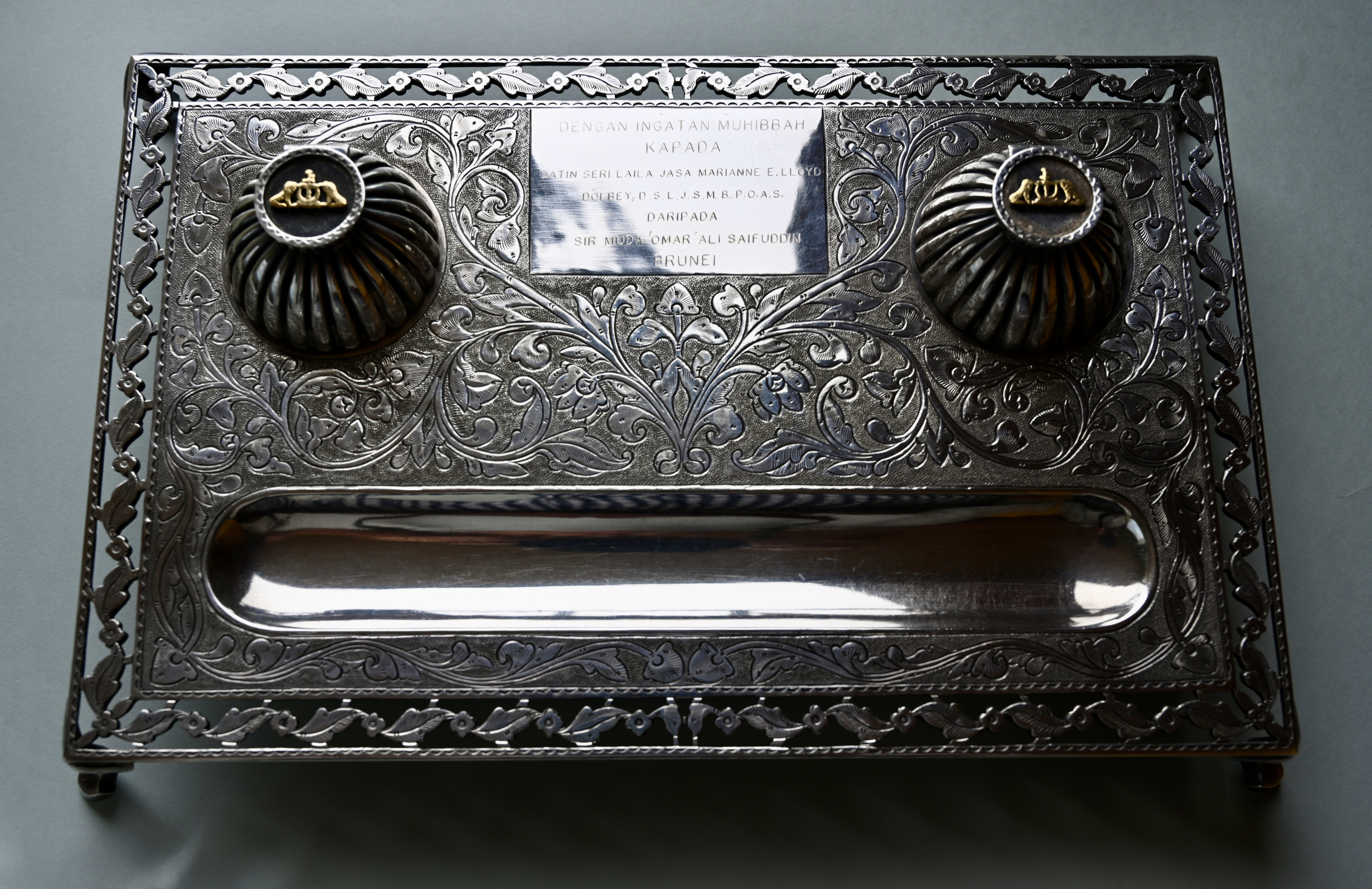
Silver inkwell with a personal dedication from the Bruneian Sultan

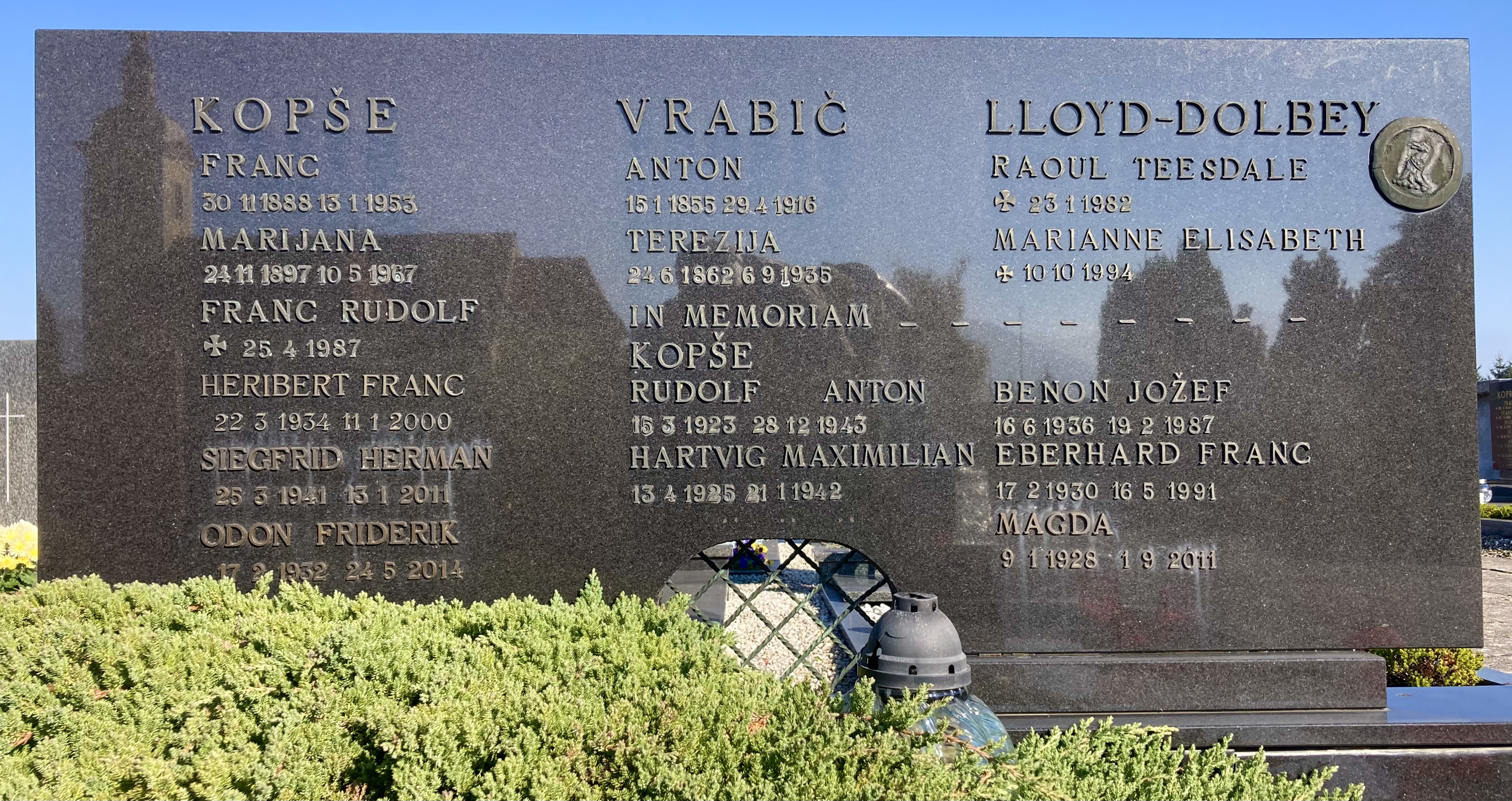
The grave of Raoul Teesdale and Marianne Elisabeth Lloyd-Dolbey
