= Blatno, Brežice =

Blatno
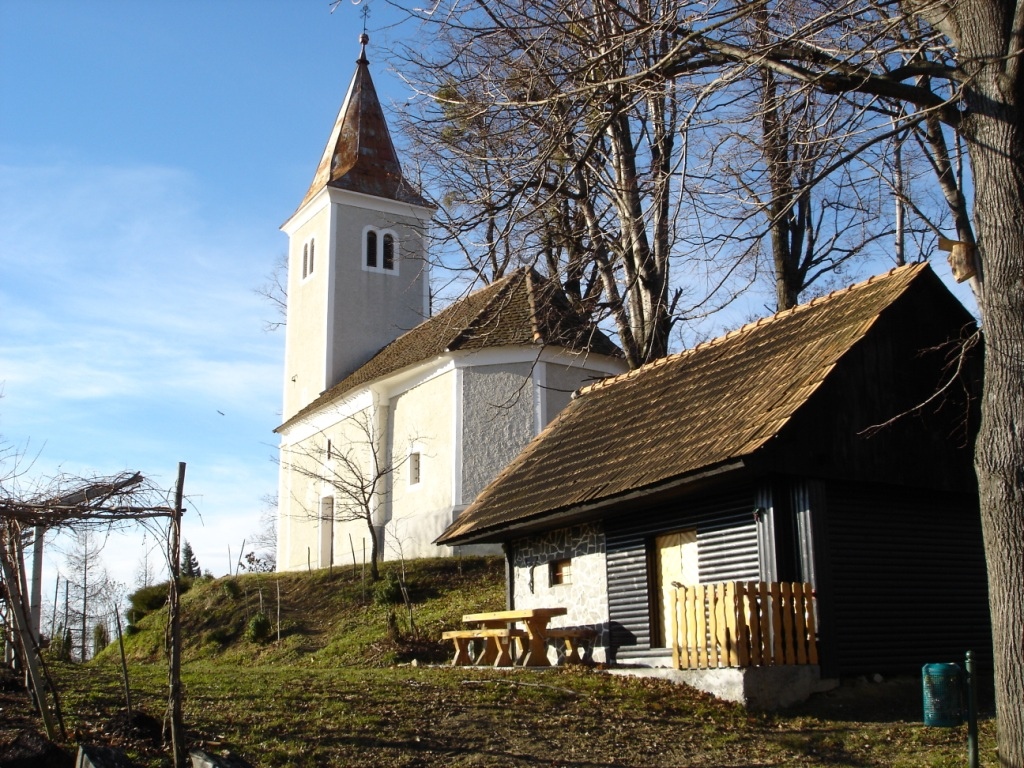

- Location in Slovenia
- Coordinates: 45°58′42.5″N 15°37′35.65″E
- Country: Slovenia
- Traditional region: Styria
- Statistical region: Lower Sava
- Municipality: Brežice

Area
  - Total: 3.51 km^{2} (1.36 sq mi)
- Elevation: 198.6 m (652 ft)

Population (2020)
  - Total: 140
  - Density: 40/km^{2} (100/sq mi)
- Postal Code: 8255

Blatno (pronounced [ˈblaːtnɔ]) is a settlement in the Municipality of Brežice in eastern Slovenia. The area is part of the traditional region of Styria. It is now included in the Lower Sava Statistical Region.

== Churches ==
There are two churches in the settlement. The first one is dedicated to Saint Bartholomew (Slovene: sveti Jernej) and belongs to the Parish of Pišece. It was built in 1693. The belfry dates to 1696. Another church. The second one, built north of the settlement on the border with the territory of the neighbouring settlement of Piršenbreg, is dedicated to Saint Barbara. It also belongs to the Parish of Pišece. It was built in the 17th century.
