= Piršenbreg =

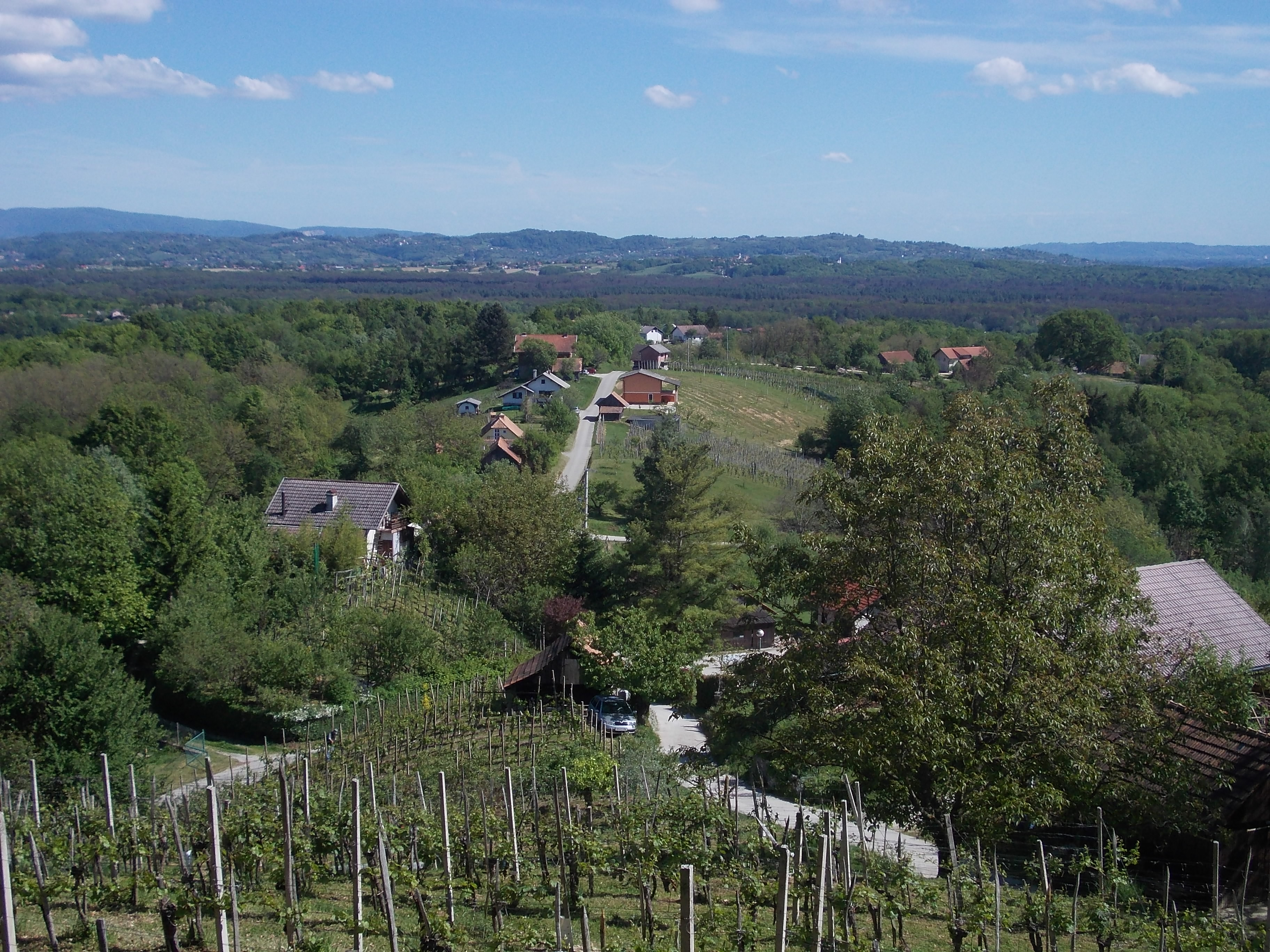

- Location in Slovenia
- Coordinates: 45°57′55.96″N 15°39′13.13″E
- Country: Slovenia
- Traditional region: Styria
- Statistical region: Lower Sava
- Municipality: Brežice

Area
  - Total: 3.81 km^{2} (1.47 sq mi)
- Elevation: 226 m (741 ft)

Population (2020)
  - Total: 260
  - Density: 68/km^{2} (180/sq mi)

Piršenbreg (pronounced [ˈpiːɾʃɛmbɾɛk]; in older sources also Piršni Breg, German: Pirschenberg) is a settlement in the hills north of Brežice in the Municipality of Brežice in eastern Slovenia. The area is part of the traditional region of Styria. It is now included with the rest of the municipality in the Lower Sava Statistical Region.

The local church, built north of the settlement on the territory of the neighbouring settlement of Blatno, is dedicated to Saint Barbara. It belongs to the Parish of Pišece. It was built in the 17th century.
