= I Gymnasium, Celje =

First Gymnasium
- I. gimnazija v Celju

Location
- Kajuhova 2 Celje; Slovenia
- 46°13′52″N 15°15′30″E

Information
- Type: general gymnasium
- Established: 1808
- Head of school: Anton Šepetavc
- Staff: 79
- Age range: 15-19
- Enrollment: 1066
- Classes: 35
- Website: www.prvagim.si

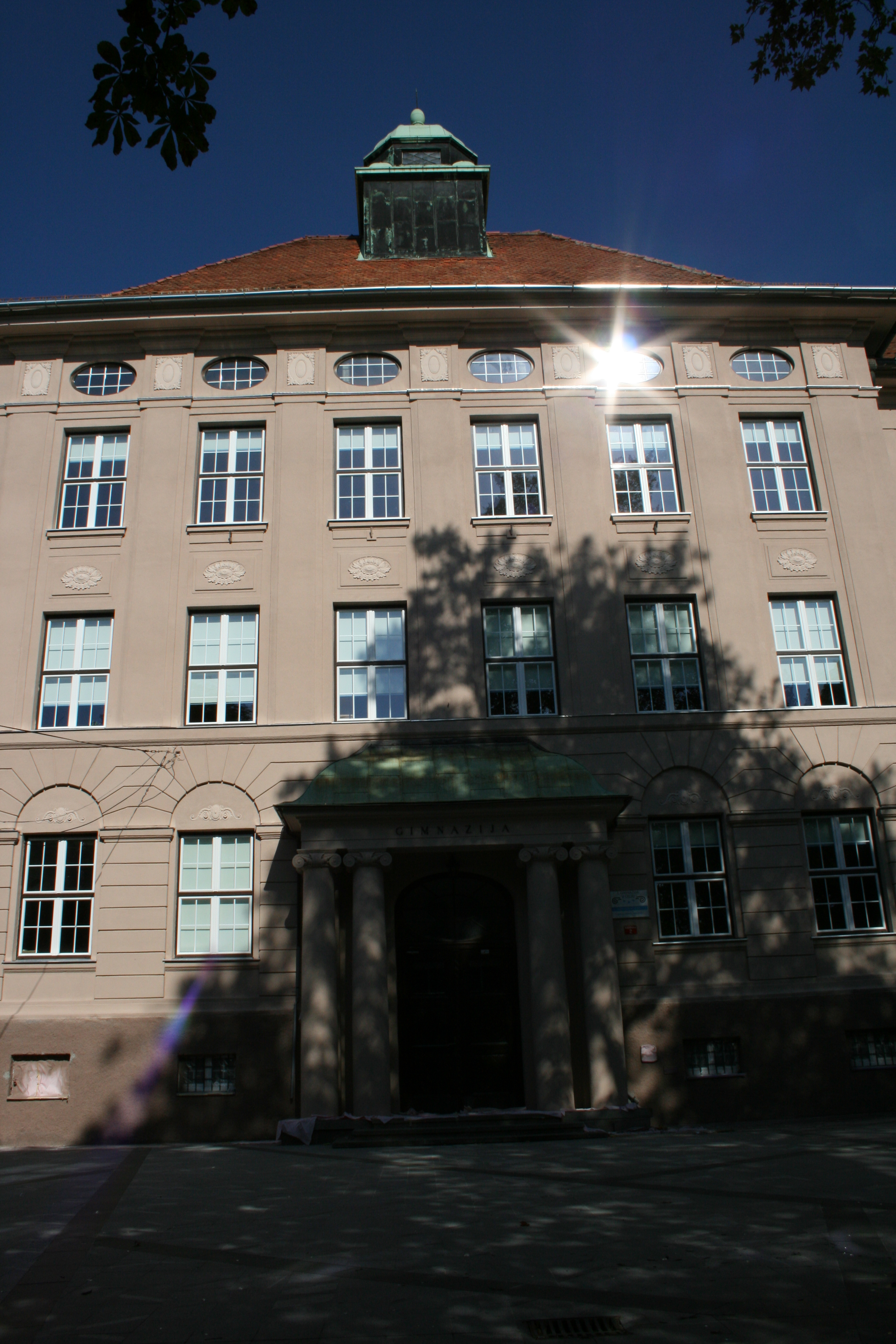
Celje First Gymnasium (main entrance)

The I Gymnasium (Slovene: I. gimnazija v Celju) is a coeducational nondenominational state gymnasium (secondary general education school for students aged between 15 and 19) in Celje, Slovenia. It was the first high school built in the region, established in 1808 by the Austrian Empire. Initially, the language of instruction was only German, although the great majority of the pupils came from the Slovene Lands. In 1895, the first classes with Slovene as the language of instruction were established. German nationalists in Austria-Hungary fiercely opposed this move, which resulted in a government crisis and fall of the cabinet of prince Alfred III. zu Windisch-Grätz. After the end of World War I and the formation of the State of Slovenes, Croats and Serbs (later Kingdom of Yugoslavia), the high school switched to Slovene as the language of instruction. During its 200-year history, many of its pupils have become prominent individuals.

== Notable alumni ==
- Anton Aškerc (1856–1912), poet
- Anton Bezenšek (1854–1915), shorthand expert and author
- Ljerka Bizilj (b. 1953), TV host
- Franjo Bobinac (b. 1958), manager
- Matej Bor (1913–1993), poet
- Marija Boršnik (1906–1982), literary historian
- Janez Cvirn (b. 1960), historian
- Gregor Čremošnik (1890–1958), historian
- Karel Destovnik Kajuh (1922–1944), poet
- Anžej Dežan (b. 1987), singer
- Julius Glowacki (1846–1915), natural scientist
- Igor Grdina (b. 1965), historian
- Benjamin Ipavec (1829–1909), physician and composer
- Romana Jordan Cizelj (b. 1966), physicist and politician, Member of the European Parliament
- Matjaž Kmecl (b. 1934), literary historian and critic
- Marianne Elisabeth Lloyd-Dolbey (1919–1994), personal secretary to the Sultan of Brunei Omar Ali Saifuddien III
- Franjo Malgaj (1894–1919), military hero
- Miloš Mikeln (1930–2014), author
- Anton Novačan (1887–1951), author, diplomat and politician
- Franc Ksaver Meško (1874–1864), author
- Aleš Pipan (b. 1959), basketball coach
- Maks Pleteršnik (1840–1923), linguist and philologian
- Bojan Prašnikar (b. 1953), football coach
- Tanja Ribič (b. 1968), actress and singer
- Jurij Sadar (b. 1962), architect
- Zmago Sagadin (b. 1952), basketball coach
- Lavoslav Schwentner (1865–1952), editor
- Mojmir Sepe (1930–2020), composer, conductor, arranger, trumpeter
- Blessed Anton Martin Slomšek (1800–1862), Roman Catholic bishop
- Katarina Srebotnik (b. 1981), tennis player
- Bojan Šrot (b. 1959), politician
- Beno Udrih (b. 1982), basketball player
- Bogumil Vošnjak (1882–1955), jurist, politician, diplomat, historian
- Josip Vošnjak (1834–1911), politician, physician and author
- Anton Aloys Wolf (1802–1871), Roman Catholic bishop of Ljubljana, lexicographer
- Marko Šuštaršič (1927–1976), painter

== Sources ==
- Article on Encyclopædia Britannica, referring to the 1895 Government Crisis
