= Drešinja Vas =

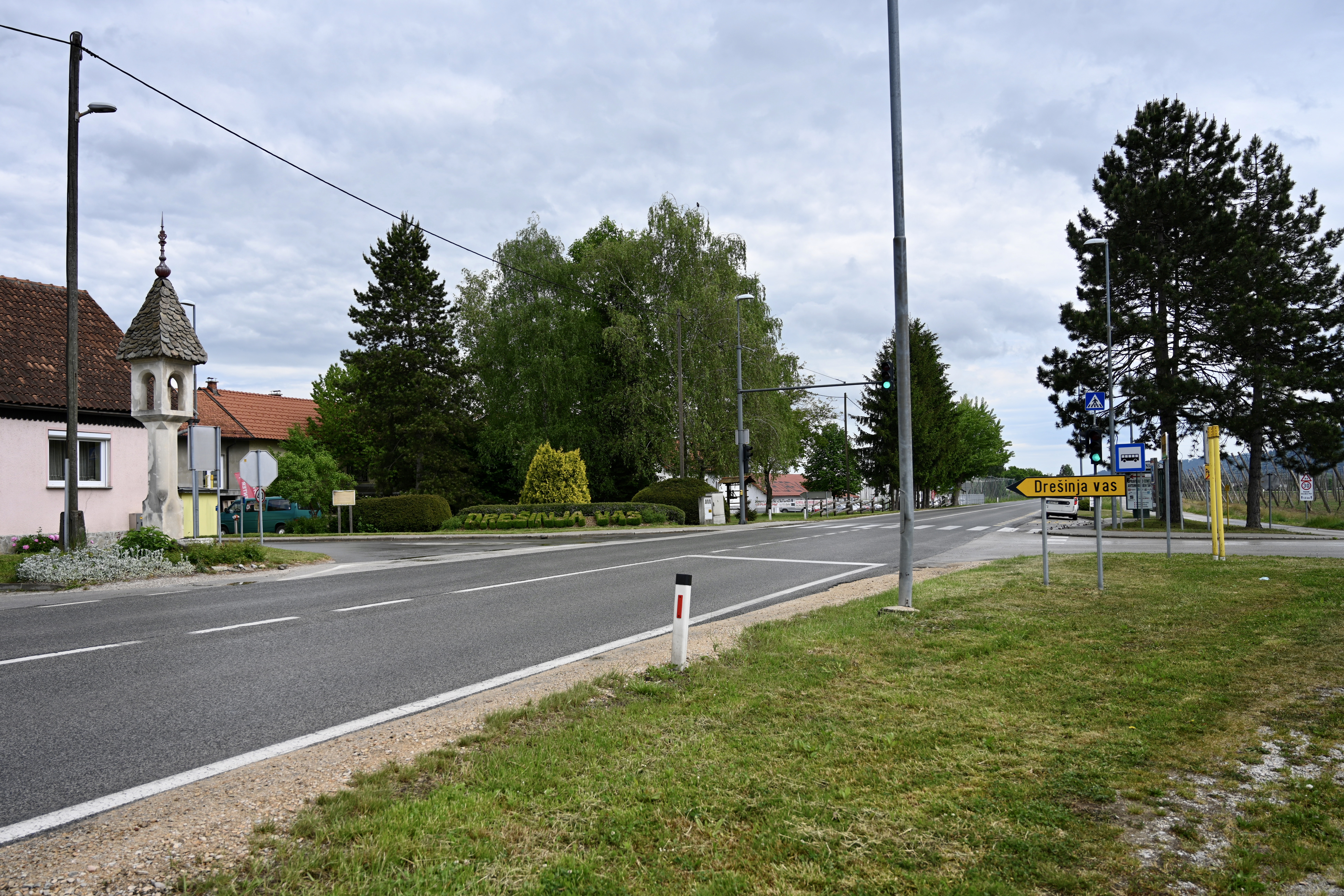

- Location in Slovenia
- Coordinates: 46°14′49.11″N 15°12′11.59″E
- Country: Slovenia
- Traditional region: Styria
- Statistical region: Savinja
- Municipality: Žalec

Area
  - Total: 2.03 km^{2} (0.78 sq mi)
- Elevation: 246.8 m (810 ft)

Population (2002)
  - Total: 263

Drešinja Vas (pronounced [dɾɛˈʃiːnja ˈʋaːs]; Slovene: Drešinja vas) is a settlement in the Municipality of Žalec in east-central Slovenia. It lies just north of the main regional road from Žalec to Celje. The area is part of the traditional region of Styria. The municipality is now included in the Savinja Statistical Region.

A small roadside chapel-shrine in the settlement dates to the last quarter of the 19th century.
