= Maks Pleteršnik =

Slovene lexicographer

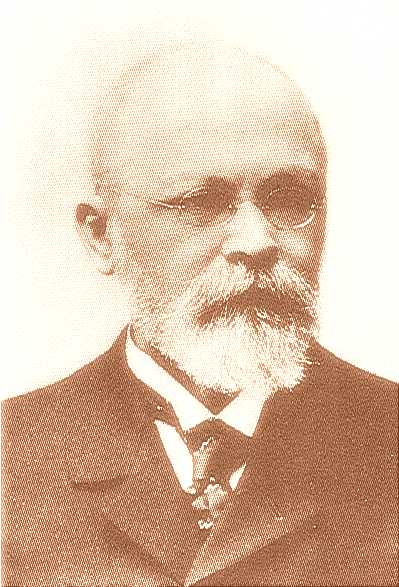
Maks Pleteršnik

Maks Pleteršnik (3 December 1840–13 September 1923) was a Slovene philologist, linguist, and lexicographer. Born in Pišece, he dedicated his life to the study and promotion of the Slovenian language and became the editor of an influential Slovene-German dictionary. Beyond his work in lexicography, Pleteršnik was an educator, translator, and participant in various Slovenian cultural and academic institutions. He died in his hometown of Pišece.

== Life ==
Pleteršnik was born in Pišece. His parents were Franc, a teacher, and Terezija Hriber. He had one brother and two sisters. After completing his primary education in Pišece, Pleteršnik attended the grammar school in Celje between 1851 and 1859. Thereafter, he studied classical philology under Bonitz and Slavic studies under Franc Miklošič in Vienna. During this period, Pleteršnik was introduced to the foundational principles of lexicography, assisting Miklošič with the corrections for the Lexicon palaeoslovenico-graeco-latinum, emendatum auctum ("Lexicon (dictionary) of Old Slovene with Greek and Latin, corrected and expanded") between 1862 and 1865. Pleteršnik concluded his studies in 1863, being examined in Latin, Greek, and Slovene for teaching in schools with German, Slovenian, or Serbo-Croatian as the language of instruction.

== Works ==
After graduating from high school, Pleteršnik was a substitute teacher at several grammar schools, teaching classical languages, German, and Slovene (at that time only as a subject) at grammar schools in Maribor (until September 1864) and later in Celje. In 1865, he received a decree for Kranj, but soon left for Gorizia, where he stayed for two years. He then taught in Trieste from 1867 to 1871, after which he went to Ljubljana, where he was employed full-time for the first time, and remained there until his retirement in 1900. After his retirement, he visited his homestead in Pišece a lot. For his 37 years of service as a professor, he was awarded the Knight's Cross of the Order of Franz Joseph.

He was also active as a translator (e.g. Farewell to Igor's Regiment (1866), California Tales (1876), and The Fate of Spion (1916)) and as a writer of various articles he wrote mainly treatises on ancient subjects, e.g. He also wrote papers on ancient subjects, including Comparatives in Homer and Serbian Folk Songs (1865 in German, 1873 in Slovene), Slavery among the Ancient Greeks (1877), Pericles (1877) and The First Days of the Second Triumvirate (1880)). In his youth, he supported Illyrianism, was particularly enthusiastic about Russian as a common Slavic language, which he discussed in his treatise Our Future (1868), and tried to arouse interest in Slavic studies among Slovene educators. Also important is his contribution on the Yugoslavs, i.e. Slovenes, Croats and Serbs, for the book Slavic World (1873), for which he also drew two maps in the appendix. In 1913, he retired from his original Illyrianism and confirmed the Slovene linguistic and national independence.

He participated in the creation of Wiesthaler's Latin-Slovene Dictionary, which was considered one of the greatest undertakings before the Dictionary of the Standard Slovene Language, but unfortunately it remained unfinished. Pleteršnik was always adding to it, and in 1925 the first book was published, while the rest remained in manuscript until the publication of the complete dictionary in 2007. He was also the co-author of the Latin-Slovene dictionary for the third and fourth grammar school classes, based on the Latin-German dictionary by J. A. Rozek (1882).

He was very involved in the activities of the Slovene Society (Slovenska matica). From 1871, he was in the section for publishing school books, from 1875 to 1876 he was also editor of the Society's Yearbook and participated in the preparation of the collection of place names), he was on the board of the Dramatic Society, and from 1899, he was a corresponding member of the Yugoslav Academy of Sciences and Arts in Zagreb.

== Slovene-German dictionary ==
Pleteršnik's dictionary is much more than a Slovene-German dictionary, it is the golden book of Slovene vocabulary and Slovene lexicography, the Slovene hallmark among Slavists at home and abroad.

— Metka Furlan, Slovene-German Dictionary (transliterated edition): Introduction

Maks Pleteršnik is particularly remembered in the Slovene linguistics as the final editor of the Slovensko-nemški slovar (Slovene-German Dictionary). This work stands as one of the most significant Slovenian lexicographic achievements, as it played a crucial role in consolidating the Slovenian language and providing insights into its vocabulary both past and present. The dictionary could even be termed an all-Slovenian lexicon because Pleteršnik incorporated lexical material from printed and manuscript sources across all Slovenian regions and literary traditions. Additionally, he integrated around 30 smaller yet extensive word collections. Due to its vast scope, the dictionary rightfully earned the title of a thesaurus during its era.

== Commemoration ==
In 1933, on the occasion of the 10th anniversary of Maks Pleteršnik's passing, the Slovenian Matica unveiled a memorial plaque at his house. Moreover, to commemorate the 150th anniversary of his birth, the locals of Pišece erected a pillar in his honor. Pleteršnik's childhood home underwent restoration in 1994, coinciding with a gathering of Slavists in Krško to mark the centenary of his dictionary, organized under the aegis of the Slovenian Slavic Association. The following year, Pišece hosted its inaugural symposium, which featured a round table discussion on lexicography. Since then, Pišece has regularly been the venue for academic gatherings and events in Pleteršnik's honor on 13 September, the anniversary of Pleteršnik's death. These symposia and the subsequent publications have been meticulously detailed by Katarina Novak in her 2013 diploma thesis titled "Pleteršnik's Slovene-German Dictionary."

The Maks Pleteršnik Primary School in Pišece is named after him. In addition to the Knight's Cross, he was also awarded the Order of St. Sava, 3rd degree. Three Pleteršnik streets are named after him, in Brežice, Celje, and Ljubljana.

A biographical novel about Pleteršnik, titled Maks Pleteršnik: A Week with a Lexicographer (Slovene: Maks Pleteršnik: Teden s slovaropiscem), was published by Rudi Mlinar in 2018 by the Celje Hermagoras Society. A year later, an audio recording of this novel was also published by the Association of the Blind and Visually Impaired of Slovenia.
