= Blatno (Louny District) =

- Municipality
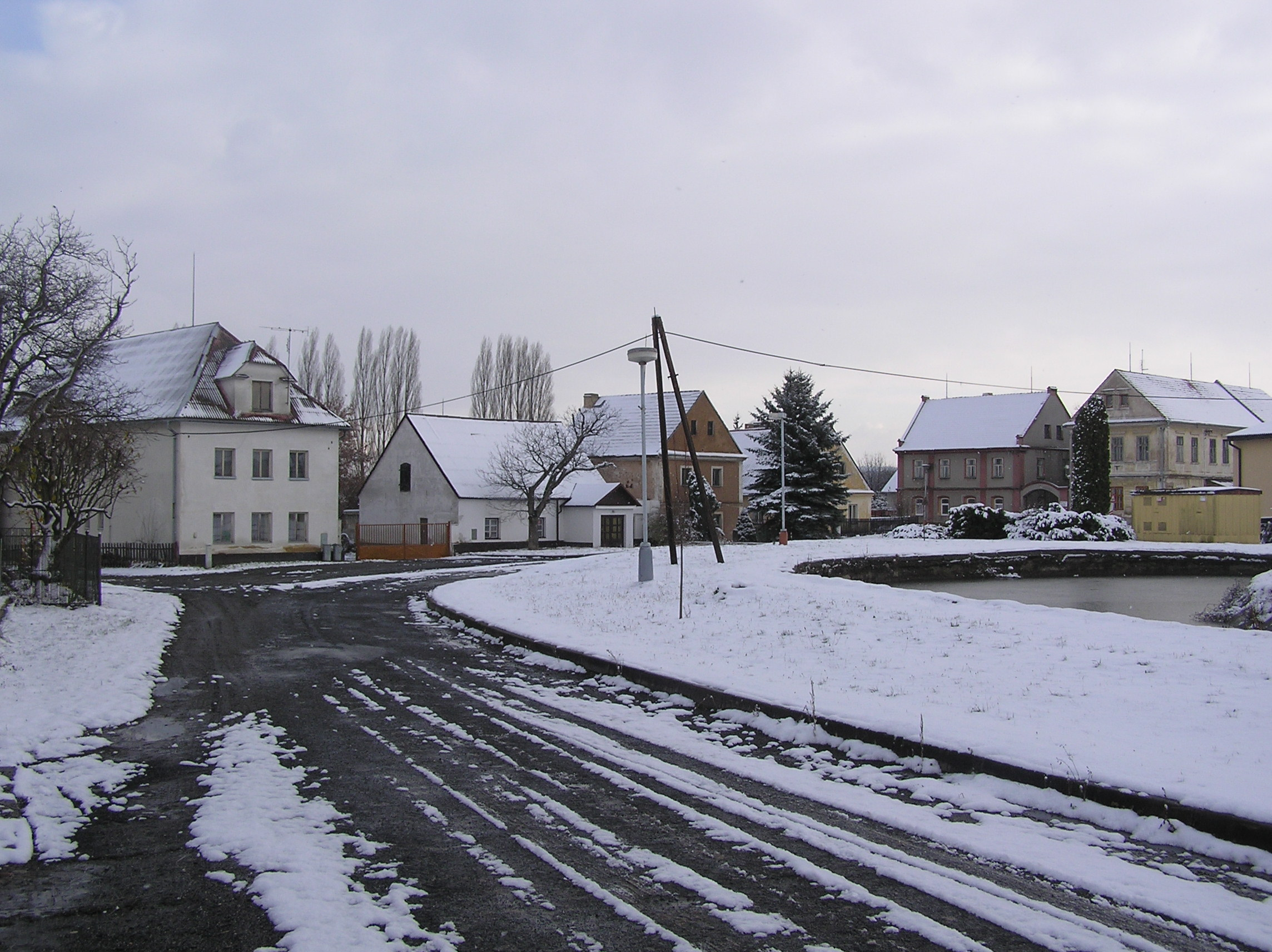
- Centre of Blatno

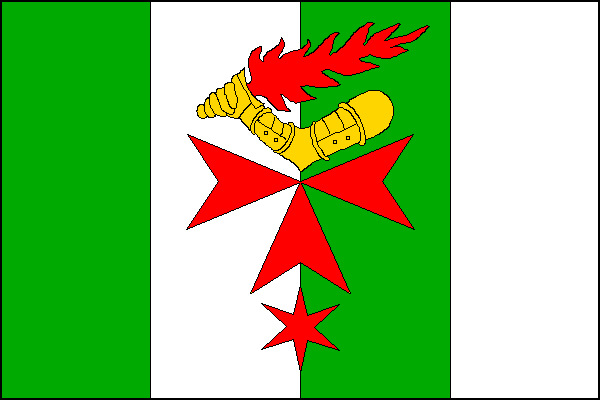
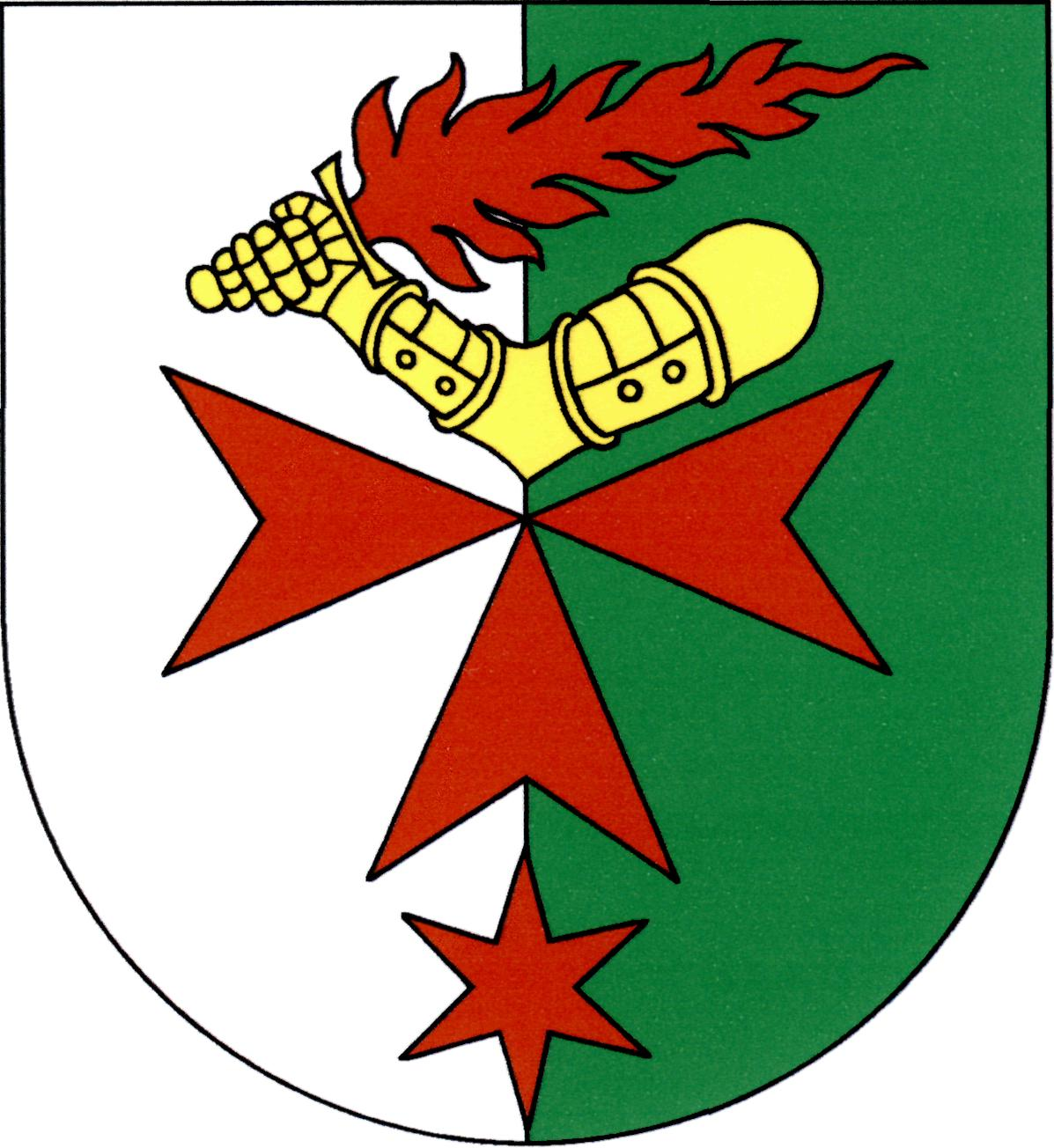
- Flag Coat of arms

- Location in the Czech Republic
- Coordinates: 50°5′49″N 13°23′23″E
- Country: Czech Republic
- Region: Ústí nad Labem
- District: Louny
- First mentioned: 1253

Area
  - Total: 22.35 km^{2} (8.63 sq mi)
- Elevation: 412 m (1,352 ft)

Population (2026-01-01)
  - Total: 508
  - Density: 22.7/km^{2} (58.9/sq mi)
- Time zone: UTC+1 (CET)
  - Summer (DST): UTC+2 (CEST)
- Postal codes: 439 84, 441 01
- Website: www.blatno-lounsko.cz

Blatno (German: Pladen) is a municipality and village in Louny District in the Ústí nad Labem Region of the Czech Republic. It has about 500 inhabitants.

Blatno lies approximately 41 kilometres (25 mi) south-west of Louny, 78 km (48 mi) south-west of Ústí nad Labem, and 74 km (46 mi) west of Prague.

== Administrative division ==
Blatno consists of two municipal parts (in brackets population according to the 2021 census):

- Blatno (396)
- Malměřice (82)

== Demographics ==
Historical population
Year	Pop.	±%
1869	508	—
1880	540	+6.3%
1890	559	+3.5%
1900	564	+0.9%
1910	586	+3.9%
1921	638	+8.9%
1930	800	+25.4%
1950	593	−25.9%
1961	642	+8.3%
1970	578	−10.0%
1980	592	+2.4%
1991	555	−6.2%
2001	553	−0.4%
2011	486	−12.1%
2021	478	−1.6%
Source: Censuses
