= Pišece =

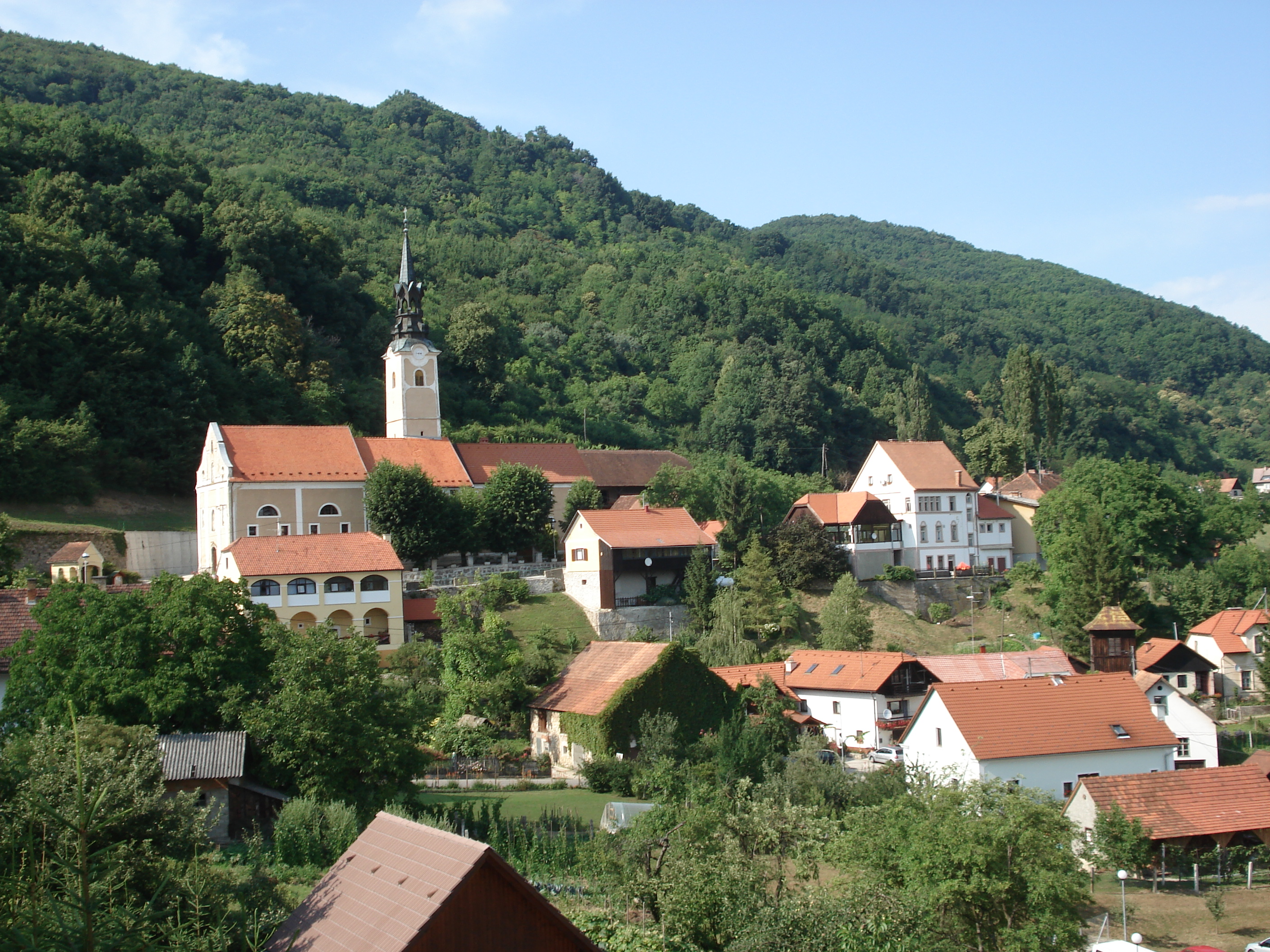

- Location in Slovenia
- Coordinates: 46°0′11.48″N 15°38′52.42″E
- Country: Slovenia
- Traditional region: Styria
- Statistical region: Lower Sava
- Municipality: Brežice

Area
  - Total: 4.24 km^{2} (1.64 sq mi)
- Elevation: 231.7 m (760 ft)

Population (2020)
  - Total: 335
  - Density: 79.0/km^{2} (205/sq mi)

Pišece (pronounced [piˈʃeːtsɛ], German: Pischätz) is a village in the hills west of Bizeljsko in the Municipality of Brežice in eastern Slovenia. The area is part of the traditional region of Styria. It is now included with the rest of the municipality in the Lower Sava Statistical Region. It includes the hamlets of Cerenje, Libreg (German: Liberg), Okrog, Orehovec, Orešje, Pečovje, Pilštanj (German: Peilenstein), Prekoše, Sveti Križ (German: Heiligenkreuz), and Vošni Dol (German: Aschenthal).

The local parish church is dedicated to Saint Michael and belongs to the Roman Catholic Diocese of Celje. It was first mentioned in written documents dating to 1406, but the current building dates to the late 18th century.

Pišece Castle is a medieval castle northwest of the main settlement. It was built in the 13th century with 16th-century additions. It was an important link in the defences against Ottoman raids in the 15th and 16th centuries.

== Notable people ==
Notable people that were born or lived in Pišece include:

- Milan Čopič (1925–1989), atomic physicist
- Alfred Moscon (1839–1927), politician
- Davorin Petančič (1910–1983), theater teacher and playwright
- Maks Pleteršnik (1840–1923), linguist and lexicographer
