= Slovene language =

South Slavic language

Slovene
- Slovenian
- slovenščina, slovenski jezik
- Pronunciation: [slɔˈʋèːnʃtʃina], [slɔˈʋèːnski ˈjɛ̀ːzik]
- Native to: Slovenia; Italy (Friuli-Venezia Giulia); Austria (Carinthia and Styria); Hungary (Vas County)
- Ethnicity: Slovenes
- Native speakers: 2.5 million (2010)
- Language family: Indo-European: Balto-Slavic; Slavic; South Slavic; Western South Slavic; Slovene
- Dialects: Prekmurje; Resian; approx. 48 unstandardised dialects
- Writing system: Latin (Slovene alphabet); Slovene Braille

Official status
- Official language in: Slovenia; European Union
- Recognised minority language in: Austria; Hungary; Italy
- Regulated by: Slovenian Academy of Sciences and Arts

Language codes
- ISO 639-1: sl
- ISO 639-2: slv
- ISO 639-3: slv
- Glottolog: slov1268
- Linguasphere: 53-AAA-f
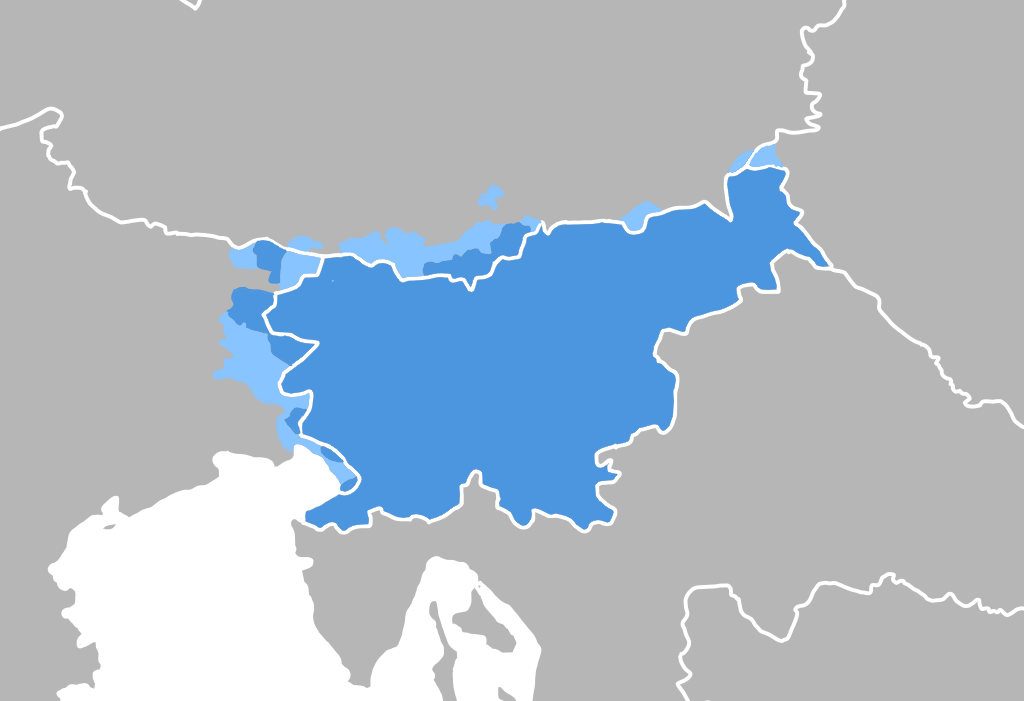
- Slovene-speaking areas

Slovene (/ˈsloʊviːn/ SLOH-veen or /sloʊˈviːn, slə-/ sloh-VEEN, slə-) or Slovenian (/sloʊˈviːniən, slə-/ sloh-VEE-nee-ən, slə-; (Note: Cf. Slovenia in Jones, Daniel (2003) [1917], Peter Roach; James Hartmann; Jane Setter (eds.), English Pronouncing Dictionary, Cambridge: Cambridge University Press, ISBN 3-12-539683-2) slovenščina [slɔˈʋèːnʃtʃina]) is a South Slavic language of the Balto-Slavic branch of the Indo-European language family. Most of its 2.5 million speakers are the inhabitants of Slovenia, the majority of them ethnic Slovenes. As Slovenia is part of the European Union, Slovene is also one of its 24 official and working languages. Its grammar is highly fusional, and it has a dual grammatical number, an archaic feature shared with some other Indo-European languages. Two accentual norms (one characterized by pitch accent) are used. Its flexible word order is often adjusted for emphasis or stylistic reasons, although basically it is an SVO language. It has a T–V distinction: the use of the V-form demonstrates a respectful attitude towards superiors and the elderly, while it can be sidestepped through passive form.

== Standard Slovene ==
Standard Slovene is the national standard language that was formed in the 18th and 19th centuries, based on the Upper and Lower Carniolan dialect groups, more specifically on the language of Ljubljana and adjacent areas. The Lower Carniolan dialect group was the dialect used in the 16th century by Primož Trubar for his writings, while he also used Slovene as spoken in Ljubljana, since he lived in the city for more than 20 years. It was the speech of Ljubljana that Trubar took as a foundation of what later became standard Slovene, with small addition of his native speech, the Lower Carniolan dialect. Trubar's choice was also later adopted by other Protestant writers in the 16th century, and ultimately led to the formation of a more standard language. The Upper dialect was also used by most authors during the language revival in the 18th and early 19th centuries, and was also the language spoken by France Prešeren, who, like most Slovene writers and poets, lived and worked in Ljubljana, where the speech was growing closer to the Upper Carniolan dialect group. Unstandardized dialects are better preserved in regions of the Slovene Lands where compulsory schooling was in languages other than Standard Slovene, as was the case with the Carinthian Slovenes in Austria, and the Slovene minority in Italy. For example, the Resian and Torre (Ter) dialects in the Italian Province of Udine differ most from other Slovene dialects.

== Classification ==
Slovene is an Indo-European language belonging to the Western subgroup of the South Slavic branch of the Slavic languages, together with Serbo-Croatian. It is close to the Chakavian and especially Kajkavian dialects of Serbo-Croatian, but genealogically more distant from the Shtokavian dialect, the basis for the Bosnian, Croatian, Montenegrin, and Serbian standard languages. Slovene in general, and Prekmurje Slovene in particular, shares the highest level of mutual intelligibility with transitional Kajkavian dialects of Hrvatsko Zagorje and Međimurje. Furthermore, Slovene shares certain linguistic characteristics with all South Slavic languages, including those of the Eastern subgroup, namely Bulgarian, Macedonian, and Torlakian dialects.

Mutual intelligibility with varieties of Serbo-Croatian is hindered by differences in vocabulary, grammar, and pronunciation, Kajkavian being firmly the most mutually intelligible. Slovene has some commonalities with the West Slavic languages that are not found in other South Slavic languages.

== History ==
=== Early history ===
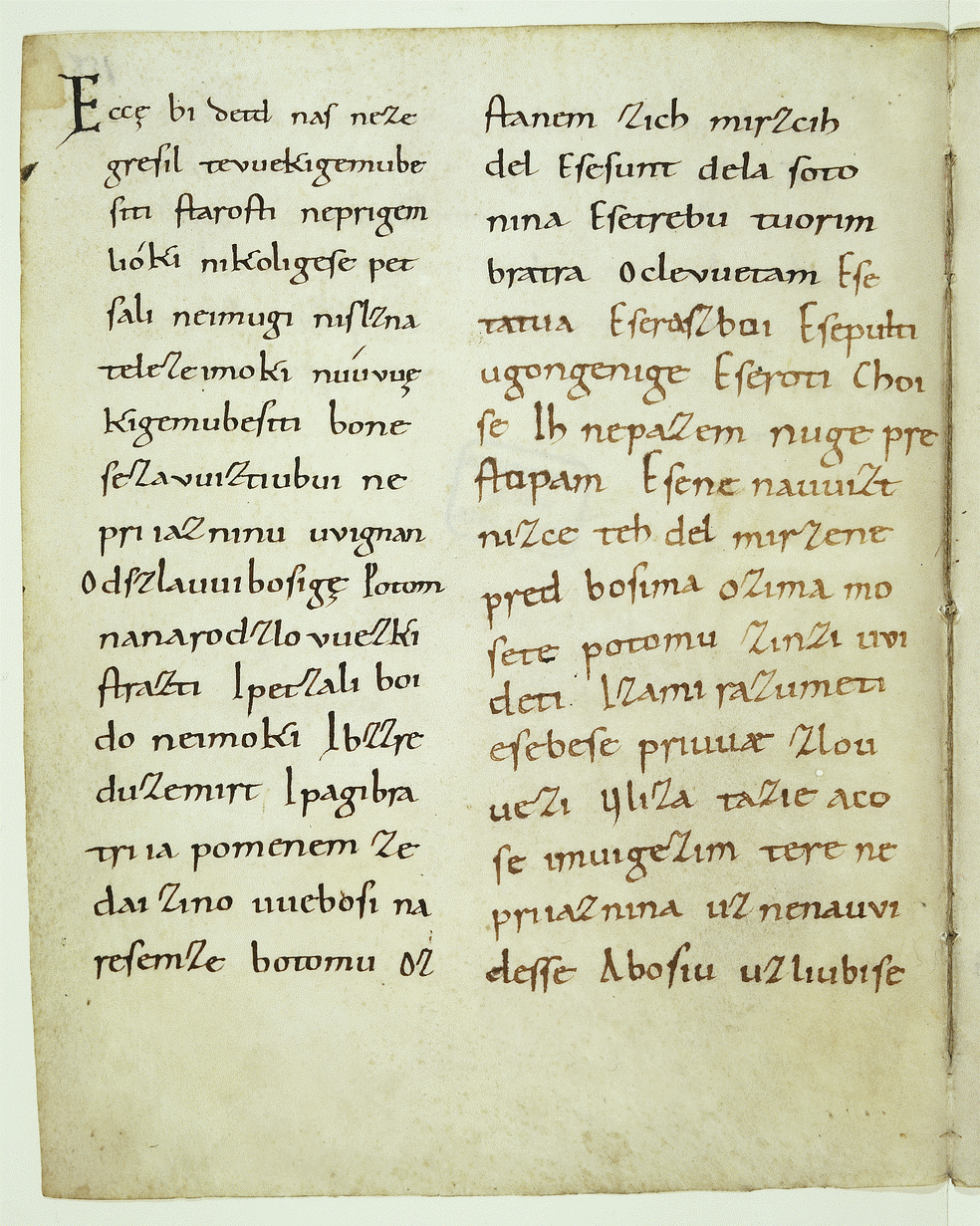
The Freising manuscripts, dating from the late 10th or the early 11th century, are considered the oldest documents in Slovene.

Like all Slavic languages, Slovene traces its roots to the same proto-Slavic group of languages that produced Old Church Slavonic. The earliest known examples of a distinct, written dialect connected to Slovene are from the Freising manuscripts, known in Slovene as Brižinski spomeniki. The consensus estimate of their date of origin is between 972 and 1039 CE (most likely before 1000). These religious writings are among the oldest surviving manuscripts in any Slavic language.

The Freising manuscripts are a record of a proto-Slovene that was spoken in a more scattered territory than modern Slovene, which included most of the present-day Austrian states of Carinthia and Styria, as well as East Tyrol, the Val Pusteria in South Tyrol, and some areas of Upper and Lower Austria.

Between the 9th and 12th century, proto-Slovene spread into northern Istria and in the areas around Trieste. By the 15th century, most of the northern areas were gradually Germanized: The northern border of the Slovene-speaking territory stabilized on the line going from north of Klagenfurt to south of Villach and east of Hermagor in Carinthia, while in Styria it was more or less identical with the current Austrian-Slovenian border. This linguistic border remained almost unchanged until the late 19th century, when a second process of Germanization took place, mostly in Carinthia.

During most of the Middle Ages, Slovene was a vernacular language of the peasantry, although it was also spoken in most of the towns on Slovenian territory, together with German or Italian. Although during this time German emerged as the spoken language of the nobility, Slovene had some role in the courtly life of the Carinthian, Carniolan, and Styrian nobility as well. This is proved by the survival of certain ritual formulas in Slovene (such as the ritual installation of the Dukes of Carinthia). The words Buge waz primi, gralva Venus! ('God be With You, Queen Venus!'), with which Bernhard von Spanheim greeted the poet Ulrich von Liechtenstein, who was travelling around Europe in guise of Venus, upon his arrival in Carinthia in 1227 (or 1238), is another example of some level of Slovene knowledge among high nobility in the region.

The first printed Slovene words, stara pravda (meaning 'old justice' or 'old laws'), appeared in 1515 in Vienna in a poem of the German mercenaries who suppressed the Slovene peasant revolt: the term was presented as the peasants' motto and battle cry. Standard Slovene emerged in the second half of the 16th century, thanks to the works of Slovene Lutheran authors, who were active during the Protestant Reformation. The most prominent authors from this period are Primož Trubar, who wrote the first books in Slovene; Adam Bohorič, the author of the first Slovene grammar; and Jurij Dalmatin, who translated the entire Bible into Slovene.

From the high Middle Ages up to the dissolution of the Austro-Hungarian Empire in 1918, in the territory of present-day Slovenia, German was the language of the elite, and Slovene was the language of the common people. During this period, German had a strong influence on Slovene; many Germanisms are preserved in contemporary colloquial Slovene. Many Slovene scientists before the 1920s also wrote in foreign languages, mostly German, which was the lingua franca of science throughout Central Europe at the time.

=== Recent history ===
During the rise of Romantic nationalism in the 19th century, the cultural movements of Illyrism and Pan-Slavism brought words from Serbo-Croatian, specifically Croatian dialects, and Czech into standard Slovene, mostly to replace words previously borrowed from German. Most of these innovations have remained, although some were dropped in later development. In the second half of the 19th century, many nationalist authors made an abundant use of Serbo-Croatian vocabulary but adapted it to Slovene orthography: among them were Fran Levstik and Josip Jurčič, who wrote the first novel in Slovene in 1866. This tendency was reversed in the Fin de siècle period by the first generation of modernist Slovene authors (most notably the writer Ivan Cankar), who resorted to a more purist and locally derived language without excessive Serbo-Croatian borrowings.

During the Kingdom of Yugoslavia in the 1920s and 1930s, the influence of Serbo-Croatian increased again. This was opposed by the younger generations of Slovene authors and intellectuals; among the fiercest opponents of an excessive Serbo-Croatian influence on Slovene were the intellectuals associated with the leftist journal Sodobnost, as well as some younger Catholic activists and authors. After 1945, numerous Serbo-Croatian words that had been used in the previous decades were dropped. The result was that a Slovene text from the 1910s is frequently closer to modern Slovene than a text from the 1920s and 1930s.

Between 1920 and 1941, the official language of the Kingdom of Yugoslavia was defined as "Serbo-Croato-Slovene", which was in practice merely Serbo-Croatian. In Slovenia, however, Slovene remained in use in education and administration. Many state institutions used only Serbo-Croatian, and a Slovene–Serbo-Croatian bilingualism was applied in many spheres of public life in Slovenia. For example, at post offices, on railways, and in administrative offices, Serbo-Croatian was used alongside Slovene. However, state employees were expected to be able to speak Slovene in Slovenia.

During the same time, western Slovenia (the Slovenian Littoral and the western districts of Inner Carniola) was under Italian administration and subjected to a violent policy of Fascist Italianization; the same policy was applied to Slovene speakers in Venetian Slovenia, Gorizia, and Trieste. Between 1923 and 1943, all public use of Slovene in these territories was strictly prohibited, and Slovene-language activists were persecuted by the state.

After the Carinthian Plebiscite of 1920, a less severe policy of Germanization took place in the Slovene-speaking areas of southern Carinthia which remained under Austrian administration. After the Anschluss of 1938, the use of Slovene was strictly forbidden in Carinthia as well. This accelerated a process of language shift in Carinthia, which continued throughout the second half of the 20th century: according to the Austro-Hungarian census of 1910, around 21% of inhabitants of Carinthia spoke Slovene in their daily communication; by 1951, this figure had dropped to less than 10%, and by 2001 to a mere 2.8%.

During World War II, Slovenia was divided among the Axis powers of Fascist Italy, Nazi Germany, and Hungary. Each of the occupying powers tried to either discourage or entirely suppress Slovene.

Following World War II, Slovenia became part of the Federal Yugoslavia. While there was no official language at federal level, Serbo-Croatian dominated as prestige dialect in all aspects whereas Slovene remained confined to now federal Slovenia where it was made an official language recognized once again. In the territory of Slovenia, it was commonly used in almost all areas of public life. One important exception was the Yugoslav army, where Serbo-Croatian was used exclusively, even in Slovenia.

National independence has further fortified the language: since 1991, when Slovenia gained independence, Slovene has been used as an official language in all areas of public life. In 2004, it became one of the official languages of the European Union upon the admission of Slovenia.

Nonetheless, the post-breakup influence of Serbo-Croatian on Slovene continued to a lesser extent, most prominently in slang in colloquial language.

Joža Mahnič, a literary historian and president of the publishing house Slovenska matica, said in February 2008 that Slovene is a language rich enough to express everything, including the most sophisticated and specialised texts. In February 2010, Janez Dular, a prominent Slovene linguist, commented that, although Slovene is not an endangered language, its scope has been shrinking, especially in science and higher education.

== Geographic distribution ==
The language is spoken by about 2.5 million people, mainly in Slovenia, but also by Slovene ethnolinguistic minorities in Friuli-Venezia Giulia, Italy (around 60,000 in Venetian Slovenia, Resia Valley, Canale Valley, Province of Trieste, and in those municipalities of the Province of Gorizia bordering Slovenia), in southern Carinthia, some parts of Styria in Austria (25,000), and in the western part of Croatian Istria bordering Slovenia. It is also spoken in Rijeka and Zagreb (11,800-13,100), in southwestern Hungary (3–4,000), in Serbia (5,000), and by the Slovene diaspora throughout Europe and the rest of the world (around 300,000), particularly in the United States (most notably Ohio, home to an estimated 3,400 speakers), Canada, Argentina, Australia, and South Africa.

== Dialects ==
A schematic map of Slovene dialects, based on the map by Tine Logar, Jakob Rigler, and other sources

Slovene is sometimes characterized as the most diverse Slavic language in terms of its dialects, with different degrees of mutual intelligibility. Accounts of the number of dialects range from as few as seven dialects, often considered dialect groups or dialect bases that are further subdivided into as many as 50 dialects. Other sources characterize the number of dialects as nine or eight. The Slovene proverb "Every village has its own voice" (Vsaka vas ima svoj glas) depicts the differences in dialects.

The Prekmurje dialect used to have a written norm of its own at one point. The Resian dialects have an independent written norm that is used by their regional state institutions. Speakers of those two dialects have considerable difficulties with being understood by speakers of other varieties of Slovene, needing to code-switch to Standard Slovene. Other dialects are mutually intelligible when speakers avoid the excessive usage of regionalisms.

Regionalisms are mostly limited to culinary and agricultural expressions, although there are many exceptions. Some loanwords have become so deeply rooted in the local language that people have considerable difficulties in finding a standard expression for the dialect term (for instance, kremšnita meaning a type of custard cake is kremna rezina in Standard Slovene, but the latter term is very rarely used in speech, being considered inappropriate for non-literary registers). Southwestern dialects incorporate many calques and loanwords from Italian, whereas eastern and northwestern dialects are replete with lexemes of German origin. Usage of such words hinders intelligibility between dialects and is greatly discouraged in formal situations.

== Phonology ==
Slovene has a phoneme set consisting of 21 consonants and 8 vowels.

=== Consonants ===
Slovene has 21 distinctive consonant phonemes.

Slovene consonant phonemes
		Labial	Dental/ Alveolar	Palatal	Velar
Nasal		m	n		
Plosive	voiceless	p	t		k
Plosive	voiced	b	d		ɡ
Affricate	voiceless		t͡s	t͡ʃ	
Affricate	voiced			d͡ʒ	
Fricative	voiceless	f	s	ʃ	x
Fricative	voiced		z	ʒ	
Approximant		ʋ	l	j	
Rhotic			r		

All voiced obstruents are devoiced at the end of words unless immediately followed by a word beginning with a vowel or a voiced consonant. In consonant clusters, the voicing distinction is neutralized and all consonants assimilate the voicing of the rightmost segment, i.e., the final consonant in the cluster. In this context, [v], [ɣ], and [d͡z] may occur as voiced allophones of /f/, /x/, and /t͡s/, respectively (e.g., vŕh drevésa [ʋrɣ dreˈʋesa]).

/ʋ/ has several allophones depending on context.

- Before a vowel, pronunciation is labiodental, [ʋ] (also described as [v]).
- After a vowel, pronunciation is bilabial [w] and forms a diphthong.
- At the beginning of a syllable, before a consonant (e.g., in vsi "all"), the pronunciation varies more widely by speaker and area. Many speakers convert /ʋ/ into a full vowel [u] in this position. For those speakers who retain a consonantal pronunciation, it is pronounced [w] before a voiced consonant and [ʍ] before a voiceless consonant. Thus, vsi may be pronounced as disyllabic [uˈsi] or monosyllabic [ʍsi].

The sequences /lj/, /nj/, and /rj/ occur only before a vowel. Before a consonant or word-finally, they are reduced to /l/, /n/, and /r/, respectively. This is reflected in the spelling in the case of /rj/, but not for /lj/ and /nj/.

Under certain (somewhat unpredictable) circumstances, /l/ at the end of a syllable may become [w], merging with the allophone of /ʋ/ in that position.

=== Vowels ===
Vowels of Slovene, from Šuštaršič, Komar & Petek (1999:137). /ɐ/ is not shown.

Slovene has an eight-vowel (or, according to Peter Jurgec, nine-vowel) system, in comparison to the five-vowel system of Serbo-Croatian.

Slovene vowels
	Front	Central	Back
Close	i		u
Close-mid	e	ə	o
Open-mid	ɛ	ə	ɔ
Near-open		(ɐ)	
Open		a	

== Grammar ==
=== Nouns ===
Slovene nouns retain six of the seven Slavic noun cases: nominative, accusative, genitive, dative, locative, and instrumental. There is no distinct vocative; the nominative is used in that role. Nouns, adjectives, and pronouns have three numbers: singular, dual, and plural.

Nouns in Slovene are either masculine, feminine, or neuter gender. In addition, there is a distinction between animate and inanimate nouns. This is only relevant for masculine nouns and only in the singular, at odds with some other Slavic languages, e.g., Russian, for which it is also relevant in the plural for all genders. Animate nouns have an accusative singular form that is identical to the genitive, while for inanimate nouns the accusative singular is the same as the nominative. Animacy is based mostly on semantics and is less rigid than gender. Generally speaking, a noun is animate if it refers to something that is generally thought to have free will or the ability to move of its own accord. This includes all nouns for people and animals. All other nouns are inanimate, including plants and other non-moving life forms, and also groups of people or animals. However, there are some nouns for inanimate objects that are generally animate, which mostly include inanimate objects that are named after people or animals. This includes:

- Dead people or animals
- Makes of cars
- Certain diseases (named after animals)
- Certain devices (named after animals or people)
- Works of art (named after their creator)
- Chess pieces and playing cards (named for the people they represent)
- Wines and mushrooms (named as demonyms)

=== Definiteness ===
There are no definite or indefinite articles as in English (the, a, an) or German (der, die, das, ein, eine). A noun is described without articles; the grammatical gender is shown by the ending of the word. It is enough to say barka ('a' or 'the barge'), Noetova barka ('Noah's ark'). The gender is known in this case to be feminine. In declensions, endings are normally changed; see below. If one would like to somehow distinguish between the definiteness or indefiniteness of a noun, one would say (prav/natanko/ravno) tista barka ('that/precise/exact barge') for 'the barge' and neka/ena barka ('some/a barge') for 'a barge'.

The definiteness of a noun phrase can also be discerned through the ending of the accompanying adjective. One should say rdeči šotor ('[exactly that] red tent') or rdeč šotor ('[a] red tent'). This difference is observable only for masculine nouns in nominative or accusative case. Because of the lack of article in Slovene and audibly insignificant difference between the masculine adjective forms, most dialects do not distinguish between definite and indefinite variants of the adjective, leading to hypercorrection when speakers try to use Standard Slovene.

=== T–V distinction ===
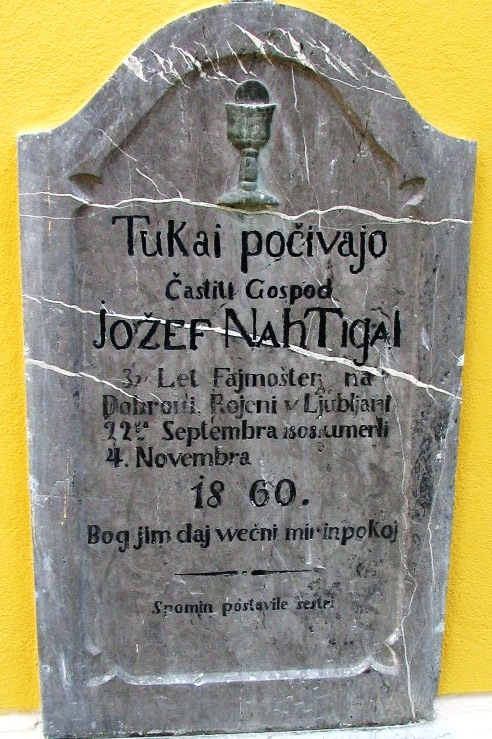
Tombstone of Jožef Nahtigal in Dobrova with archaic Slovene onikanje in indirect reference. Literal translation "Here lie [počivajo] the honorable Jožef Nahtigal ... they were born [rojeni] ... they died [umerli] ... God grant them [jim] eternal peace and rest."

Slovene, like most other European languages, has a T–V distinction, or two forms of 'you' for formal and informal situations. Although informal address using the 2nd person singular ti form (known as tikanje) is officially limited to friends and family, talk among children, and addressing animals, it is increasingly used among the middle generation to signal a relaxed attitude or lifestyle instead of its polite or formal counterpart using the 2nd person plural vi form (known as vikanje).

An additional nonstandard but widespread use of a singular participle combined with a plural auxiliary verb (known as polvikanje) signals a somewhat more friendly and less formal attitude while maintaining politeness:

- Vi ga niste videli. ('You did not see him': both the auxiliary verb niste and the participle videli are plural masculine. Standard usage.)
- Vi ga niste videl/videla. ('You did not see him': the auxiliary verb niste is plural but the participle videl/videla is singular masculine/feminine. Nonstandard usage.)

The use of nonstandard forms (polvikanje) might be frowned upon by many people and would not likely be used in a formal setting.

The use of the 3rd person plural oni ('they') form (known as onikanje in both direct address and indirect reference; this is similar to using Sie in German) as an ultra-polite form is now archaic or dialectal. It is associated with servant-master relationships in older literature, the child-parent relationship in certain conservative rural communities, and parishioner-priest relationships.

== Vocabulary ==
=== Foreign words ===
Foreign words used in Slovene are of various types depending on the assimilation they have undergone. The types are:

- sposojenka (loanword) – fully assimilated; e.g., pica ('pizza').
- tujka (foreign word) – partly assimilated, either in writing and syntax or in pronunciation; e.g., jazz, wiki.
- polcitatna beseda ali besedna zveza (half-quoted word or phrase) – partly assimilated, either in writing and syntax or in pronunciation; e.g., Shakespeare, but Shakespearja in genitive case.
- citatna beseda ali besedna zveza (quoted word or phrase) – kept as in original, although pronunciation may be altered to fit into speech flow; e.g., first lady in all cases.

The loanwords are mostly from German and Italian, while the more recently borrowed and less assimilated words are typically from English. Among the earliest borrowings in Slovene vocabulary are Romanisms, which began to enter the Slovene language with the settlement of Slovenia by the Slavs and continued during the Middle Ages. These are primarily toponyms: Latin Capris / Caprae → Koper, Latin Sontius → Soča. In addition, there are words such as jambor 'mast' < Latin arbor 'tree', golida 'milking pail' < Vulgar Latin galeda, hlače 'trousers' < Medieval Latin calcae, fant 'boy, lad' < Italian fante.

Slovene vocabulary also contains a large number of Germanisms, borrowed from the 8th to the 19th centuries: flinta 'rifle' < German Flinte, gmajna 'community, common land' < Middle High German gemeine, krompir 'potato' < German Grundbirne. Through German mediation, vocabulary of Latin and Greek origin also entered Slovene: klošter 'monastery', škrinja 'chest', špital 'hospital'.

== Writing system ==
This alphabet (abeceda) was derived in the mid-1840s from the system created by the Croatian linguist Ljudevit Gaj. Intended for the Serbo-Croatian language (in all its varieties), it was patterned on the Czech alphabet of the 1830s. Before that /s/ was, for example, written as ⟨ʃ⟩, ⟨ʃʃ⟩, or ⟨ſ⟩; /tʃ/ as ⟨tʃch⟩, ⟨cz⟩, ⟨tʃcz⟩, or ⟨tcz⟩; /i/ sometimes as ⟨y⟩; /j/ as ⟨y⟩; /l/ as ⟨ll⟩; /ʋ/ as ⟨w⟩; /ʒ/ as ⟨ʃ⟩, ⟨ʃʃ⟩, or ⟨ʃz⟩.

The standard Slovene orthography, employed in almost all situations, uses only the letters of the ISO basic Latin alphabet plus ⟨č⟩, ⟨š⟩, and ⟨ž⟩. The letters ⟨q⟩, ⟨w⟩, ⟨x⟩, and ⟨y⟩ are not included:

letter	phoneme	example word	word pronunciation
A a	/aː/ /a/	dan "day" abeceda "alphabet"	/ˈdáːn/, dȃn /abɛˈtséːda/, abecẹ̑da
B b	/b/	beseda "word"	/bɛˈséːda/, besẹ̑da
C c	/t͡s/	cvet "bloom"	/ˈtsʋéːt/, cvẹ̑t
Č č	/t͡ʃ/	časopis "newspaper"	/tʃasɔˈpíːs/, časopı̑s
D d	/d/	danes "today"	/ˈdàːnəs/, dánəs
E e	/eː/ /ɛː/ /ɛ/ /ə/	sedem "seven" reči "to say" medved "bear" sem "I am"	/ˈsèːdəm/, sẹ́dəm /ˈrɛ̀ːtʃi/, réči /ˈmɛ̀ːdʋɛt/, médved /ˈsə́m/, sə̏m
F f	/f/	fant "boy"	/ˈfánt/, fȁnt
G g	/ɡ/	grad "castle"	/ˈɡráːt/, grȃd
H h	/x/	hiša "house"	/ˈxìːʃa/, híša
I i	/iː/ /i/	biti "to be" imeti "to have"	/ˈbìːti/, bíti /iˈmèːti/, imẹ́ti
J j	/j/	jabolko "apple"	/ˈjàːbɔwkɔ/, jábołko
K k	/k/	kmet "peasant"	/ˈkmɛ́t/, kmȅt
L l	/l/ /uʷ/	letalo "airplane" zrel "mature"	/lɛˈtàːlɔ/, letálo /ˈzrɛ́uʷ/, zrȅł
M m	/m/	misliti "to think"	/ˈmìːsliti/, mísliti
N n	/n/	novice "news"	/nɔˈʋìːtsɛ/, novíce
O o	/oː/ /ɔː/ /ɔ/	opica "monkey" okno "window" gospa "lady"	/ˈóːpitsa/, ọ̑pica /ˈɔ̀ːknɔ/, ókno /ɡɔˈspàː/, gospá
P p	/p/	pomoč "help"	/pɔˈmóːtʃ/, pomọ̑č
R r	/r/ /ər/	riž "rice" trg "square"	/ˈríːʃ/, rȋž /ˈtə́rk/, tȓg
S s	/s/	svet "world"	/ˈsʋéːt/, svẹ̑t
Š š	/ʃ/	šola "school"	/ˈʃóːla/, šọ̑la
T t	/t/	tip "type"	/ˈtíːp/, tȋp
U u	/uː/ /u/	ulica "street" mamut "mammoth"	/ˈùːlitsa/, úlica /ˈmáːmut/, mȃmut
V v	/ʋ/ /ʍ/ /w/ /uʷ/	voda "water" vsebina "content" vzeti "take" lev "lion"	/ˈʋɔ̀ːda/, vóda /ʍsɛˈbiːna/ /ˈwzéːti/ /ˈlɛ́uʷ/, lȅv
Z z	/z/	zima "winter"	/ˈzìːma/, zíma
Ž ž	/ʒ/	življenje "life"	/ʒiwˈljɛ̀ːnjɛ/, življénje

The orthography thus underdifferentiates several phonemic distinctions:

- Stress, vowel length and tone are not distinguished, except with optional diacritics when it is necessary to distinguish between similar words with a different meaning.
- The two distinct mid-vowels are also not distinguished, both written as simply ⟨e⟩ and ⟨o⟩.
- The schwa /ə/ is also written as ⟨e⟩. However, the combination /ər/ is written as simply ⟨r⟩ between consonants and is thus distinguishable.
- Vocalized l /uʷ/ is written also as ⟨l⟩, but cannot be predictably distinguished from /l/ in that position.

In the tonemic varieties of Slovene, the ambiguity is even greater: ⟨e⟩ in a final syllable can stand for any of /éː/ /èː/ /ɛ́ː/ /ɛ̀ː/ /ɛ/ /ə/ (although /ɛ̀ː/ is rare; and Slovene, except in some dialects, does not distinguish tonemic accentuation).

The reader is expected to gather the interpretation of the word from the context, as in these examples:

- gol:
  - /ˈɡɔ́w/ gȍł "naked"
  - /ˈɡóːl/ gọ̑l "goal"
- jesen:
  - /ˈjɛ̀ːsɛn/ jésen "ash tree"
  - /jɛˈséːn/ jesẹ̑n "autumn"
- kot
  - /ˈkòːt/ kọ́t "angle"
  - /kɔt/ kot "as"
- med
  - /mɛt/ med "between"
  - /ˈméːt/ mẹ̑d "honey"
- pol
  - /ˈpóːl/ pọ̑l "pole"
  - /ˈpóːw/ pọ̑ł "half"
- precej
  - /ˈprɛ́tsɛj/ prȅcej "at once" (archaic)
  - /prɛˈtséːj/ precẹ̑j or /prɛˈtsɛ́j/ precȅj "a great deal (of)"

=== Diacritics ===
To compensate for the shortcomings of the standard orthography, Slovene also uses standardized diacritics or accent marks to denote stress, vowel length, and pitch accent, much like the closely related Serbo-Croatian. However, as in Serbo-Croatian, use of such accent marks is restricted to dictionaries, language textbooks, and linguistic publications. In normal writing, the diacritics are almost never used, except in a few minimal pairs where real ambiguity could arise.

Two different and mutually-incompatible systems of diacritics are used. The first is the simpler non-tonemic system, which can be applied to all Slovene dialects. It is more widely used and is the standard representation in dictionaries such as SSKJ. The tonemic system also includes tone as part of the representation. However, neither system reliably distinguishes schwa /ə/ from the front mid-vowels, nor vocalised l /w/ from regular l /l/. Some sources, such as Maks Pleteršnik's 1894/95 dictionary, write these as ə and ł, respectively, but this is not as common.

==== Non-tonemic diacritics ====
In the non-tonemic system, the distinction between the two mid-vowels is indicated, as well as the placement of stress and the length of vowels:

- Long stressed vowels are notated with an acute diacritic: ⟨á é í ó ú ŕ⟩ (IPA: /aː eː iː oː uː ər/).
- However, the rarer long stressed low-mid vowels /ɛː/ and /ɔː/ are notated with a circumflex: ⟨ê ô⟩.
- Short stressed vowels are notated with a grave: ⟨à è ì ò ù⟩ (IPA: /a ɛ i ɔ u/). Some systems may also include ⟨ə̀⟩ for /ə/.

==== Tonemic diacritics ====
The tonemic system uses the diacritics somewhat differently from the non-tonemic system. The high-mid vowels /eː/ and /oː/ are written ⟨ẹ ọ⟩ with a subscript dot, while the low-mid vowels /ɛː/ and /ɔː/ are written as plain ⟨e o⟩.

Pitch accent and vowel length is indicated by four diacritical marks:

- The acute ( ´ ) indicates long and low pitch: ⟨á é ẹ́ í ó ọ́ ú ŕ⟩ (IPA: /àː ɛ̀ː èː ìː ɔ̀ː òː ùː ə̀r/).
- The inverted breve ( ̑ ) indicates long and high pitch: ⟨ȃ ȇ ẹ̑ ȋ ȏ ọ̑ ȗ ȓ⟩ (IPA: /áː ɛ́ː éː íː ɔ́ː óː úː ə́r/).
- The grave ( ` ) indicates short and low pitch. This occurs only on ⟨è⟩ (IPA: /ə̀/), optionally written as ⟨ə̀⟩.
- The double grave ( ̏ ) indicates short and high pitch: ⟨ȁ ȅ ȉ ȍ ȕ⟩ (IPA: á ɛ́ í ɔ́ ú). ⟨ȅ⟩ is also used for /ə́/, optionally written as ⟨ə̏⟩.

The schwa vowel /ə/ is written ambiguously as ⟨e⟩, but its accentuation will sometimes distinguish it: a long vowel mark can never appear on a schwa, while a grave accent can appear only on a schwa. Thus, only ⟨ȅ⟩ and unstressed ⟨e⟩ are truly ambiguous.

== Regulation ==
Standard Slovene spelling and grammar are defined by the Orthographic Committee and the Fran Ramovš Institute of the Slovene Language, which are both part of the Slovenian Academy of Sciences and Arts (Slovenska akademija znanosti in umetnosti, SAZU). The newest reference book of standard Slovene spelling (and to some extent also grammar) is the Slovenski pravopis (SP2001; Slovene Normative Guide). The latest printed edition was published in 2001 (reprinted in 2003 with some corrections) and contains more than 130,000 dictionary entries. In 2003, an electronic version was published.

The official dictionary of modern Slovene, which was also prepared by SAZU, is Slovar slovenskega knjižnega jezika (SSKJ; Standard Slovene Dictionary). It was published in five volumes by Državna Založba Slovenije between 1970 and 1991 and contains more than 100,000 entries and subentries with accentuation, part-of-speech labels, common collocations, and various qualifiers. In the 1990s, an electronic version of the dictionary was published and is available online.

The SAZU considers SP2001 to be the normative source on Slovene. When dictionary entries in SP2001 and SSKJ differ, the SP2001 entry takes precedence. SP2001 is called a Spelling Dictionary by the European Network of e-Lexicography.

== Sample text ==
Article 1 of the Universal Declaration of Human Rights in Slovene and English.

Slovene: Vsi ljudje se rodijo svobodni ter imajo enako dostojanstvo in pravice. Dana sta jim razum in vest, in bi morali drug z drugim ravnati v duhu bratstva.

English: All human beings are born free and equal in dignity and rights. They are endowed with reason and conscience and should act towards one another in a spirit of brotherhood.

== Bibliography ==
- Greenberg, Marc L. (2006), A Short Reference Grammar of Standard Slovene, Kansas: University of Kansas
- Herrity, Peter (2000), Slovene: A Comprehensive Grammar, London: Routledge, ISBN 0-415-23148-5
- Jurgec, Peter (2005), "Formant frequencies of standard Slovene vowels", Govor, 22 (2): 127–144
- Jurgec, Peter (2007), "Schwa in Slovenian is Epenthetic", ResearchGate
- Šolar, Jakob (1950), Slovenski pravopis (in Slovenian), Ljubljana: Državna založba Slovenije
- Šuštaršič, Rastislav; Komar, Smiljana; Petek, Bojan (1999), "Slovene", Handbook of the International Phonetic Association: A guide to the use of the International Phonetic Alphabet, Cambridge: Cambridge University Press, pp. 135–139, doi:10.1017/S0025100300004874, ISBN 0-521-65236-7, S2CID 249404451
- Toporišič, Jože (2001), Slovenski pravopis, Ljubljana: SAZU, archived from the original on 14 August 2018
