= World War II in the Slovene Lands =

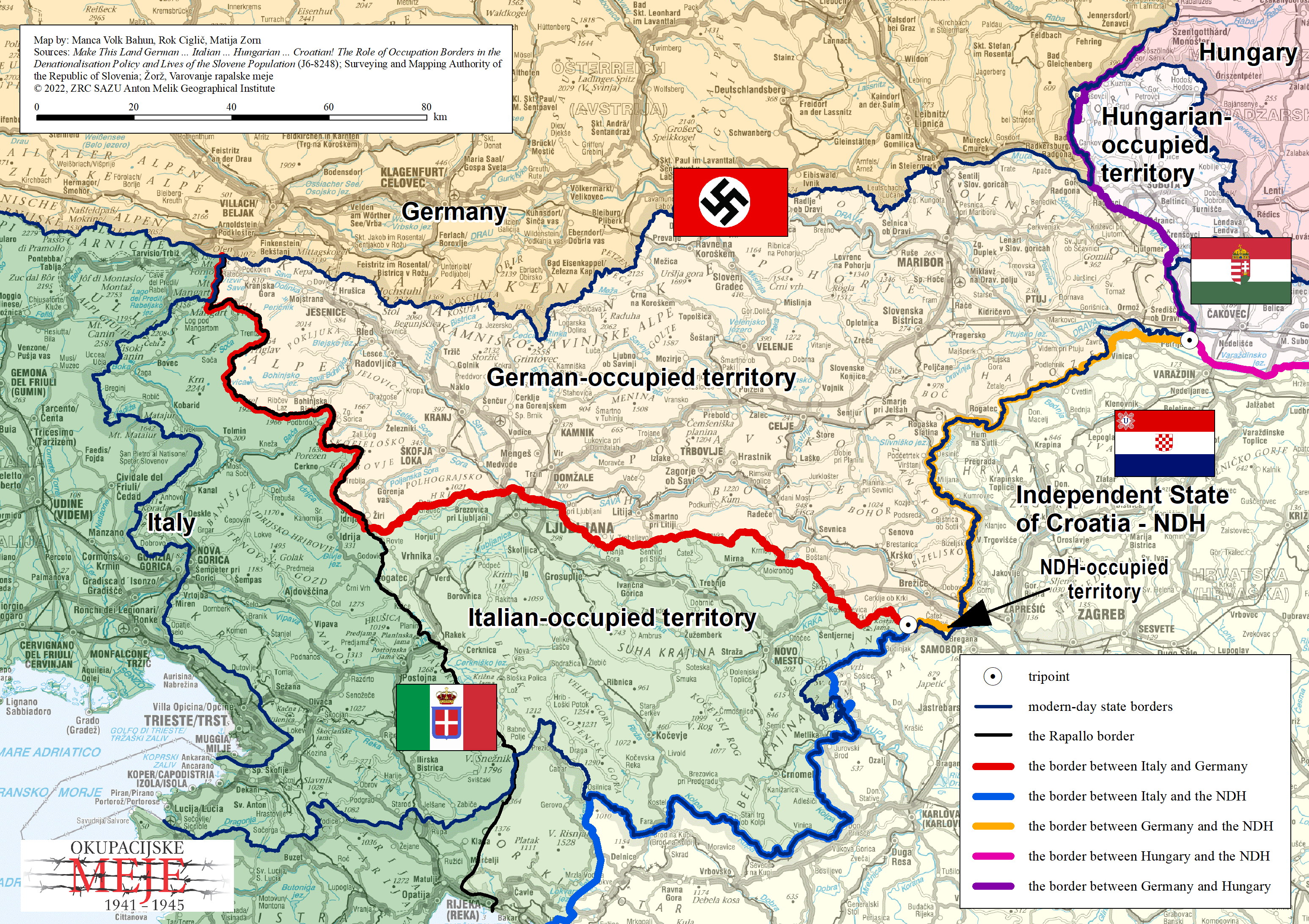
Border lines and occupied territories

World War II in the Slovene Lands started in April 1941 and continued until May 1945. The Slovene Lands were in a unique situation. In addition to getting trisected, Drava Banovina (roughly today's Slovenia) was the only part that experienced a further step—absorption and annexation into neighboring Nazi Germany, Fascist Italy, and Hungary. Slovene-settled territory was divided largely between Nazi Germany and Fascist Italy, with smaller territories occupied and annexed by Hungary and Croatia.

== History ==
=== Occupation, resistance, collaboration, civil war, and post-war killings ===
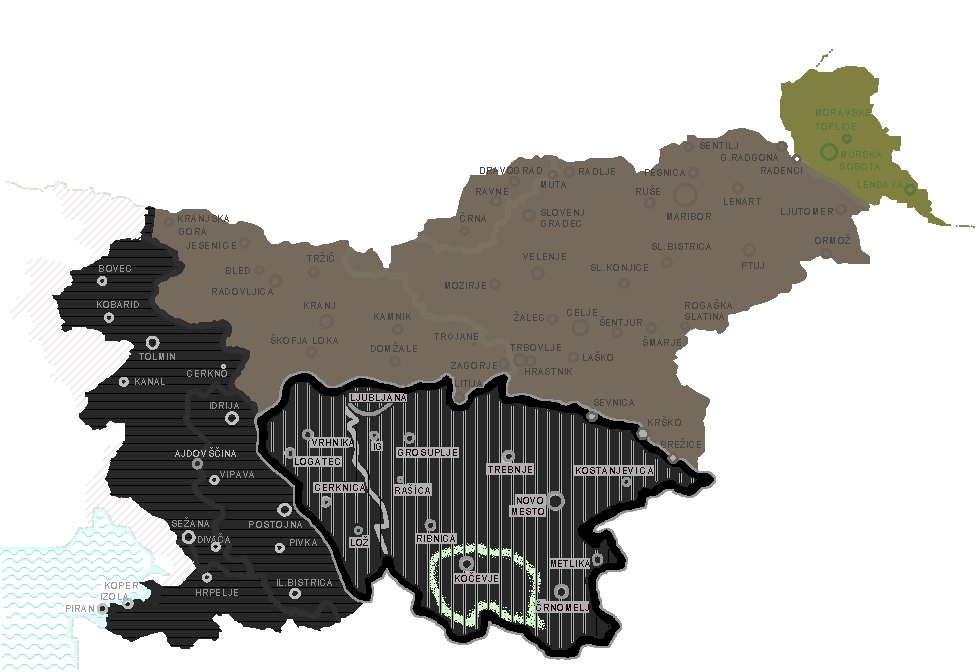
During World War II, Nazi Germany and Hungary annexed northern areas (brown and dark green areas, respectively), while Fascist Italy annexed the vertically hashed black area (the solid black western part had been annexed by Italy already with the Treaty of Rapallo). Some villages were incorporated into the Independent State of Croatia. After 1943, Germany took over the Italian occupational area as well.

On 6 April 1941, Germany invaded Yugoslavia. Resistance by the Kingdom of Yugoslavia's army was insignificant. Slovene-settled territory was occupied. Germany initially bombed Belgrade, killing 20,000 people. On April 10, German troops reached Zagreb and on April 12 they entered Belgrade. The German army then entered from Bulgaria. Its mobilized units prevented the withdrawal of the Yugoslav army into the Thessaloniki front.

On 11 April, Fascist Italy and Hungary invaded, occupying further territory. The Italian army split in two: it penetrated the part towards both Ljubljana and beyond via Kočevje, and the second part penetrated via Dalmatia.

The Germans occupied the Upper Carniola, the Lower Styria, the northwestern part of Prekmurje and the northern part of the Lower Carniola. The Italians occupied the Inner Carniola, the majority of the Lower Carniola and Ljubljana, whereas the Hungarians occupied the major part of Prekmurje, with approximately 320,000 inhabitants. Italy established the Province of Ljubljana (Italian Provincia di Lubiana).

On the first day of the invasion, Slovene political parties, with the exception of the Communists, established a Slovene National Council, announcing over Radio Ljubljana on 11 April that it was the sole sovereign authority representing the Slovene nation. The Council surrendered to the Italian army the following day when Italian forces entered Ljubljana. Shortly after the attack, the National People's Council was formed under the leadership of Marko Natlačen, who called for a peaceful handover of weapons and expulsion of the occupiers.

In 2005, Slovene authors first published information about six villages in Lower Carniola that were annexed by the Independent State of Croatia. A Maribor-based historian first published original research about it in 2011, but it remains unclear why villages from Drava Banovina were occupied contrary to a German–Croatian treaty.

Five Slovene settlements were established under the authority of the Independent State of Croatia (NDH): Bregansko selo (now called Slovenska vas), Nova vas near Bregana (now Nova vas near Mokrice), Jesenice in Dolenjska, Obrežje and Čedem. The territory was about 20 square kilometers, with about 800 inhabitants at that time.

==== Under the Nazi occupation ====
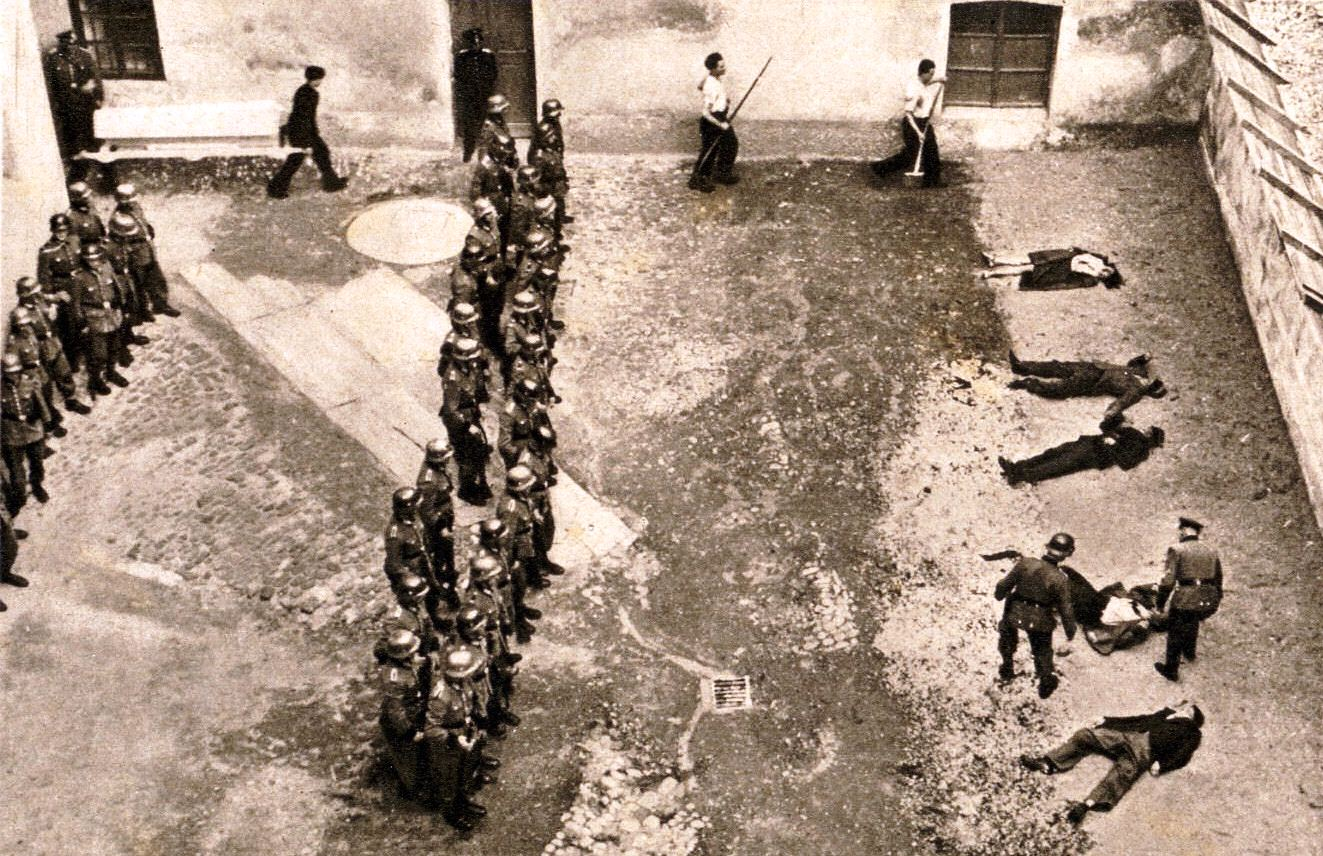
Germans executing Slovene hostages in Celje, July 22, 1941

The Germans planned for the forced location of the Slovene population in the so-called Rann Triangle, around the area of the southeastern Slovenian town Brežice, near the border with the Italians. The rest of the Slovene population in Lower Styria was seen as Wends, to be assimilated. Nationalists and people who moved from other parts of Yugoslavia after 1919 were expelled to the puppet states of Nedić's Serbia and NDH. Because Hitler opposed having ethnic German Gottscheers in the Italian occupation zone, they were moved and would form an ethnic barrier to other Slovene lands. About 46,000 Slovenes were transported to Saxony in Germany in order to make space for the relocated Gottscheers. Around 30,000 to 40,000 Slovene men were conscripted into the Wehrmacht and sent to the Eastern front. Slovene was banned in schools, and its use in public life was curbed.

The majority of Slovene victims during the war were from northern Slovenia, i.e. Lower Styria, Upper Carniola, Central Sava Valley, and Slovenian Carinthia. However, their formal annexation to Germany was postponed because of the installation of the new "Gauleiter" and "Reichsstatthalter" of Carinthia first. The Nazis dropped the plan because of the Slovene Partisans, with which they wanted to deal first. Only Meža valley initially became part of Reichsgau Carinthia. They later joined the Yugoslav Partisans led by Josip Broz Tito.

==== Nazi persecution of the Church ====
The Nazi religious persecution of the Catholic Church in Slovenia was akin to that which occurred in the annexed regions of Poland. Within six weeks of the Nazi occupation, only 100 of the 831 priests in the Diocese of Maribor and part of the Diocese of Ljubljana remained free. Clergy were persecuted and sent to concentration camps, and religious orders had their properties seized.

==== Under Fascist Italy's occupation ====
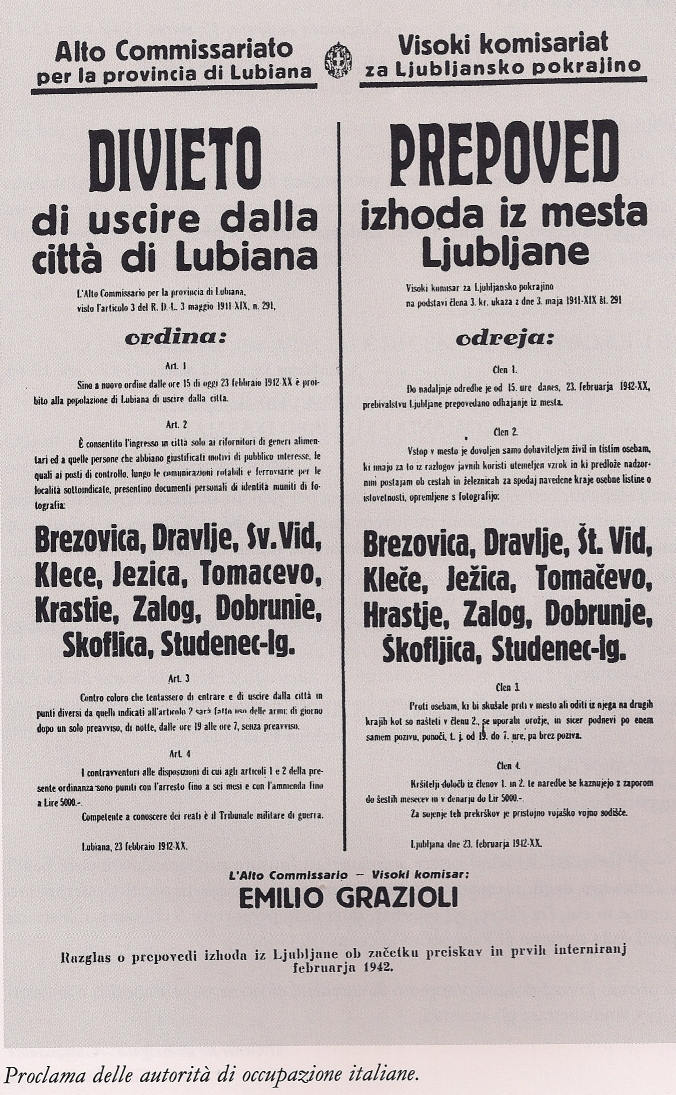
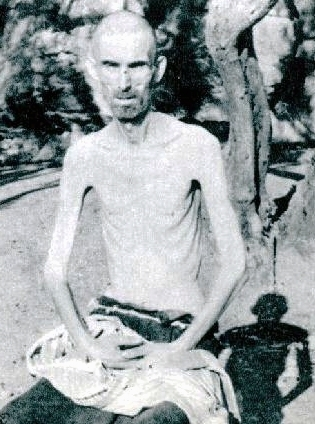
1) Italian poster forbidding exit from Ljubljana, surrounded by barbed wire 2) an inmate in the Italian Rab concentration camp

Compared to German policies and the forced Fascist italianization in the former Austrian Littoral annexed after the First World War, the initial Italian policy was not as violent. Tens of thousands of Slovenes from German-occupied Lower Styria and Upper Carniola escaped to the Province of Ljubljana until June 1941. Italian was introduced into schools only as a teaching subject. Non-political, cultural and sports associations were allowed.

=== Resistance ===
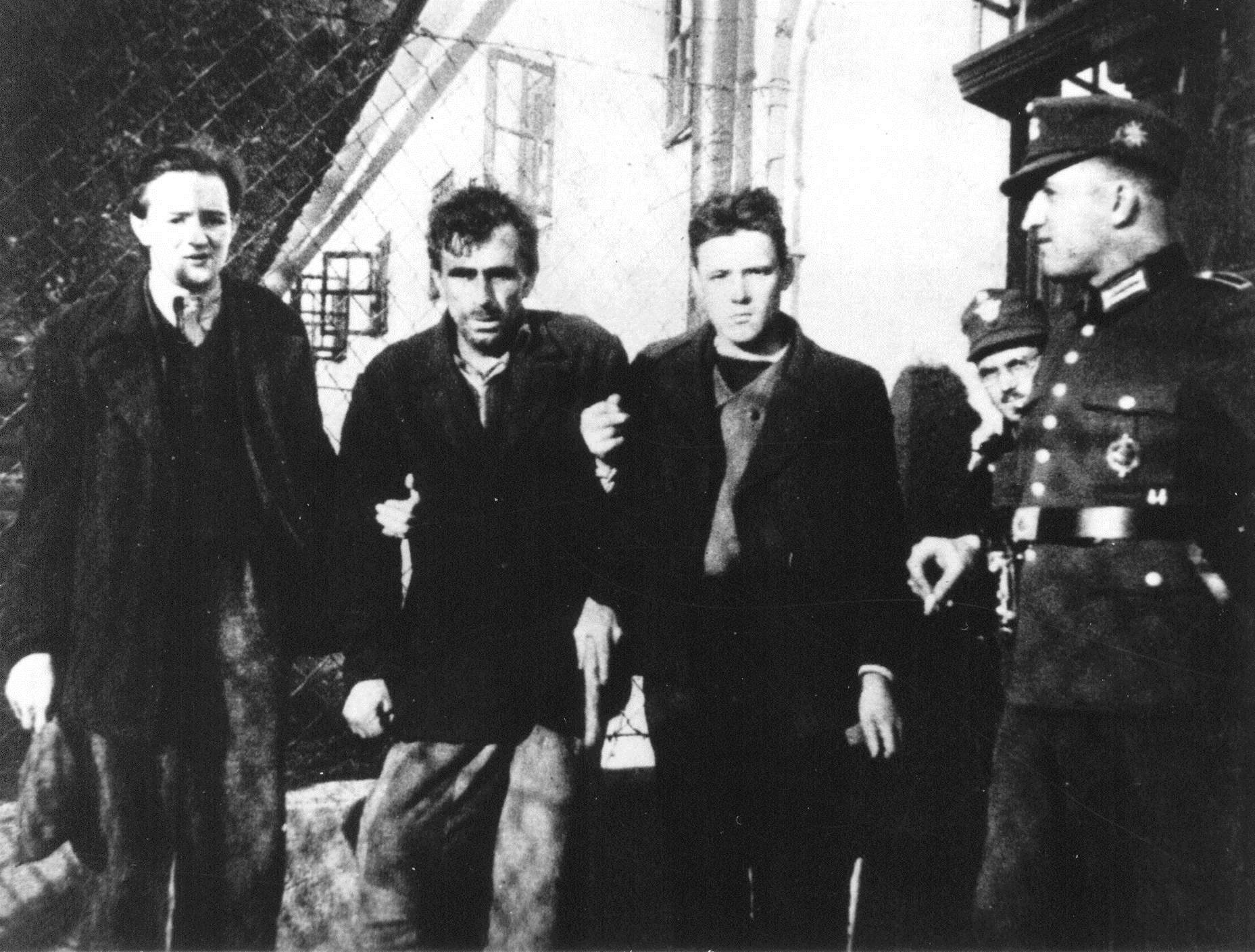
Prisoners in Begunje na Gorenjskem, 1941

Resistance started in Ljubljana, On 26 April 1941, several groups formed the Liberation Front of the Slovene Nation, which was the leading resistance force. The front was initially a democratic platform. The founding groups were: the Communist Party of Slovenia, some Christian Socialists, the democratic faction of the Liberal Gymnastical Society Sokol and unaffiliated cultural workers. In Maribor, on April 29, 1941, two resisters burned two personal cars of the German Civil Administration. This was the first anti-occupation incident. Nazi police arrested and then released about 60 young men. On June 22, 1941, the main command of the Partisan forces was established and on the same day, the Secrets of the Liberation Movement OF were published. On November 1, the Basic Points of the OF, were published. By the signing of the Dolomite Declaration on March 1, 1943, the leading role in the Liberation Front was taken by the Communist Party of Slovenia.

Thereafter, Italian violence against the civil population easily matched that of the Germans. 25,000 people were deported — 7.5% of the population — in one of the most drastic operations in Europe. They filled many Italian concentration camps, such as Rab concentration camp, in Gonars concentration camp, Monigo (Treviso), Renicci d'Anghiari, Chiesanuova and elsewhere. In 1942 and 1943, about 3500 men, women and children died of hunger and disease. To suppress mounting resistance by Slovene Partisans, Mario Roatta adopted summary executions, hostage-taking, reprisals, internments, and torched houses and whole villages. Italy's "3C" pamphlet signed by General Mario Roatta on March 1, 1942, was tantamount to a declaration of war on civilians. A barbed wire fence—now the Trail of Remembrance and Comradeship—surrounded Ljubljana to prevent communication between underground activists in Ljubljana and the larger group of partisans in the countryside.

With the Dolomiti Declaration, signed in March 1943, the Communists dominated the resistance. A liberated territory was formed in Kočevje, where the OF organized the Kočevski Choir, the highest body of the Slovenian state. It adopted a decision join Primorska Slovenia.

After the Italian armistice of September 1943, the Germans took over the province of Ljubljana and the Slovenian Littoral, incorporating them into their Operation Zone of Adriatic Coastal Region. They united the Slovene anti-Communist counter-insurgence into the Slovene Home Guard and appointed a puppet regime . The resistance expanded, creating its own administrative structures as the basis for Slovene statehood.

At the end of the war, the Slovene Partisan army, together with the Yugoslav Army and the Soviet Red Army, freed the entire Slovenian ethnic territory. The VOS departments under the command of the Communist Party and the Soviet model, after the end of the war, mostly performed post-war extrajudicial killings against civilian and military personnel. Up to 600 graves have been evacuated so far throughout Slovenia.

It broadcast its own radio program called Kričač, never suppressed by occupying forces, leading them to confiscate antennas from the local population.

Its military arm was the Slovene Partisans. The Slovene Partisans retained their specific organizational structure and Slovene language as their commanding language until the last months, when their language was removed as the commanding language. In March 1945, the Slovene Partisan Units were officially merged into the Yugoslav Army.

At the very beginning, Slovene Partisan forces were relatively small, poorly armed and without any infrastructure, but Spanish Civil War veterans amongst them had some experience with guerrilla methods of fighting the enemy. The partisan activities in the Slovene Lands were initially independent of Tito's Partisans in the south. In autumn 1942, Tito attempted for the first time to control the Slovene resistance movement. The merger of the Slovene Partisans with Tito's forces happened in 1944.

In December 1943, Franja Partisan Hospital was built in difficult and rugged terrain, deep inside German-occupied Europe, only a few hours from Austria and the central parts of the Third Reich. German military activity was frequent in the general region throughout the operation of the hospital. It saw continuous improvements until May 1945.

==== Civil war and post-war killings ====
In the summer of 1942, a civil war between Slovenes broke out. The two fighting factions were the Slovenian Partisans and the Italian-sponsored anti-communist militia, nicknamed by communists the "White Guard", later re-organized under Nazi command as the Slovene Home Guard. Small units of Slovenian Chetniks also existed in Lower Carniola and Styria. The Partisans were under the command of the Liberation Front (OF) and Tito's Yugoslav resistance, while the Slovenian Covenant served as the political arm of the anti-Communist militia. The civil war was mostly restricted to the Province of Ljubljana, where more than 80% of the Slovene anti-partisan units were active. Between 1943–1945, smaller anti-Communist militia existed in parts of the Slovenian Littoral and in Upper Carniola, while they were virtually non-existent in the rest of the country. By 1945, the total number of Slovene anti-Communist militiamen reached 17,500.

Immediately after the war, some 12,000 members of the Slovene Home Guard were killed in the Kočevski Rog massacres, while thousands of anti-communist civilians were killed in the first year after the war. These massacres were silenced, and remained a taboo topic until an interview with Edvard Kocbek was published by Boris Pahor in his publication Zaliv, causing the 1975 Zaliv Scandal in Tito's Yugoslavia.

==== End of war and aftermath ====
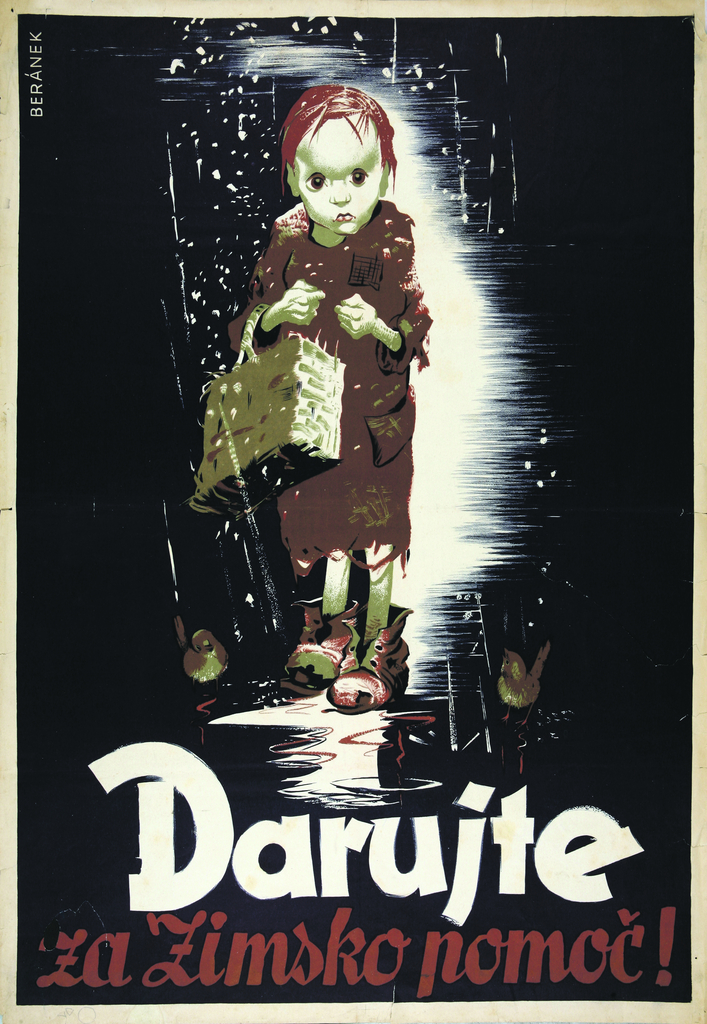
WW2 poster from Slovenia: "Donate for the Winter Aid!"

World War II in the Slovene Lands lasted until the middle of May 1945. On 3 May, the National State of Slovenia was proclaimed as part of the Kingdom of Yugoslavia. The liberation of Ljubljana was announced on 9 May 1945. The last battle was the Battle of Poljana, which took place near Prevalje on 14 and 15 May 1945. Hundreds of ethnic Italians from the Julian March were killed by the Yugoslav Army and partisan forces in the Foibe massacres; some 27,000 Istrian Italians fled Slovenian Istria from Communist persecution in the Istrian–Dalmatian exodus. The German-speaking minority, 2.5% of the Slovenian population prior to the war, was either expelled or killed

Approximately 8% of the Slovene population died. The small Jewish community, mostly in the Prekmurje region, was destroyed in 1944 in the holocaust of Hungarian Jews.

== Croatian occupation of Slovenian territories ==
After the Invasion of Yugoslavia Slovene lands were divided between Nazi Germany, Italy and Hungary. Some smaller parts were also occupied by Independent State of Croatia. In 1941, five Slovenian settlements came under Croatian rule: Bregansko selo (today it is called Slovenska vas), Nova vas pri Bregani (today Nova vas pri Mokricah), Jesenice na Dolenjskem, Obrežje and Čedem. It was a territory of approximately 20 square kilometers in which around 800 inhabitants lived at the time. Slovenian children from the occupied villages had to go to the Croatian school in Lug pri Bregani. Immediately after the start of the partisan resistance in 1942, the Ustaše authorities began to carry out mass arrests among the population. In doing so, they had a particularly rough time with the Slovenian population. On September 14, 1942, the Croatian Ustaše killed all the men from the Slovenian Planina in revenge, and burned the village. The Croats mobilized Slovene boys and men into the Croatian Home Guard", among the Ustaše, or sent them to the German army. In order to avoid conscription into the Ustasha army, men and boys chose to hide or join the partisans. Towards the end of the war, the Croatian occupied territories were occupied by the Partisans and were immediately rejoined to Slovenia.

== Number of victims ==
The overall number of World War II casualties in Slovenia is estimated at 97,000. The number includes about 14,000 people who were killed or died for other war-related reasons immediately after the end of the war, and the tiny Jewish community, which was nearly annihilated in the Holocaust. In addition, tens of thousands of Slovenes left their homeland soon after the end of the war. Most of them settled in Argentina, Canada, Australia and in the United States.

The overall number of World War Two casualties in Slovenia is estimated to 89,000, while 14,000 people were killed immediately after the end of the war. The overall number of World War II casualties in Slovenia was thus of around 7.2% of the pre-war population, which is above the Yugoslav average, and among the highest percentages in Europe.

== Non-extradition of the Italian war criminals ==
The documents found in British archives by the British historian Effie Pedaliu and by Italian historian Davide Conti, pointed out that the memory of the existence of the Italian concentration camps and Italian war crimes has been repressed due to the Cold War. Yugoslavia, Greece and Ethiopia requested extradition of 1,200 Italian war criminals who however never saw anything like the Nuremberg trial. The extraditions never took place because the Western Allies felt grateful for Marshal Pietro Badoglio's role in the 1943 overthrow of Mussolini and because they saw in his government a guarantee of an anti-Stalinist post-war Italy.

== See also ==
- Areas annexed by Nazi Germany
- Foibe massacres
- Gonars concentration camp
- Invasion of Yugoslavia
- Italian war crimes
- Maribor prison massacres
- Province of Ljubljana
- Rab concentration camp
- World War II in Yugoslavia
