= Greater Croatia =

Croatian nationalist ideology

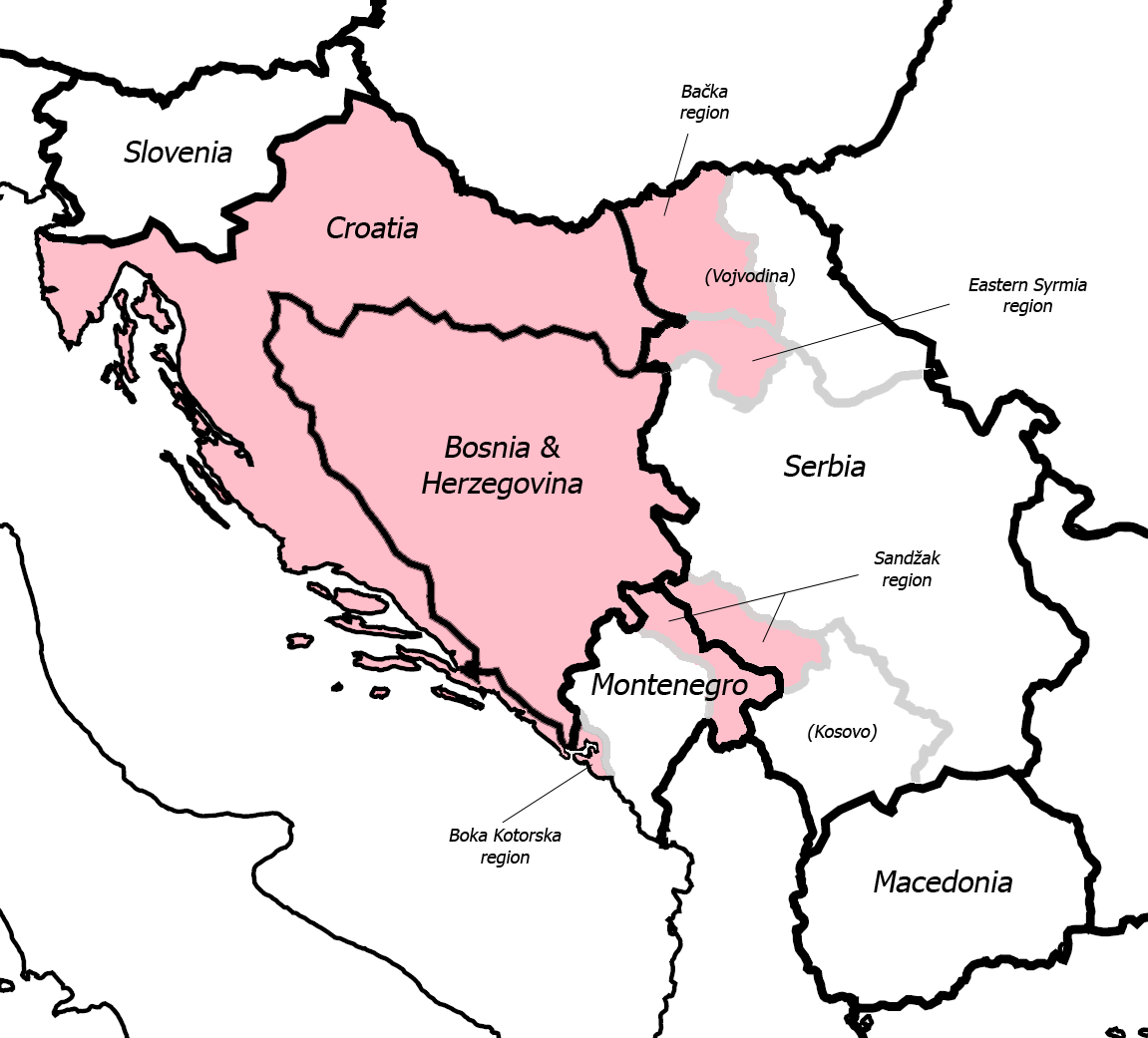
An outline of Greater Croatia as advocated by Dobroslav Paraga in 2006.

The concept of Greater Croatia (Croatian: Velika Hrvatska) describes the irredentist belief in the equivalence between the territorial scope of the Croat people and that of the country of Croatia. It is a foundational tenet within multiple variants of Croatian nationalism. The term has been used to describe the Croatian diaspora living in Southeast Europe as a regional sphere of influence. The Croatian language is spoken in many neighboring countries, extending its cultural reach abroad.

== Background ==
The concept of a Greater Croatian state has its modern origins with the Illyrian movement, a pan-South-Slavist cultural and political campaign with roots in the early modern period, and revived by a group of young Croatian intellectuals during the first half of the 19th century. Although this movement arose in the developing European nationalist context of the time, it particularly arose as a response to the more powerful nationalist stirrings in the then-Kingdom of Hungary, with whom Croatia was in a personal union.

The foundations of the concept of Greater Croatia are laid in late 17th and early 18th century works of Pavao Ritter Vitezović. He was the first ideologist of Croatian nation who proclaimed that all South Slavs are Croats. His works were used to legitimize expansionism of the Habsburg Empire to the east and south by asserting its historical rights to claim Illyria. "Illyria" as Slavic territory projected by Vitezović would eventually incorporate not only most of the Southeastern Europe but also parts of Central Europe such as Hungary. Vitezović defines territory of Croatia which, besides Illyria and all Slavic populated territory, includes all the territory between Adriatic, Black and Baltic seas.

Because the Kingdom of Hungary was so large, Hungary attempted processes of Magyarisation on its constituent territories. As a reaction, Ljudevit Gaj led the creation of the Illyrian movement. This movement aimed to establish Croatian national presence within Austria-Hungary through linguistic and ethnic unity among South Slavs. This was the first and most prominent Pan-Slavic movement in Croatian history. An early proponent of Croatian-based Pan-Slavism was the politician, Count Janko Drašković. In 1832, he published his Dissertation to the joint Hungarian-Croatian Diet, in which he envisioned a “Great Illyria” consisting of all the South Slav provinces of the Habsburg Empire. Likewise, the influential Bishop Josip Juraj Strossmayer, although a supporter of the Habsburg monarchy, nonetheless advocated merging the Kingdom of Dalmatia with Croatia.

The concept of a Greater Croatia was developed further by Ante Starčević and Eugen Kvaternik. The two founded the nationalist Party of Rights in 1861. Unlike Strossmayer and the proponents of the Illyrian movement, the Party of Rights advocated a united Croatia that stood independently of a Pan-Slavic umbrella state. For Starčević, a Greater Croatia covered modern-day Croatia, Bosnia and Herzegovina, and Slovenia and he viewed all South Slavs who inhabited the regions as Croats, regardless of their religion. In his view, Croatia included all the territory from the Alps in the north to Macedonia and the Bulgarian border to the south. The Bulgarians and Croats were the only South Slavic nations. He was an early opponent of Croatia's unification with Serbs and Slovenes (chiefly the Kingdom of Serbia). Starčević and Kvaternik's ideologies gradually gained popularity during the interwar period as tensions grew in the Kingdom of Yugoslavia between the Croatian and the more influential Serbian political leaders. Ensuing events surrounding the ideology culminated in the World War II conflict between the Independent State of Croatia and its opponents including Chetnik Serbs and Communists of all ethnicities (including Croatian).

== Cvetković–Maček Agreement ==
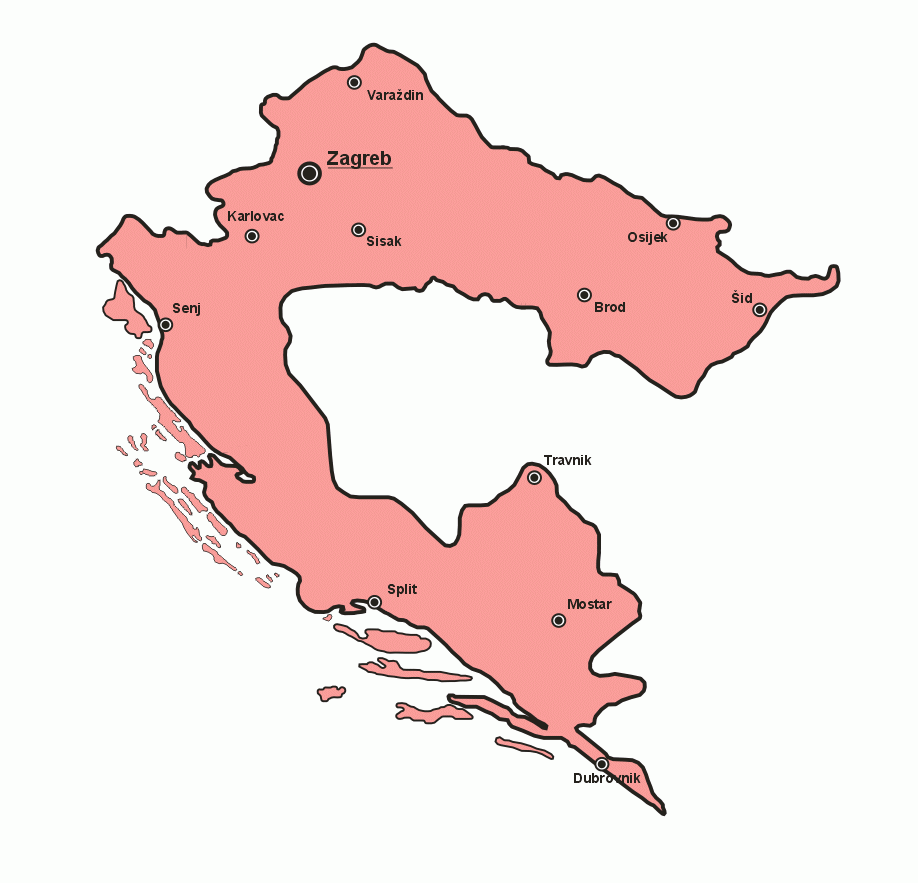
Map of the Banovina of Croatia in 1939

Amid rising ethnic tensions between Croats and Serbs in the 1930s, an autonomous state within Yugoslavia, called the Banovina of Croatia was peacefully negotiated in the Yugoslav parliament via the Cvetković–Maček Agreement of 1939. Croatia was united into a single territorial unit and was provided territories of parts of present-day Vojvodina, Posavina, and parts of Herzegovina and Central Bosnia, which had Croatian majority at the time.

== Independent State of Croatia ==
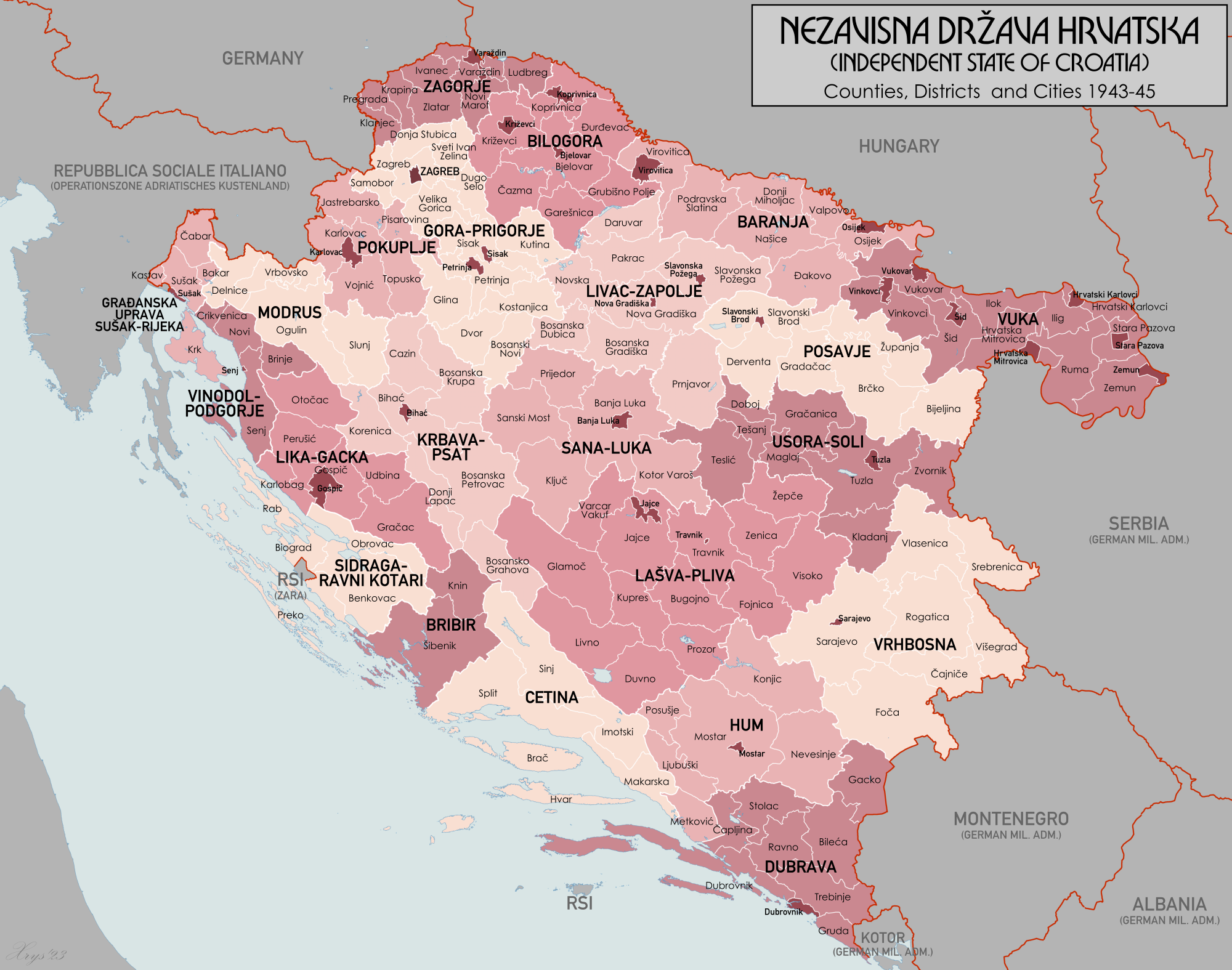
Districts of the Independent State of Croatia in 1943

The first modern development of a Greater Croatia came about with the establishment of the Independent State of Croatia (Croatian: Nezavisna Država Hrvatska, NDH). Following occupation of the country by Axis forces in 1941, Slavko Kvaternik, deputy leader of the Ustaše proclaimed the establishment of the NDH. The Ustaša, an ultranationalist and fascist movement founded in 1929 supported a Greater Croatia that would extend to the River Drina and to the edge of Belgrade. Ante Pavelić, the Ustaše's Poglavnik (leader) had been in negotiations with Fascist Italy since 1927. These negotiations included Pavelić supporting Italy's annexation of its claimed territory in Dalmatia in exchange for Italy supporting an independent Croatia. In addition, Benito Mussolini offered Pavelić the right for Croatia to annex all of Bosnia and Herzegovina. Pavelić agreed to this exchange. The Greater Croatian ideology, combined with Nazi racial theory, culminated in the genocide of Serbs, the Holocaust and the Porajmos in the NDH carried out by Ustaše. The NDH's territory encompassed most of modern-day Croatia, all of Bosnia and Herzegovina, part of modern-day Serbia, and a small portion of modern-day Slovenia (the five settlements of Bregansko Selo, Nova vas pri Bregani, Jesenice na Dolenjskem, Obrežje and Čedem).

== Bosnian War ==
The most recent expression of a Greater Croatia arose in the aftermath of the breakup of Yugoslavia. When the multiethnic Yugoslav republic of Bosnia and Herzegovina declared independence in 1992, Bosnian Serb political representatives, who had boycotted the referendum, established their own government of Republika Srpska, whereupon their forces attacked the Republic of Bosnia and Herzegovina.

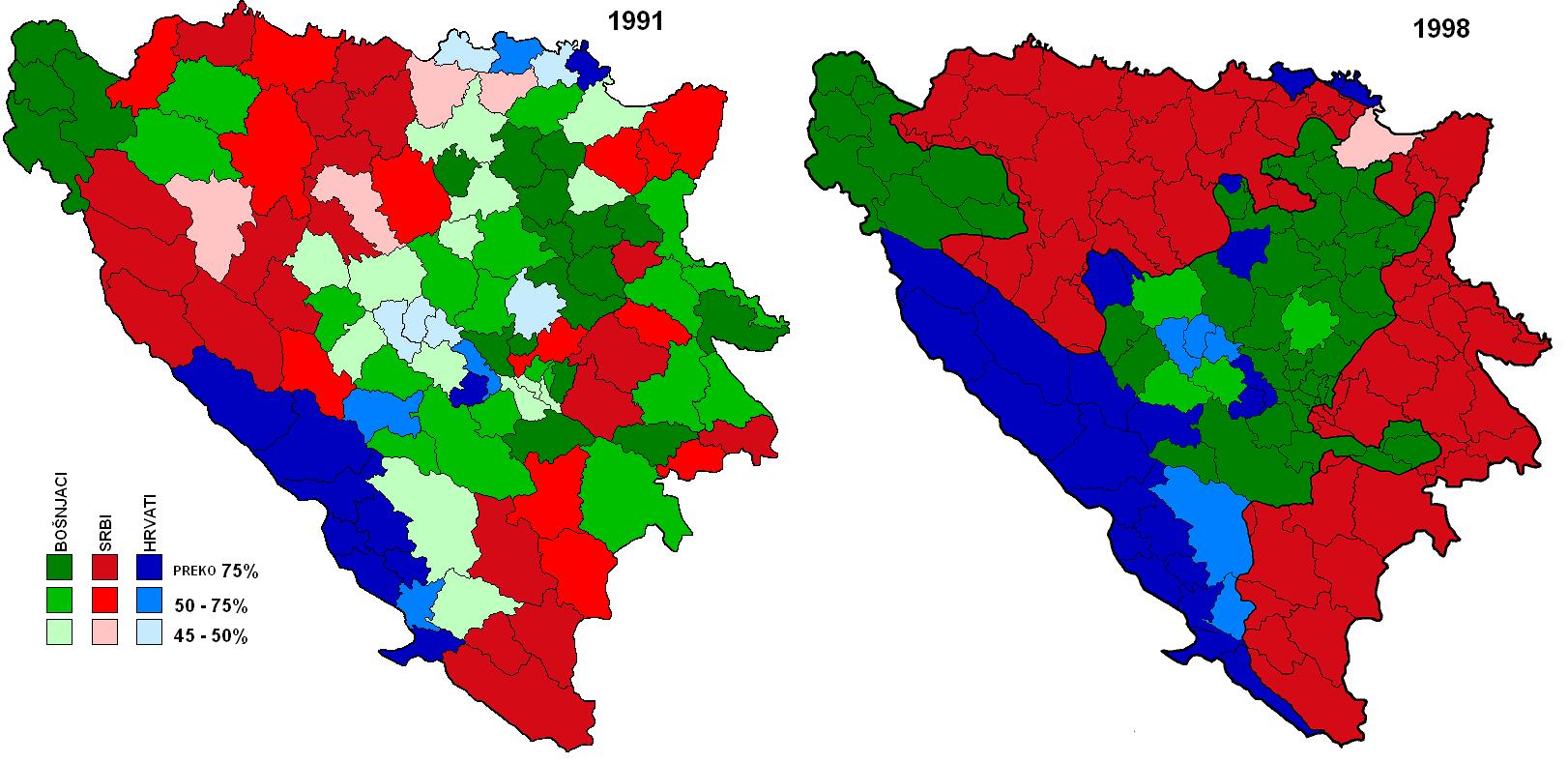
Croat-populated areas Territorial ethnic changes before and after the Bosnian War from 1992 to 1995

At the beginning of the Bosnian war, the Croats and Bosniaks formed an alliance against the Yugoslav People's Army (JNA) and the Army of Republika Srpska (VRS). The main Croat army was the Croatian Defence Council (HVO), and the Bosniak was the Army of the Republic of Bosnia and Herzegovina (ARBiH). In November 1991, the Croatian Community of Herzeg-Bosnia was established as an autonomous Croat territorial unit within Bosnia and Herzegovina.

The leaders of Herzeg-Bosnia called it a temporary measure during the conflict with the Serb forces and claimed it had no secessionary goal. The Croatian Defence Forces (HOS), a paramilitary wing of the Croatian Party of Rights, supported a confederation between Croatia and Bosnia and Herzegovina, but on the basis of the NDH. Over time, the relations between Croats and Bosniaks worsened, resulting in the Croat–Bosniak War, which lasted until early 1994 and the signing of the Washington Agreement.

Croatian President Franjo Tuđman was criticised for trying to expand the borders of Croatia, mostly by annexing Herzegovina and parts of Bosnia with Croat majorities. In 2013, the International Criminal Tribunal for the former Yugoslavia (ICTY) ruled, by a majority, that the Croatian leadership had a goal to join the areas of Herzeg-Bosnia to a "Greater Croatia", in accordance with the borders of the Banovina of Croatia in 1939. Judge Jean-Claude Antonetti, the presiding judge in the trial, issued a separate opinion in which he disputed the notion that Tuđman had a plan to divide Bosnia. On 29 November 2017, the Appeals Chamber concluded that Tuđman shared the ultimate purpose of "setting up a Croatian entity that reconstituted earlier borders and that facilitated the reunification of the Croatian people".

== Modern developments ==
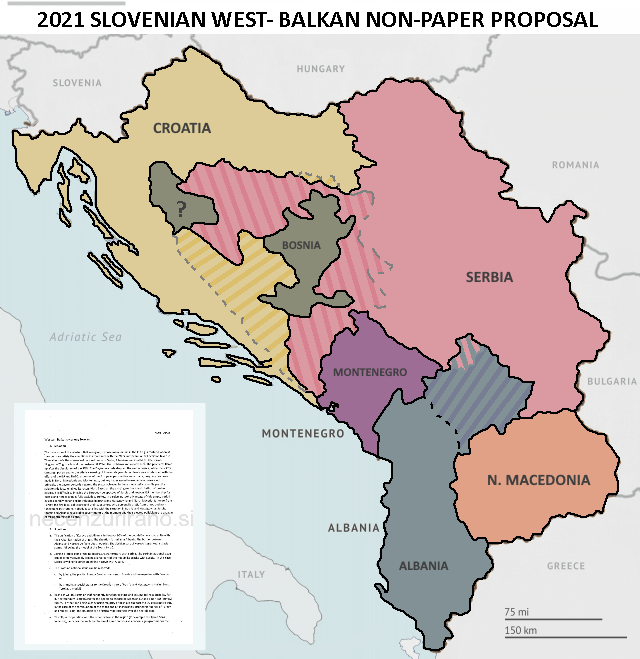
Map of the Western Balkans according to the first 2021 non-paper

The 2021 Balkan non-papers were two documents of unknown origin dealing with a suggested dissolution of Bosnia and Herzegovina, which several sources claimed had been drafted by the government of Slovenia. The first non-paper called for the "peaceful dissolution" of Bosnia and Herzegovina with the annexation of Republika Srpska and great parts of Herzegovina and Central Bosnia into a Greater Serbia and Greater Croatia, leaving a small Bosniak state in what is central and western Bosnia.

== Lands of Greater Croatia ==
The "sphere of influence" within Greater Croatia include:

- Croatia
- Bosnia and Herzegovina
- Bačka region (Serbia)
- Syrmia region (Croatia and Serbia)
- Boka Kotorska region (Montenegro)
- Sandžak

== See also ==
- Croatian state right
- Anti-Croat sentiment
- Greater Serbia
- Greater Bosnia
- United Slovenia
- Yugoslav irredentism
- Italian irredentism
- Hungarian irredentism

== Sources ==
- Banac, Ivo (1988). The National Question in Yugoslavia: Origins, History, Politics. Cornell University Press. ISBN 0-8014-9493-1.
- Christia, Fotini (2012). Alliance Formation in Civil Wars. Cambridge: Cambridge University Press. ISBN 978-1-13985-175-6.
- Goldstein, Ivo (1999). Croatia: A History. London: C. Hurst & Co. ISBN 978-1-85065-525-1.
- Hewitt, Dawn M. (1998). From Ottawa to Sarajevo: Canadian Peacekeepers in the Balkans. Kingston, Ontario: Centre for International Relations, Queen's University. ISBN 978-0-88911-788-4.
- Malcolm, Noel (1995). Povijest Bosne: kratki pregled [Bosnia: A Short History]. Erasmus Gilda. ISBN 9783895470820.
- Marijan, Davor (2004). "Expert Opinion: On the War Connections of Croatia and Bosnia and Herzegovina (1991–1995)". Journal of Contemporary History. 36. Zagreb, Croatia: Croatian Institute of History: 249–289.
- "Prosecutor v. Jadranko Prlić, Bruno Stojić, Slobodan Praljak, Milivoj Petković, Valentin Ćorić, Berislav Pušić – Judgement – Volume 6 of 6" (PDF). International Criminal Tribunal for the former Yugoslavia. 29 May 2013.
- Tanner, Marcus (2001). Croatia: A Nation Forged in War. New Haven: Yale University Press. ISBN 978-0-300-09125-0.
- Trencsényi, Balázs; Zászkaliczky, Márton (2010). Whose Love of Which Country?: Composite States, National Histories and Patriotic Discourses in Early Modern East Central Europe. BRILL. ISBN 978-90-04-18262-2.
- Fine, John V. A. (2010). When Ethnicity Did Not Matter in the Balkans: A Study of Identity in Pre-Nationalist Croatia, Dalmatia, and Slavonia in the Medieval and Early-Modern Periods. University of Michigan Press. ISBN 978-0-472-02560-2.
- Tomasevich, Jozo (2001). War and Revolution in Yugoslavia. Stanford University Press. ISBN 978-0-80477-924-1.
