= Liberation Front of the Slovene Nation =

Anti-fascist Slovene civil resistance and political organization during WWII

Liberation Front of the Slovene Nation Osvobodilna fronta slovenskega naroda
- Abbreviation: OF
- Leader: Boris Kidrič
- Founded: 26 April 1941
- Dissolved: 19 February 1944
- Merged into: People's Front of Yugoslavia
- Succeeded by: Slovene National Liberation Committee
- Armed wing: Slovene Partisans
- Ideology: Anti-fascism; Communism; Slovenian nationalism Yugoslavism; Factions: Christian socialism Liberalism
- Political position: Left-wing

Flag of the LFSN
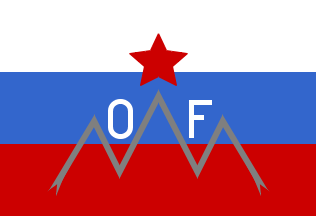

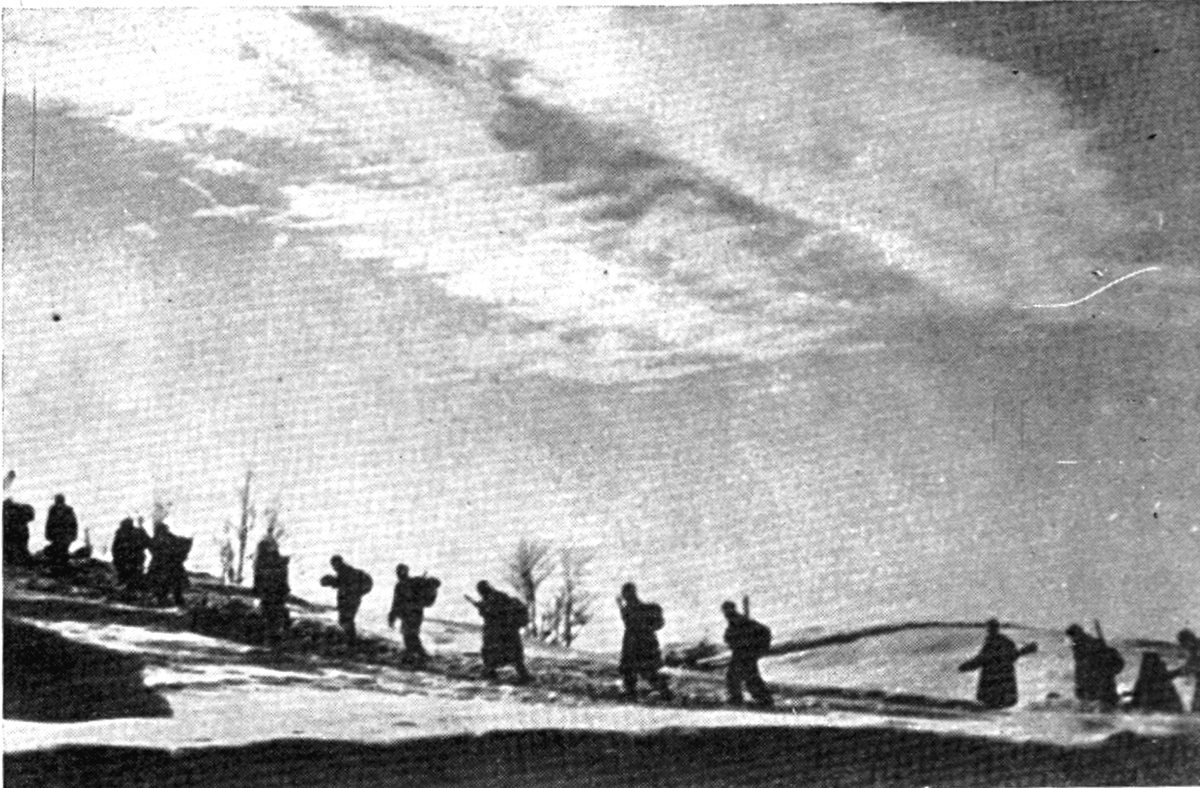
Slovene Partisans in winter 1942.

The Liberation Front of the Slovene Nation (Slovene: Osvobodilna fronta slovenskega naroda), or simply Liberation Front (Osvobodilna fronta, OF), originally called the Anti-Imperialist Front (Protiimperialistična fronta, PIF), was a Slovene anti-fascist political party. The Anti-Imperialist Front was led by the Communist Party of Slovenia and had ideological ties to the Soviet Union. In May 1941, weeks into the German occupation of Yugoslavia, in the first wartime issue of the illegal newspaper Slovenski poročevalec (Slovenian Reporter), members of the organization criticized the German regime and described Germans as imperialists. They started raising money for a liberation fund via the second issue of the newspaper published on 8 June 1941. When Germany attacked the Soviet Union, the Anti-Imperialist Front was formally renamed and became the main anti-fascist Slovene civil resistance and political organization under the guidance and control of the Slovene communists. It was active in the Slovene Lands during World War II. Its military arm was the Slovene Partisans. The organisation was established in the Province of Ljubljana on 26 April 1941 in the house of the literary critic Josip Vidmar. Its leaders were Boris Kidrič and Edvard Kardelj.

== Programme ==
The programme of the Fronta was outlined by the following fundamental points:

- Armed struggle
- United Slovenia
- Continuity of Yugoslavia as a Slovene state, further Slovene integration into Yugoslav identity and closeness with the Russian people
- Loyalty of all factions to the Liberation Front and by extension to the Yugoslav Partisans
- Adherence to democracy after the liberation
- Acceptance of the Atlantic Charter
- Outgrowth of the Partisan Units and People's Guards into a broader front of the National Liberation Struggle.

== Internal political situation ==
Although the Front originally consisted of multiple political groups of left-wing orientation, including some Christian Socialists, a dissident group of Slovene Sokols (also known as "National Democrats"), and a group of liberal intellectuals around the journals Sodobnost and Ljubljanski zvon, during the course of the war, the influence of the Communist Party of Slovenia started to grow, until the founding groups signed the so-called Dolomite Declaration (Dolomitska izjava), giving the exclusive right to organize themselves as a political party only to the communists, on 1 March 1943.

On 3 October 1943, on the session, known as Assembly of the Delegates of the Slovene Nation, which was held in Kočevje by the 572 directly elected and 78 indirectly elected members, the 120-member plenum was constituted as the highest civil governing organ of anti-fascist movement in Slovenia during the World War II.

After the war, the Liberation Front was transformed into the Socialist Alliance of the Working People of Slovenia.

== External political activity ==
The Anti-Imperialist Front had ideological ties to the Soviet Union (which was at the time in a non-aggression pact with Nazi Germany), was hostile to the United States and the United Kingdom (the western powers), and was led by the Communist Party of Slovenia.

On 19 February 1944, the 120-member Črnomelj plenum of Liberation Front of the Slovenian People changed its name to SNOS and proclaimed itself to be the temporary Slovenian parliament. One of its most important decisions was that after the end of the war, Slovenia would become a state within the Yugoslav federation.

Just before the end of the war, on May 5, 1945, the SNOS met for the last time in the town of Ajdovščina in the Julian March (then formally still part of the Kingdom of Italy) and established the Slovenian government with Boris Kidrič as its president.

The Liberation Front led an intensive and specific propaganda system. It printed flyers, bulletins and other material to persuade people about its cause and slander the occupying fascist forces and local Nazi collaborators who were supported by the Catholic Church. The Front's radio, called Kričač (Screamer), was the only one of its kind in the occupied Europe. It emitted from various locations, and occupying forces confiscated the receivers' antennas from the local population in order to prevent listening to it.

== Slovene Partisans ==
The Slovene Partisans were the armed wing of the Liberation Front, which fought in the beginning as guerillas and later as an army. It was mostly ethnically homogenous and primarily communicated in Slovene. These two features have been considered vital for its success. It was the first Slovene military force. Its most characteristic symbol was the Triglav cap. Contrary to elsewhere in Yugoslavia, where on the freed territories the political life was organized by the military itself, the Slovene Partisans were subordinated to the civil political authority of the Front. The partisan activities in Slovenia were initially independent of Tito's Partisans in the south. The merger of the Slovene Partisans with Tito's forces happened in 1944.

== The Front's name ==
It has been traditionally claimed by Slovene historians that the term Anti-Imperialist Front was the first to occur. This may be read for example in a work by Peter Vodopivec from 2006. In 2008, the historian Bojan Godeša published a peer-reviewed discussion about the name. He mentions a leaflet from the end of April 1941 with liberation front (non-capitalised) written on it, two months before the first known mention of the anti-imperialist front (non-capitalised) on 22 June 1941. He also mentions that Josip Rus, who represented the Slovene Sokol Society in the founding meeting of the OF, always claimed they had only discussed the organisation as the Liberation Front. That's contrary to the opinion by Josip Vidmar, also a founding member, who stated that the organisation was renamed as Liberation Front only on 30 June 1941. The claims by Godeša have been cited in a seminar by Božo Repe, another eminent historian, who added that the name Anti-Imperialist Front, written with capital letters, was used particularly in the communication with the Communists of the Soviet Union. He attributed this to the desire of the Slovene Communists to demonstrate that their work corresponded to the aims of the Comintern.

== See also ==
- AVNOJ
- Slovene Home Guard
