= Slovene National Liberation Committee =

The Slovene National Liberation Committee (SNOS) (Slovene: Slovenski narodnoosvobodilni svet; Serbo-Croatian: Slovensko narodnooslobodilačko vijeće, Словеначко народноослободилачко веће) was formed as the highest governing organ of anti-fascist movement of Slovenes during World War II. The president of its presidium was Josip Vidmar.

SNOS was formed on February 19, 1944 in Črnomelj when the 120-member Liberation Front Plenum, constituted in 1943 by the Assembly of the Delegates of the Slovene Nation in Kočevje, opted to change its name to SNOS and proclaim itself as the temporary Slovenian Parliament. One of its most important decisions was that after the end of the war Slovenia would become a state within the Socialist Federative Republic of Yugoslavia.

In spite of the fact the territory was occupied by Axis forces, SNOS was more than just a symbolic entity. Several important institutions functioned under its supervision. For example, it established even a Statistical Bureau of Slovenia on its session on August 19, 1944. Just before the end of the war, on May 5, 1945, the SNOS met for the last time in the town of Ajdovščina in the Julian March (then formally still part of the Kingdom of Italy) and established the Slovene government with the Communist leader Boris Kidrič as its president.

== See also ==
- Province of Ljubljana
- Slovene Partisans
- Communist Party of Slovenia
- AVNOJ
- People's Liberation War of Yugoslavia
