= Slovene Partisans =

Slovene part of the Communist-led Yugoslav World War II resistance movement

Liberation Front of the Slovenian People. and Partisan Detachments of Slovenia
- The flag of the Slovene Partisans
- Leaders: Boris Kidrič, Edvard Kardelj
- Dates active: 1941–1945
- Headquarters: mobile, attached to the Main Operational Group
- Active regions: Axis-annexed Slovene Lands
- Ideology: Anti-fascism; Anti-nationalism; Communism; Federalism; National liberation; Republicanism
- Size: Least (1941): 700–800 Peak (1944): 38,000
- Part of: Yugoslav Partisans

The Slovene Partisans, (Note: Slovene: Slovenski partizani) formally the National Liberation Army and Partisan Detachments of Slovenia, (Note: Slovene: Narodnoosvobodilna vojska in partizanski odredi Slovenije (NOV in POS)) were part of Europe's most effective anti-Nazi resistance movement led by Yugoslav revolutionary communists during World War II, the Yugoslav Partisans. The liberation movement lasted from April 26, 1941, until around May of 1945. Since a quarter of Slovene ethnic territory and approximately 327,000 out of total population of 1.3 million Slovenes were subjected to forced Italianization after the end of the First World War, and genocide of the entire Slovene nation was being planned by the Italian fascist authorities, the objective of the movement was the establishment of the state of Slovenes that would include the majority of Slovenes within a socialist Yugoslav federation in the postwar period.

Slovenia was in a rare position in Europe during the Second World War because only Greece shared its experience of being divided between three or more countries. However, Slovenia was the only one that experienced a further step—absorption and annexation into neighboring Germany, Italy, Croatia, and Hungary. As the very existence of the Slovene nation was threatened, the Slovene support for the Partisan movement was much more solid than in Croatia or Serbia. An emphasis on the defence of ethnic identity was shown by naming the troops after important Slovene poets and writers, following the example of the Ivan Cankar battalion. Slovene Partisans were the armed wing of the Liberation Front of the Slovene Nation, a resistance political organization and party coalition for what the Partisans referred to as the Slovene Lands. The Liberation Front was founded and directed by the Communist Party of Yugoslavia (KPJ), more specifically its Slovene branch: the Communist Party of Slovenia.

Being the first organized military force in the history of Slovenes, the Slovene Partisans were in the beginning organized as guerrilla units, and later as an army. Their opponents were the Axis forces in Slovenia, and after the summer of 1942, also anti-Communist Slovene forces. The Slovene Partisans were mostly ethnically homogeneous and primarily communicated in Slovene. These two features have been considered vital for their success. Their most characteristic symbol was a cap known as a triglavka. They were subordinated to the civil resistance authority. The Partisan movement in Slovenia, though a part of the wider Yugoslav Partisans, was operationally autonomous from the rest of the movement, being geographically separated, and full contact with the remainder of the Partisan army occurred after the breakthrough of Josip Broz Tito's forces through to Slovenia in 1944.

== Background ==
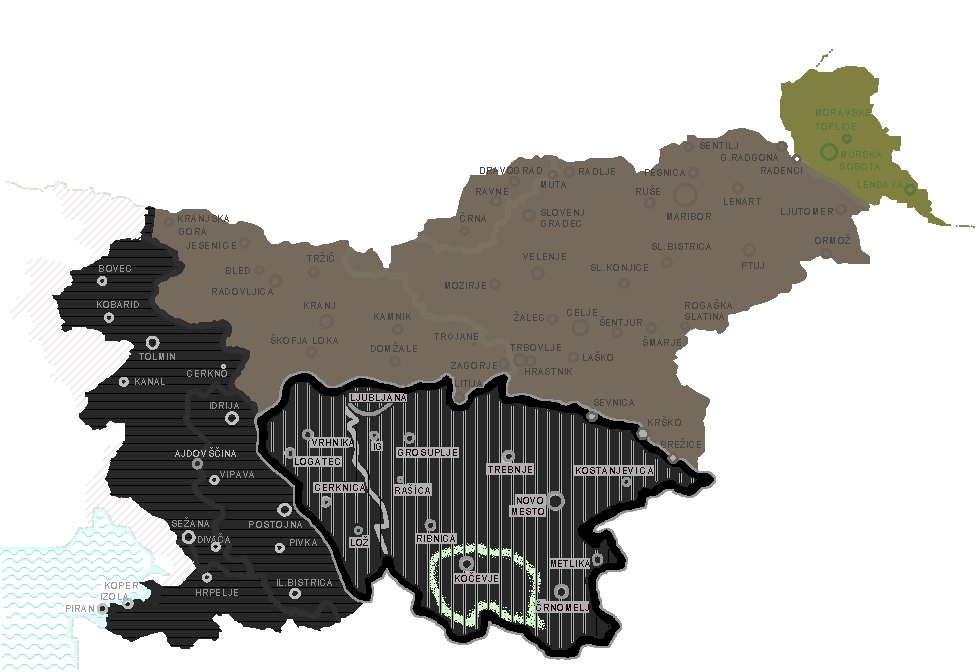
During World War II, Nazi Germany and Hungary annexed northern areas (brown and dark green areas, respectively), while Fascist Italy annexed the vertically hashed black area (solid black western part being annexed by Italy already with the Treaty of Rapallo). After 1943, Germany occupied the Italian-annexed area.

After World War I ended in 1918, the Slovene-settled territory partially fell under the rule of the neighboring states of Italy, Austria, and Hungary. Slovenes there were subjected to policies of forced assimilation.

On 6 April 1941, Yugoslavia was invaded by the Axis powers. Slovenia was divided among the Axis powers: Italy annexed southern Slovenia and Ljubljana, Nazi Germany took northern and eastern Slovenia, and Hungary annexed the Prekmurje region. Some villages in Lower Carniola were annexed by the Independent State of Croatia.

The Nazis started a policy of violent Germanisation. In the frame of their plan for the ethnic cleansing of Slovene territory, tens of thousands of Slovenes were resettled or chased away, imprisoned, or transported to labor, internment and extermination camps. The majority of Slovene victims of the Axis authorities were from the regions annexed by the Germans, i.e. Lower Styria, Upper Carniola, Central Sava Valley, and Slovenian Carinthia.

The Italian policy in the Province of Ljubljana gave Slovenes cultural autonomy, however the Fascist system was systematically introduced. After the establishment of the Liberation Front, the violence against the Slovene civil population in the zone escalated and easily matched the German. The province was subjected to brutal repression. Alongside summary executions, the burning of houses and villages, hostage-taking and hostage executions, the Province of Ljubljana saw the deportation of 25,000 people, which equaled 7.5% of the total population, to different concentration camps.

== Rise of Communist Movement ==
The Communist Party of Slovenia (KPS) was founded on April 26, 1937, as the first autonomous regional branch of the Communist Party of Yugoslavia (KPJ) operating under the latter's central directives from Belgrade. The establishment followed KPJ's 1934 decision to organize national subunits, with Edvard Kardelj, a Slovenian communist active since the 1920s, playing a leading role in its formation and ideological orientation. As an illegal entity in the Kingdom of Yugoslavia where communist parties had been outlawed since the 1921 Obrana Zakona (Law for the Protection of the State) the KPS conducted clandestine activities aimed at subverting the monarchical regime.

== Formation, organisation, and ideological affiliation of the membership ==
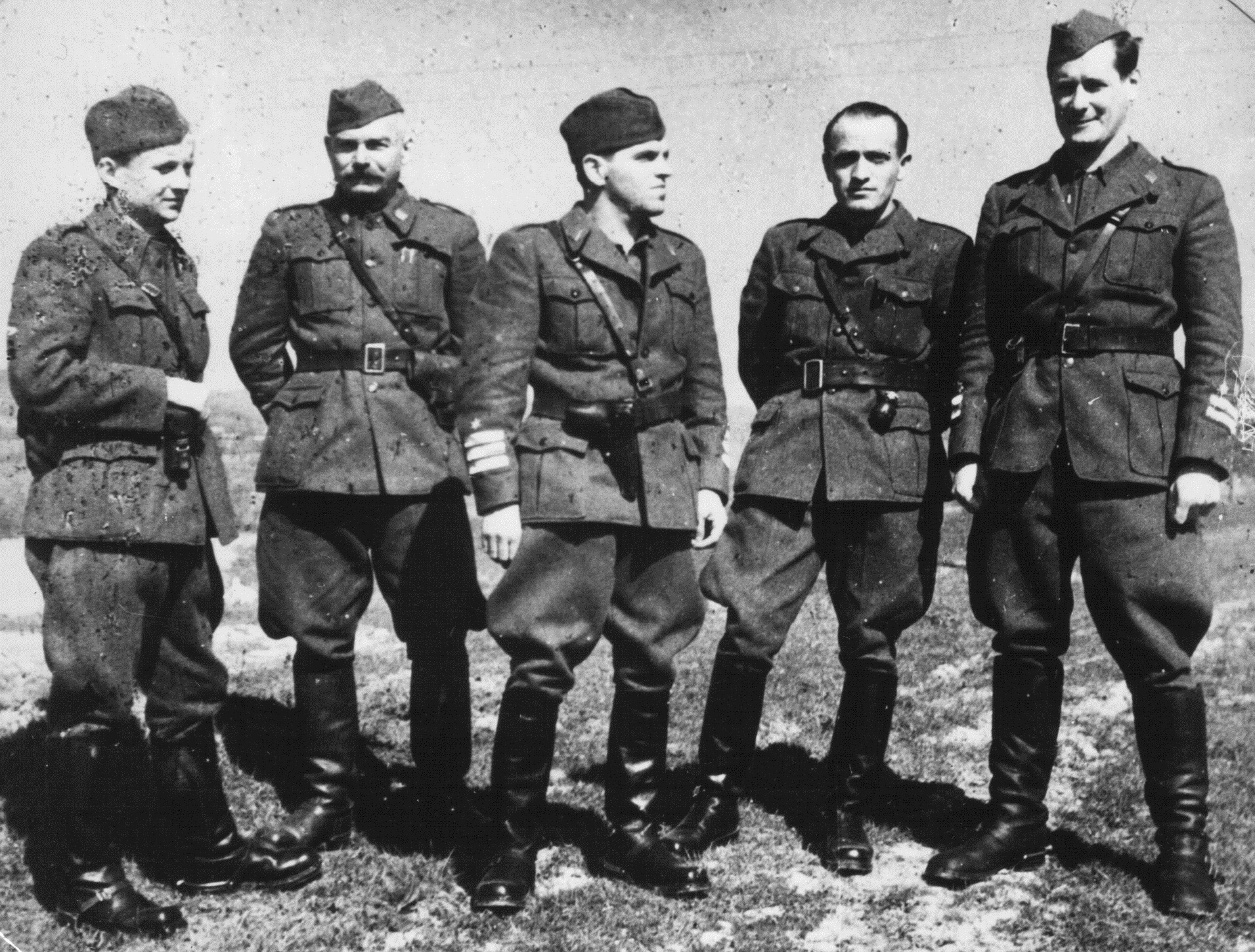
Main staff of National Liberation Army in 1944. From left to right: Boris Kraigher, Jaka Avšič, Franc Rozman, Viktor Avbelj and Dušan Kveder.

In both Slovene Partisans squads and in the "field committees" of the Liberation Front of the Slovene Nation the Communists were indeed in the minority. During the course of the war, the influence of the Communist Party of Slovenia started to grow. Nowhere else in Yugoslav territory did the Partisan movement have a plural political composition like it did have in Liberation Front of the Slovene Nation, so the Yugoslav Communist Party wanted that the Slovene partisans should be brought under more exclusive Communist control. This was not officially declared until the Dolomite Declaration of 1 March 1943.

The High Command of the Slovene Partisans (Supreme Command at first) was established by the Central Committee of the Communist Party of Slovenia on 22 June 1941. The command members were the commander Franc Leskošek (nom de guerre Luka), the political commissar Boris Kidrič (succeeded by Miha Marinko), deputy commander Aleš Bebler (nom de guerre Primož), and members Stane Žagar, Oskar Kovačič, Miloš Zidanšek, Dušan Podgornik, and Marijan Brecelj. The decision to start armed resistance was passed at a meeting on 16 July 1941.

The first partisan shot in the Slovene Lands was fired by one Miha Novak on 22 July 1941 at a former Yugoslav policeman who was claimed to have collaborated with the Germans and to have betrayed to them local supporters of the Communist Party. The man was attacked by the Šmarna Gora Partisan group from an ambush at Pšatnik Forest near Tacen. The Germans arrested about 30 people and executed two of them.

In the latter Socialist Republic of Slovenia, 22 July was celebrated as the Day of the National Rising. The historian Jože Dežman stated in 2005 that this was a celebration of a day when a Slovene wounded another Slovene by shooting and that it symbolised the victory of the Communist Party over its own nation. In addition to the war against the Axis forces, there was a civil war going on in the Slovene Lands and both the Communist and the anti-Communist side tried to cover it, according to Dežman.

At the very beginning the Partisan forces were small, poorly armed and without any infrastructure, but Spanish Civil War veterans amongst them had some experience with guerrilla warfare. Some of the members of Liberation Front and partisans were ex-members of the TIGR resistance movement.

== Autonomy ==
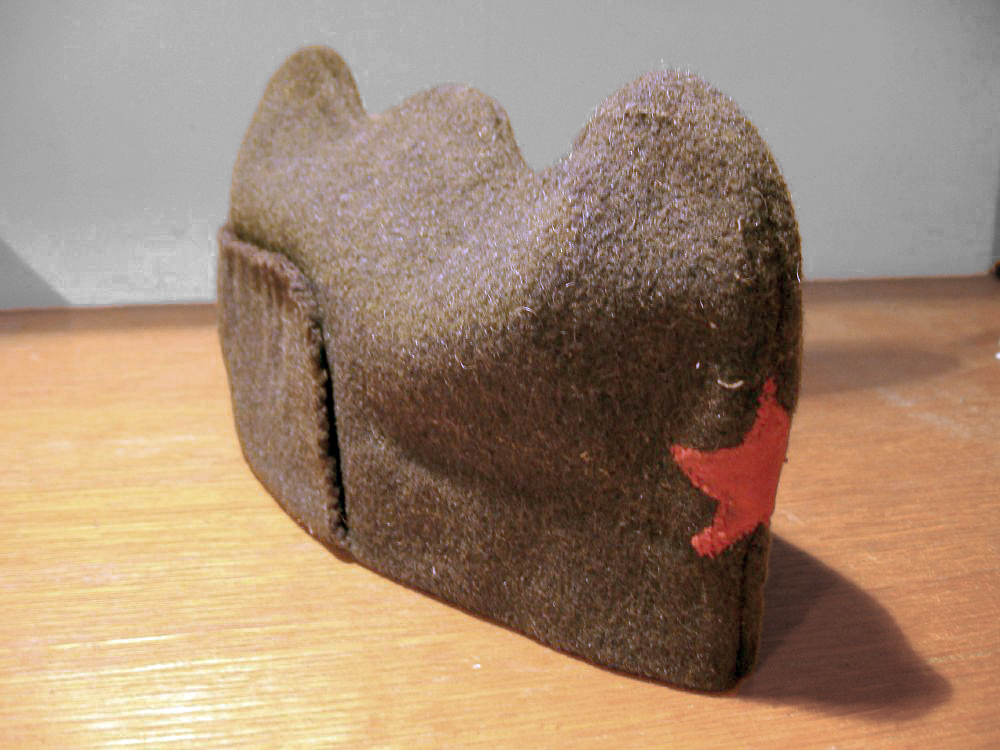
A triglavka, as used by the Slovene Partisans

The partisan activities in Slovenia were initially independent of Tito's Partisans in the south. In autumn 1942, Tito attempted for the first time to control the Slovene resistance movement. Arso Jovanović, a leading Yugoslav communist who was sent from Tito's Supreme Command of Yugoslav partisan resistance, ended his mission to establish central control over the Slovene partisans unsuccessfully in April 1943.

The merger of the Slovene Partisans with Tito's forces happened in 1944. The Slovene Partisans retained their specific organizational structure and Slovene language as commanding language until the last months of World War II, when their language was removed as the commanding language. From 1942 till after 1944, they wore the triglavka, which was then gradually replaced with the Titovka cap as part of their uniform. In March 1945, the Slovene Partisan Units were officially merged with the Yugoslav Army and thus ceased to exist as a separate formation. The General Staff of the Slovene Partisan Army was abolished in May 1945.

== Cooperation with Allies ==
In June 1943 Major William Jones arrived at the high command of the Slovene resistance units located in the Kočevje forest as the envoy of a British-American military mission, and one month later the Slovene Partisans received their first consignment of arms from the Allies.

== Number of combatants ==
The estimates of the number of Slovene Partisans differ. Despite solid support among Slovenes, the numbers of Slovene Partisans was quite small and increased only in the latter stages of the war. There were no more than 700–800 Slovene Partisans in August 1941, about 2000 in the end of 1941, 5,500 in September 1943, at the time of the capitulation of Italy. According to Slovene Historical Atlas, published in 2011, in summer 1942 there were 5,300 Slovene partisans and 400 members of the Home Guard, a year after in summer 1943 there was unchanged number, i.e. 5,300 Slovene partisans, but the number of members of the Home Guard increased to 6,000, also there were 200 members of the Slovene Chetniks, in autumn 1943 (after the capitulation of Italian army) there were 20,000 Slovene partisans, 3,000 members of the Home Guard and no Slovene Chetniks left, while in summer 1944 there were 30,000 Slovene partisans, 17,000 members of the Home Guard and 500 members of the Slovene Chetniks, and in winter 1945 the number of Slovene partisans increased to 34,000, while the number of members of the Home Guard and members of the Slovene Chetniks was unchanged. In December 1944, there were 38,000 Slovene Partisans, which was the peak number.

=== Ethnic German Partisans ===
Although the majority of Gottschee ethnic Germans obeyed the Nazi Germany which issued an order that all of them should relocate from Province of Ljubljana, which had been annexed by the Fascist Italy, to the "Ranner Dreieck" or Brežice Triangle, which was in the German annexation zone, 56 refused to leave their homes, and instead joined Slovene Partisans fighting against the Italians.

== Logistics ==
In December 1943, Franja Partisan Hospital was built in difficult and rugged terrain, only a few hours from Austria and the central parts of Germany.

== Civil war and postwar killings ==
The civil war that broke out in Slovenia during the Second World War was, ideologically and politically, the result of the conflict between two authoritarian ideologies: Bolshevik communism and Catholic clericalism. Communists were unreceptive to warnings of harmful consequences of the rash elimination of opponents. With the success of the Slovene Partisan movement in spring and summer 1942, they began to be convinced that the national liberation phase was to be continued with the revolutionary one, which had already led to violent encounters with Catholic activists, who began to leave the Partisan ranks. The Communist security service killed 60 people in the first few months of 1942 in Ljubljana alone; people who the Communist leadership had proclaimed as collaborators and informers. After the assassination of Lambert Ehrlich, and 429 shot by VOS (varnostno-obeščevalna služba; security and intelligence service) agents in May 1942, and especially the murder of a number of priests, Bishop Rožman rejected the OF (osvobodilna fronta; liberation front) and Partisans outright. Part of the clergy continued to support the Partisan movement and performed religious ceremonies for them, burying killed Partisans in church graveyards, etc. Gottschee ethnic German priest Josef Gliebe, who preferred to stay with those who did not want to be moved away, helped Partisans with food, shoes and clothes, being labelled "red one" by Slovene Home Guard.

In the summer of 1942, a civil war between Slovenes broke out. The two fighting factions were the Slovenian Partisans and the Italian-sponsored anti-communist militia, known as the "White Guard", later re-organized under Nazi command as the Slovene Home Guard. Small units of Slovenian Chetniks also existed in Lower Carniola and Styria. The Partisans were under the command of the Liberation Front (OF) and Tito's Yugoslav resistance, while the Slovenian Covenant served as the political arm of the anti-Communist militia. The civil war was mostly restricted to the Province of Ljubljana, where more than 80% of the Slovene anti-partisan units were active. Between 1943 and 1945, smaller anti-Communist militia existed in parts of the Slovene Littoral and in Upper Carniola, while they were virtually non-existent in the rest of the country. By 1945, the total number of Slovene anti-Communist militiamen reached 17,500. Over 28,000 Partisans were killed due to the war, compared to over 14,000 anti-Communists, most of which were killed after the war. The Slovene Partisans and revolutionary forces killed over 24,000 Slovenes during and after World War II, and contributed to the killings of 15% of all Slovene victims of the war. The anti-communist forces killed about 4,400 Slovenes in their independent actions, not including those killed in joint actions with the Axis forces; those are attributed to the Axis forces.

== Notable members ==
Members of Slovene Partisans who are today internationally most notable include:

- Jože Brilej (1910–1981), politician, diplomat, President of the United Nations Security Council, Chief Justice of the Slovenian supreme court
- Karel "Kajuh" Destovnik (1922–1944), poet and literary hero
- Boris Pahor (1913-2022), writer and public intellectual, Nazi concentration camps survivor, who opposed Italian Fascism and Titoist Communism
- Valerija Skrinjar Tvrz (1928–2023), codebreaker, journalist, writer and translator

== See also ==
- World War II in Yugoslavia
- Monuments to the Slovene Partisans
