= Assembly of the Delegates of the Slovene Nation =

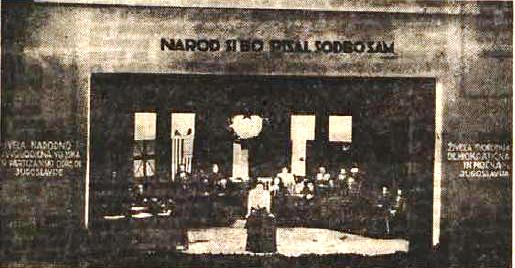
Assembly of the Delegates of the Slovene Nation

The Assembly of the Delegates of the Slovene Nation (Slovene: Zbor odposlancev slovenskega naroda) or the Kočevje Assembly (Kočevski zbor) was the session held in Kočevje in what is now southern Slovenia over the period 1–3 October 1943 by the highest representative body of the anti-fascist Partisan movement in Slovenia during World War II. The assembly elected the legislative body of the Slovene liberated areas.

In September 1943, just as the Italians capitulated to the Allies, the Liberation Front of the Slovene Nation conducted public elections in liberated areas of the Italian-annexed Province of Ljubljana. The 572 of the directly elected and 78 indirectly elected delegates of the Liberation Front of the Slovene Nation met at Kočevje in what then became the German-occupied Operational Zone of the Adriatic Littoral. During its deliberations, the Assembly elected the 120-member legislative body known as the Slovene National Liberation Committee (Slovenski narodnoosvobodilni odbor), and the Presidium of the Committee assumed executive powers. The Committee sent representatives to the second session of AVNOJ held at Jajce, in central Bosnia on 29 November 1943. They were instrumental in adding the self-determination clause to the resolution on the establishment of the future federal Yugoslavia.

At the Črnomelj Session on 19–20 February 1944, the Slovene National Liberation Committee renamed itself to the Slovene National Liberation Council (Slovenski narodnoosvobodilni svet, SNOS). It was the Slovene equivalent of similar councils established by the Partisans in other regions of Yugoslavia. After its creation, SNOS acceded to all decisions of the second session of AVNOJ and also established an interim government.
