= Union of Pioneers of Yugoslavia =

Yugoslav political youth organization

Union of Pioneers of Yugoslavia Савез пионира Југославије, Savez pionira Jugoslavije
- Emblem: "Za domovinu s Titom naprijed!" ("Forward for the homeland with Tito!")

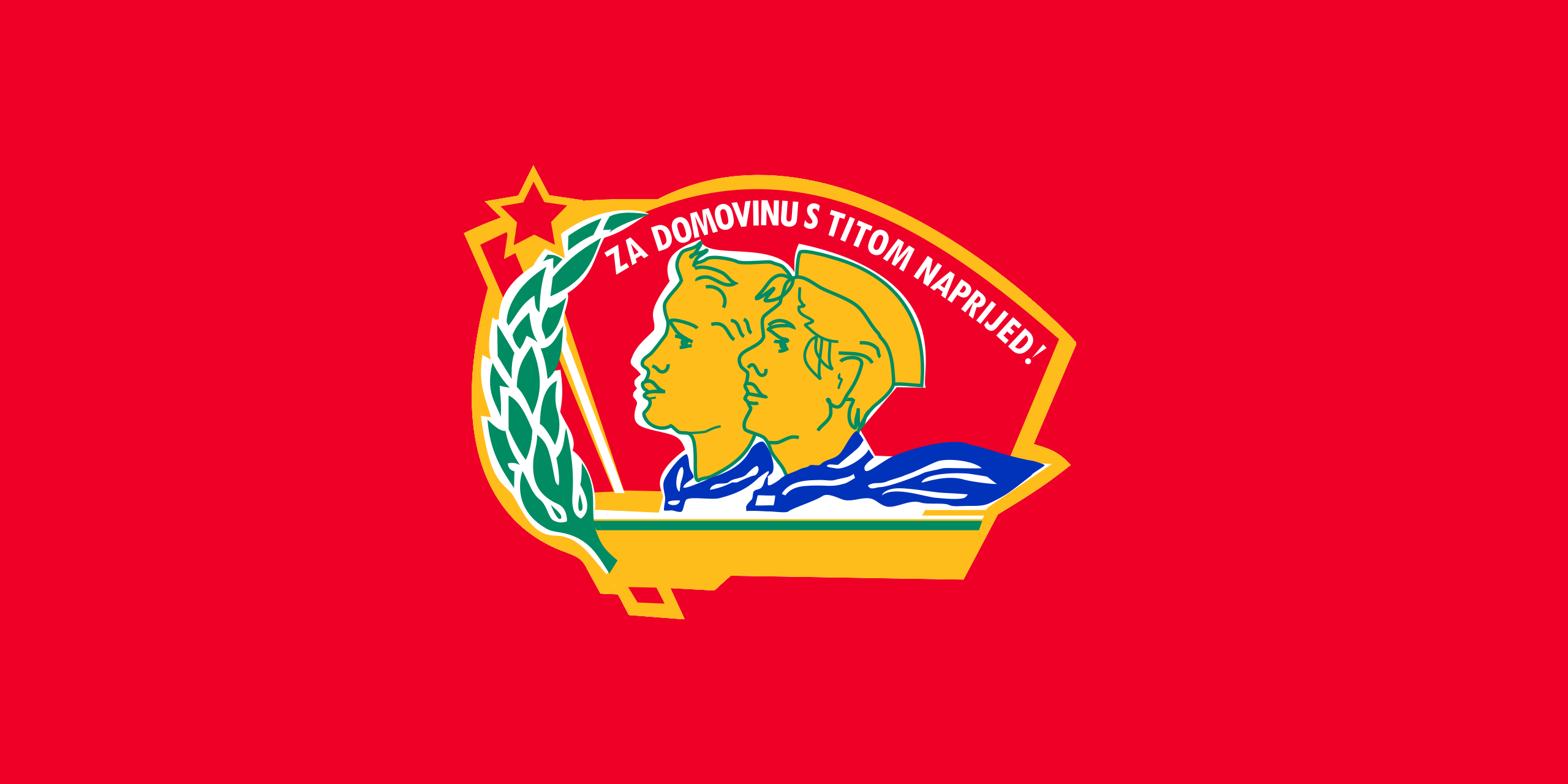
- Flag
- Founded: 27 December 1942
- Dissolved: 1992
- Headquarters: Belgrade, SR Serbia, SFR Yugoslavia
- Ideology: Communism; Marxism–Leninism; Titoism; Anti-fascism
- Mother party: League of Communists of Yugoslavia

Union of Pioneers of Yugoslavia (Serbo-Croatian: Savez pionira Jugoslavije / Савез пионира Југославије; Slovene: Zveza pionirjev Jugoslavije (ZPJ); Macedonian: Сојуз на пионери на Југославија) also known as Tito's Pioneers (Serbo-Croatian: Titovi pioniri / Титови пионири; Slovene: Titovi pionirji; Macedonian: Титовите пионери) was the pioneer movement of the Socialist Federal Republic of Yugoslavia. Its members, basically all children of age seven and older, attended an annual ceremony and wore uniforms.

The uniforms consisted of red scarves as well as navy blue hats called Titovka. These hats were sometimes white, and bore a red star on the front. A white shirt was often worn with the Pioneer scarf (marama) and the Titovka, although this varied depending on which part of Yugoslavia the particular pioneer was from. Boys often wore navy blue shorts or pants, and girls wore skirts in the same colour, along with white stockings and black shoes. On special occasions, such as a visit from Josip Broz Tito, Pioniri sometimes wore traditional costumes from their native regions of Yugoslavia.

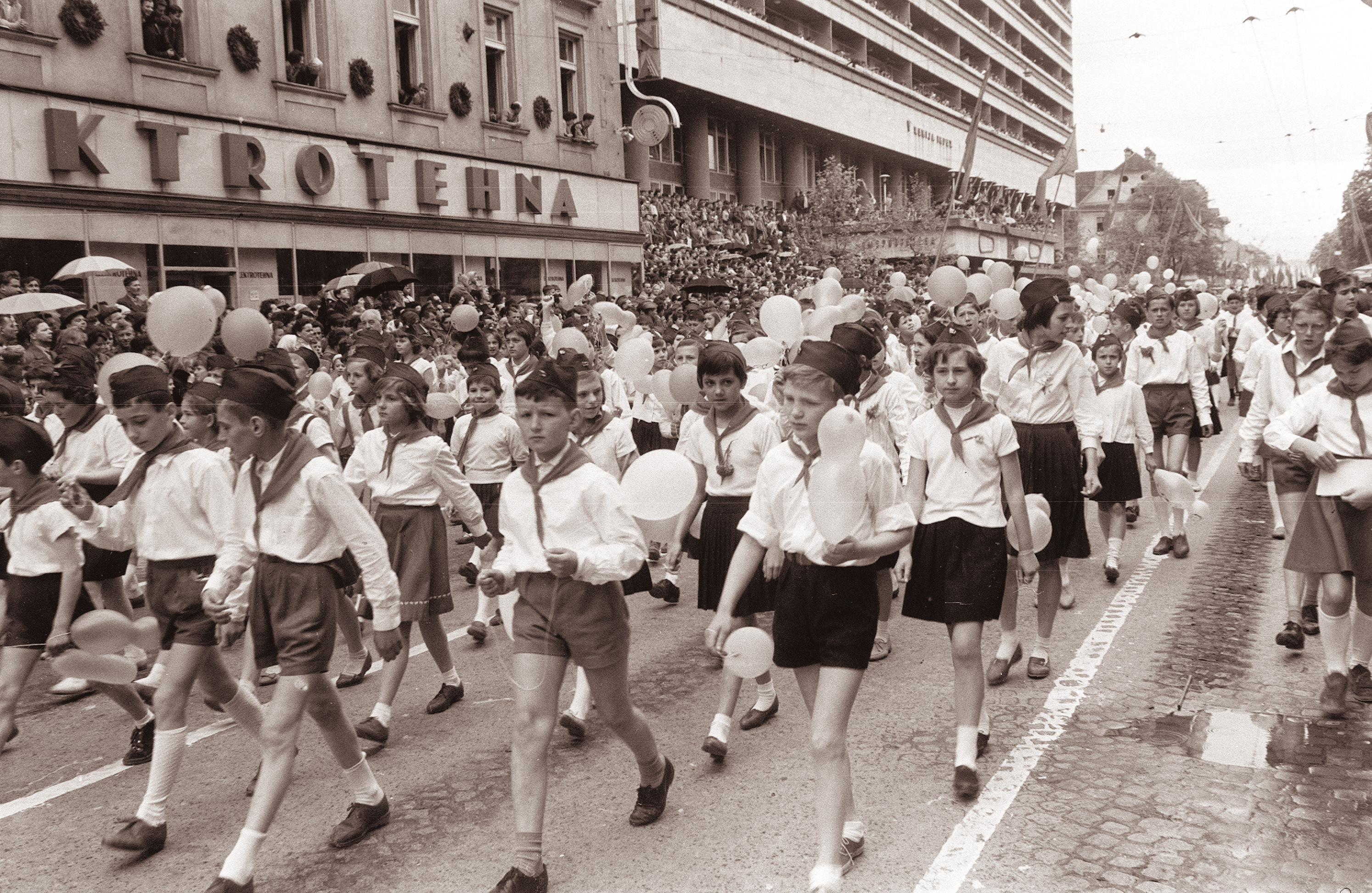
Pioneers at the 1961 1 May parade in Ljubljana

The organization was founded on 27 December 1942. It was a substructure within the League of Communist Youth and, after 1948, the League of Socialist Youth. It published Male novine. The organization was divided into younger pioneers (7–11 years) and older pioneers (11–15 years).

Unlike other pioneer movements the full military salute was used, honoring the children and youth who fought as part of the Yugoslav Partisans of the Second World War.

== Induction and pledge ==
Typically, the induction ceremony took place in school for children aged 7 in the autumn of their first year in school, as part of the Republic Day celebrations. Following the ceremony, the children would be given a red Pioneer Booklet, similar to a communist party membership booklet. The booklet was signed by the "President of the Pioneer Committee", a senior pioneer and served as evidence of membership. The youngest generation that undertook it was born in 1982, which occurred during the 1989–1990 school year. The text of Yugoslav Pioneer pledge (pionirska zakletva) may have varied slightly from one school to another. Reconstructed from imperfect recollections, in Serbo-Croatian (Ekavian and Ijekavian pronunciations):

Danas, kada postajem pionir,
dajem časnu pionirsku riječ/reč
da ću marljivo učiti i raditi,
poštovati roditelje i starije,
i biti vjeran/veran i iskren drug,
koji drži datu riječ/reč,
da ću voljeti/voleti našu domovinu,
samoupravnu Socijalističku Federativnu Republiku Jugoslaviju,
da ću razvijati bratstvo i jedinstvo
i ideje za koje se borio drug Tito,
da ću cijeniti/ceniti sve ljude svijeta/sveta koji žele slobodu i mir!

In Macedonian:

Денес, кога станувам пионер,
давам чесен пионерски збор,
дека вредно ќе учам и работам,
ќе ги почитувам родителите и постарите,
и ќе бидам искрен и верен другар,
кој држи даден збор,
дека ќе го сакам нашиот дом,
Самоуправна Социјалистичка Федеративна Република Југославија,
ќе развивам братство и единство
и идеите за кои се борел другарот Тито,
ќе ги ценам сите луѓе на светот кои сакаат слобода и мир!

In Slovene:

Danes, ko postajam pionir
dajem častno pionirsko besedo
da se bom pridno učil in delal,
spoštoval starše in učitelje,
da bom zvest in iskren tovariš,
ki drži svojo obljubo,
da se bom ravnal po zgledu najboljših pionirjev,
da bom spoštoval slavna dejanja partizanov,
in napredne ljudi sveta,
ki žele svobodo in mir,
da bom ljubil svojo domovino
samoupravno Socialistično Federativno Republiko Jugoslavijo,
njene bratske narode in narodnosti
in gradil novo življenje, polno sreče in radosti.

In English:

Today, when I become a pioneer,
I give my honorable pioneer word
that I will study and work diligently,
respect my parents and elders,
and be a faithful and sincere comrade,
who keeps his/her word,
that I will love our homeland,
the self-governing Socialist Federal Republic of Yugoslavia,
that I will develop brotherhood and unity
and the ideas for which Comrade Tito fought,
that I will appreciate all the people of the world who want freedom and peace!

Self-managing socialist Yugoslavia.
brotherly nations and nationalities

Across the former-Yugoslav territory (Slovenia, Croatia, Bosnia and Herzegovina, Serbia, Montenegro, North Macedonia), many remember their days as Pioneers, and as a result, it is not uncommon to hear people refer to themselves as "Titov(a) pionir(ka)", meaning "Tito's Pioneer".

== Function ==
The focus of being a Pioneer was to convert "ideologically undecided" future generations to "ideologically decided" communists. Yugoslav pioneers learned the basic tenets of socialism and the role of the state.

The social function of becoming a pioneer in communist countries was similar to that of First Communion in Roman Catholic Church. In both cases, a child at the critical age of around seven is initiated as a member of a group within which the individuals share certain values and culture. This early initiation increases the likelihood that, once the child becomes an adult, they will identify with the group.

Children were taught to be responsible and respectful, were asked to study hard and were considered the future generations of the nation.

== See also ==
- Pioneer Movement
- League of Socialist Youth of Yugoslavia
- Young Pioneer organization of the Soviet Union
- Young Pioneer camp
