= Šajkača =

Traditional Serbian cap

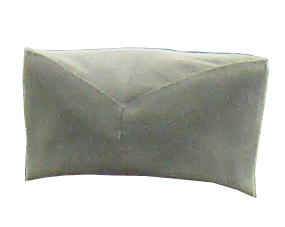
- Šajkača
- Type: Cap
- Place of origin: Serbia
- Introduced: 18th century

The šajkača (Serbian: шајкача, pronounced [ʃǎjkatʃa]) is the Serbian national hat or cap. Traditionally worn by men in the Serbian countryside, it is named after Serb river troops known as šajkaši. A popular national symbol in Serbia since the beginning of the 20th century, it is typically black, grey or green in colour and is usually made of soft, homemade cloth. It became widely worn by Serb men beginning in the 1880s and was a key component in the uniform of the Serbian military from the end of the 19th century. Today, it is mostly worn by elderly men in rural communities.

== History ==
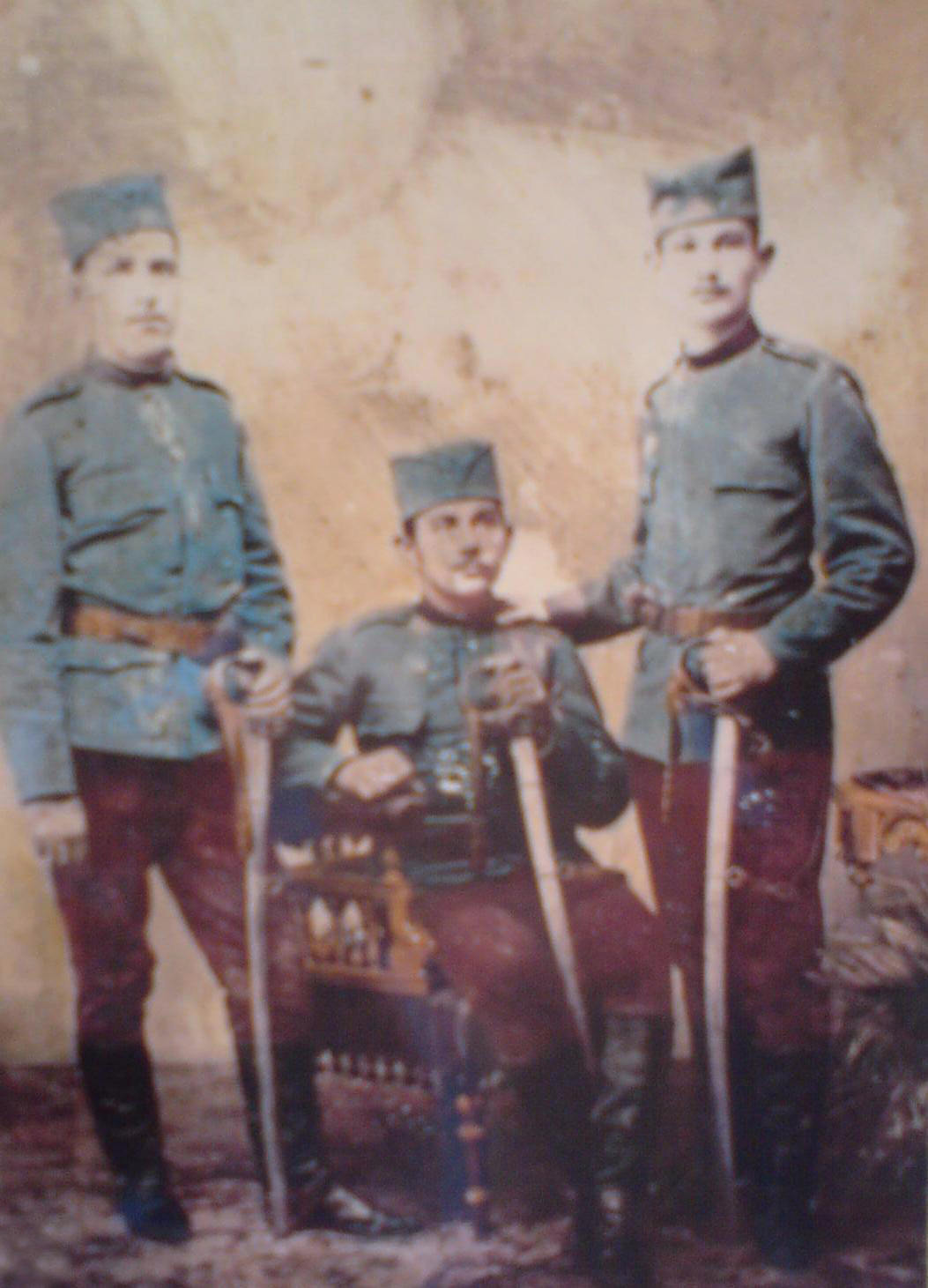
Royal Serbian Army conscripts, 1901

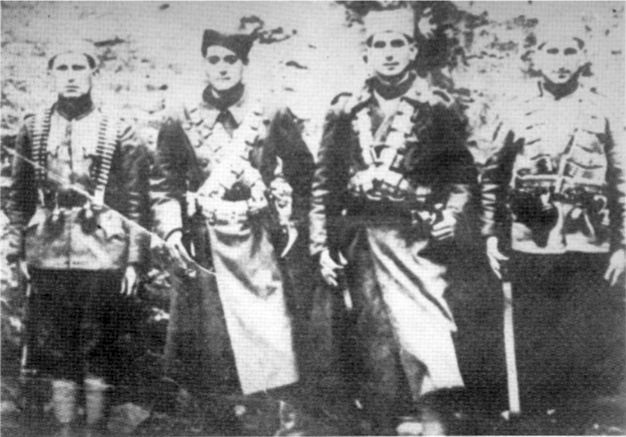
Serbian partisans, 1941

The šajkača is believed to have originated in the Serbian region of Banat during the 18th century, when šajkaši (Serb river troops in the service of the Austrian Empire) guarded the Danube and Sava rivers against the Ottoman Empire and wore caps in the shape of an overturned chaika (Serbian: шајка) boat.

Through most of the 19th century, the fez was the dominant choice of headwear for both Muslims and Christians in the Balkans, and fezzes were frequently emblazoned with national or religious symbols. In Serbia, for example, regulations for ministerial uniforms from 1850 required the Serbian coat of arms be featured on officials' red fezzes. It was not until the decade following the Serbian-Ottoman Wars of 1876–1878 that the šajkača began to overtake the fez in popularity among Serbs and thus very few paintings or photographs exist featuring the šajkača in use prior to the early 20th century.

The typical cap of peasants from the Šumadija region of Serbia, the šajkača eventually acquired a dual purpose: it was worn by civilians in the countryside, and it became part of the standard Serbian military uniform other than in full dress. During World War I, the cap was regularly worn by the soldiers of the Kingdom of Serbia. Serbia was eventually overrun by a combined Austro-Hungarian, German and Bulgarian invasion in 1915, and in 1916 the wearing of the šajkača, alongside other Serbian folk attire, was outlawed by Bulgarian authorities in the wake of the Bulgarian occupation of southern Serbia.

During World War II, the šajkača was the standard hat worn by Serbian Chetnik irregulars in the Axis-occupied Kingdom of Yugoslavia. It was also worn by Serbian Partisans. After the war, it was replaced by the Titovka cap in the armed forces of communist Yugoslavia.

The šajkača was worn by Serb soldiers during the breakup of Yugoslavia. Bosnian Serb reservists and paramilitaries wore the cap during the 1992–95 Bosnian War, and it was later adopted by Bosnian Serb forces to be the official headgear of the Army of Republika Srpska (Serbian: Vojska Republike Srpske, VRS). Following the 1991 Battle of Vukovar, fought during the Croatian War of Independence, Croatian Serb authorities erected gravestones to the Serb soldiers who were killed fighting for the city. These were originally topped with sculptural evocations of the šajkača cap. After Vukovar's reintegration into Croatia the gravestones were repeatedly vandalized, leading the Serb community in the town to replace them with more neutral gravestones without any overt military connotations. The 1999 NATO bombing of Yugoslavia saw McDonald's chains in Serbia promote their products by distributing posters and lapels which depicted the šajkača standing atop the golden arches of the McDonald's logo in an attempt to bolster Serbian national pride.

The šajkača has been a popular national symbol in Serbia since the beginning of the 20th century. It is commonly worn by elderly men in the Serbian countryside, whereas Serbian youth wear traditional costumes only for folklore concerts.

== Design ==
Designed with a V-shaped top in the form of an overturned chaika, the šajkača is narrow and typically black or grey in colour. It is usually made of soft, homemade cloth and is worn without any symbols during peacetime. During times of war, cockades featuring the Serbian double-headed eagle and the motto Only Unity Saves the Serbs are often seen on the cap. The šajkača worn by Serbian soldiers during World War I had a non-reflecting peak and was topped with a royal monogram.

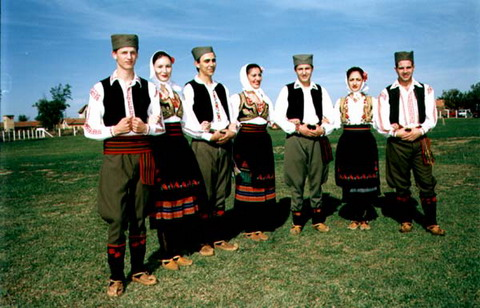
Youths in traditional costumes of Šumadija

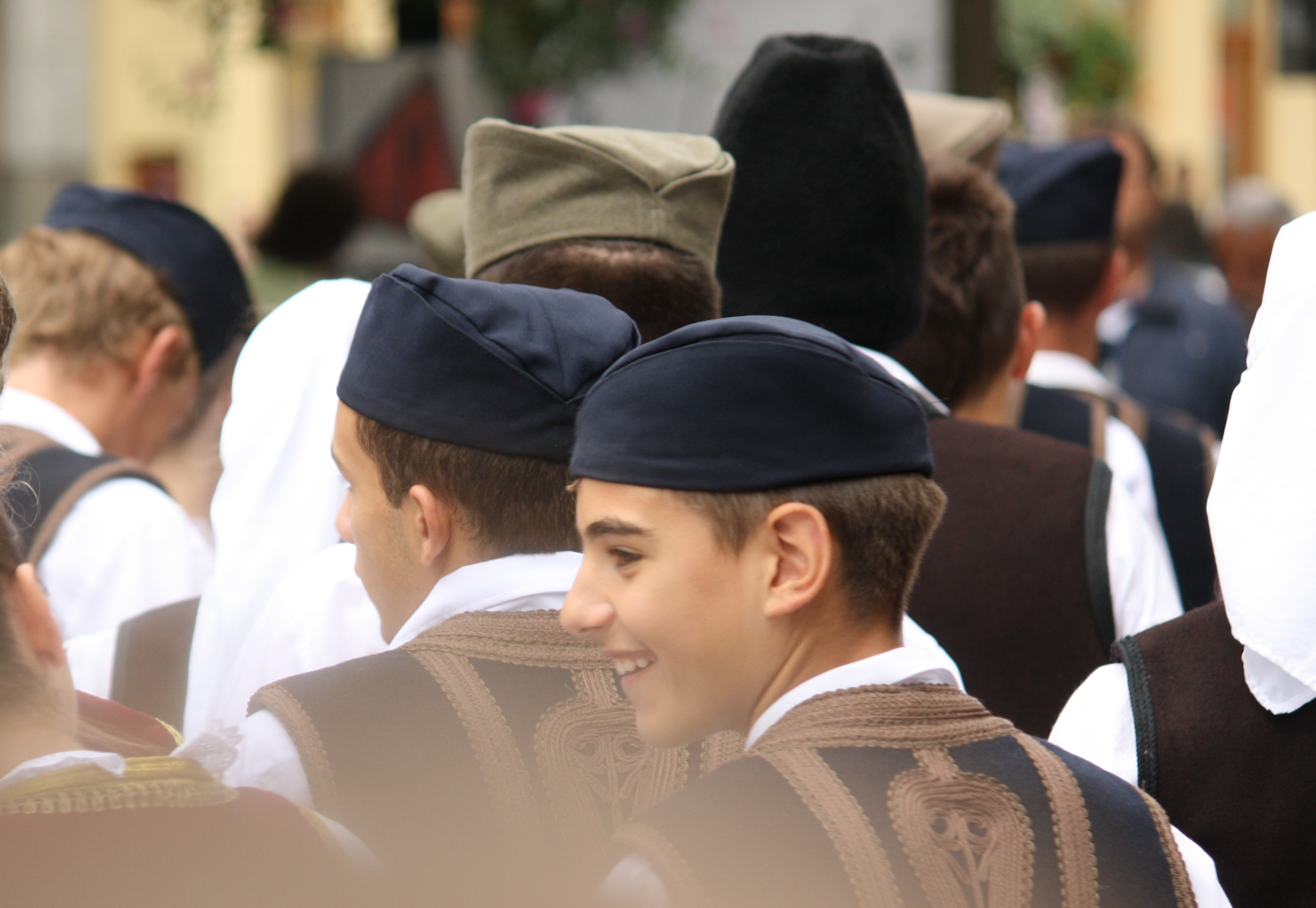
Boys wearing the šajkača

== See also ==
- National symbols of Serbia
- List of hat styles
