= Rajec, Brežice =

Rajec
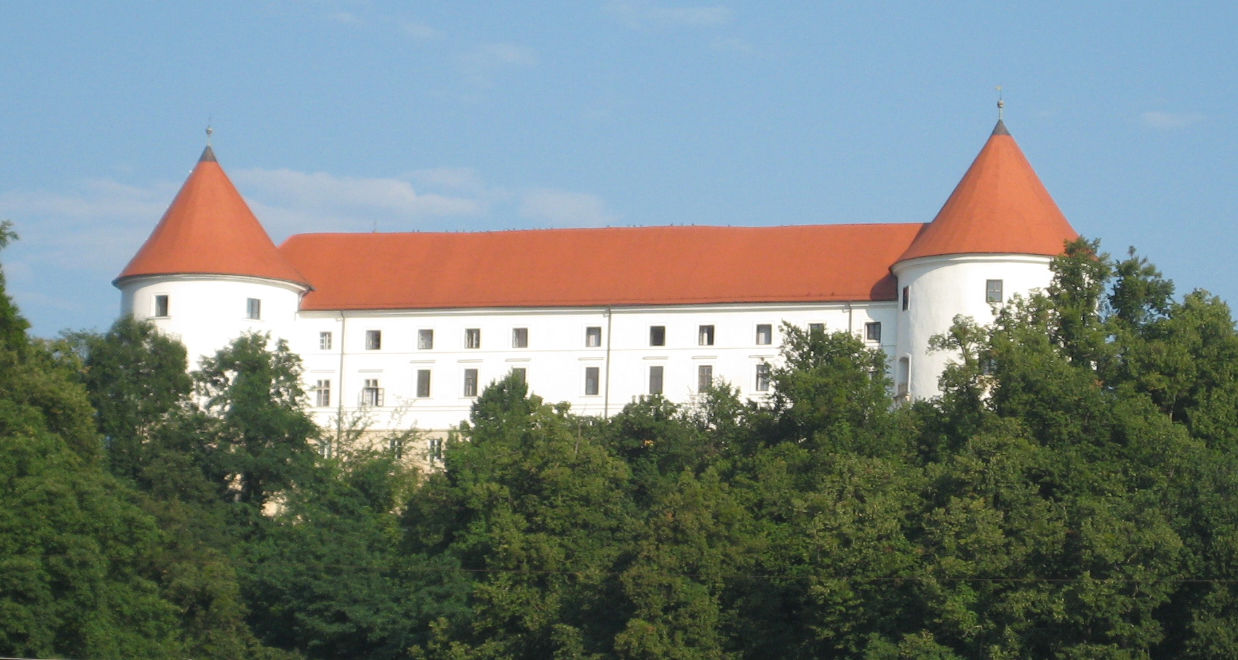

- Location in Slovenia
- Coordinates: 45°50′56.01″N 15°40′32.55″E
- Country: Slovenia
- Traditional region: Lower Carniola
- Statistical region: Lower Sava
- Municipality: Brežice

Area
  - Total: 1.26 km^{2} (0.49 sq mi)
- Elevation: 232.5 m (763 ft)

Population (2020)
  - Total: 69
  - Density: 55/km^{2} (140/sq mi)

Rajec (pronounced [ˈɾaːjəts]) is a settlement in the Municipality of Brežice in eastern Slovenia. The area is part of the traditional region of Lower Carniola. It is now included with the rest of the municipality in the Lower Sava Statistical Region.

== History ==
During the Second World War, Rajec was one of six Slovene settlements (together with Čedem, Jesenice, Nova Vas pri Mokricah, Obrežje, and Slovenska Vas) that were incorporated into the Independent State of Croatia.

== Castle ==
Mokrice Castle is a castle on a hill above the right bank of the Sava River in the northern part of the settlement. It was first mentioned in written documents dating to 1444, but the site has been occupied since Roman times. The castle was rebuilt in 1560 and is a three-storey rectangular building with a central arcaded courtyard and three defence towers. The castle chapel is dedicated to Saint Anne. The building has now been adapted and operates as a four-star hotel.
