= Jesenice, Brežice =

Jesenice
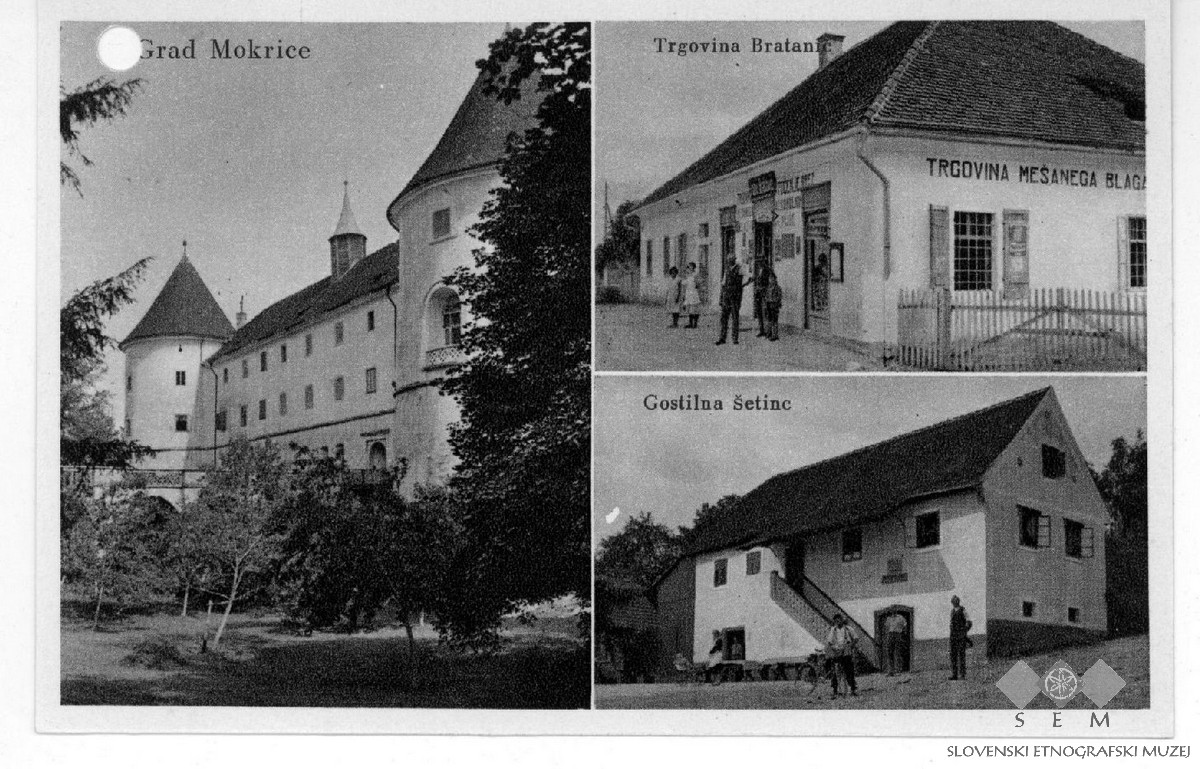
- Postcard of Jesenice

- Location in Slovenia
- Coordinates: 45°51′32.33″N 15°41′26.36″E
- Country: Slovenia
- Traditional region: Lower Carniola
- Statistical region: Lower Sava
- Municipality: Brežice

Area
  - Total: 1.28 km^{2} (0.49 sq mi)
- Elevation: 150 m (490 ft)

Population (2020)
  - Total: 222
  - Density: 173/km^{2} (449/sq mi)

Jesenice (pronounced [jɛsɛˈniːtsɛ]; sometimes also Jesenice na Dolenjskem, German: Jessenitz) is a settlement on the right bank of the Sava River in the Municipality of Brežice in eastern Slovenia, right on the border with Croatia. The area is part of the traditional region of Lower Carniola. It is now included in the Lower Sava Statistical Region.

== History ==
During the Second World War, Jesenice was one of six Slovene settlements (together with Čedem, Nova Vas pri Mokricah, Obrežje, Rajec, and Slovenska Vas) that were incorporated into the Independent State of Croatia.

== Church ==
The local church is dedicated to Mary Magdalene and belongs to the Parish of Velika Dolina. It was built in the mid-16th century. It also contains Mokrice Castle, now run as a hotel and golf course.
