= Triglavka =

Yugoslav partisan cap

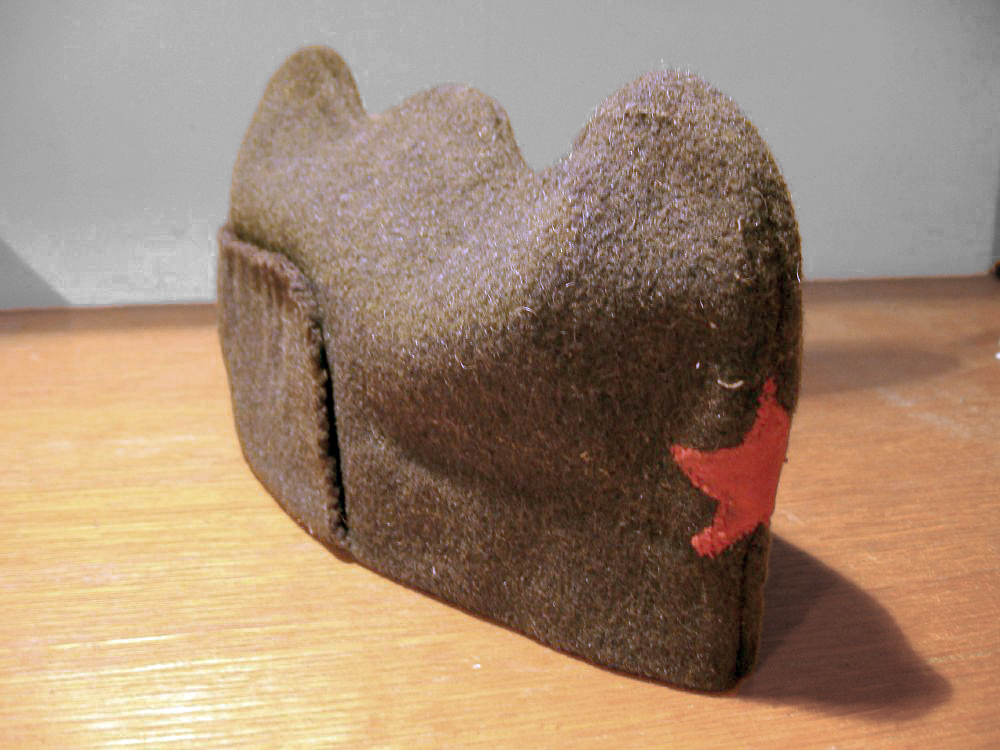
The triglavka or Triglav cap was part of the Yugoslav Partisan uniform in Croatia, Slovenia and western Bosnia. The type with a long edge at the back was the most practical and the majority of the specimens preserved are of this type.

The triglavka or Triglav cap (in Slovenia) or the partizanka or Partizan cap (in Croatia) is a side cap that was a part of the Yugoslav Partisan uniform in Croatia, Slovenia and western Bosnia. There, it was the most characteristic part of Partisan clothing. Despite its common name in Slovenia, the cap's design was not inspired by Mount Triglav, but was a copy of a cap design used by soldiers of the Spanish Republican faction. The first Yugoslav models were made in the second half of 1941 in Zagreb by the Communist Party activist Dobrila Jurić for Vladimir Popović and Otmar Kreačić, former fighters in the International Brigades, and organizers of the Croatian Liberation Front. In occupied Yugoslavia, the cap originated in use among Croatian Partisans in western Yugoslavia, but quickly spread through the Partisan movement, particularly among Slovene Partisans.

The triglavkas were very diverse. In general, there existed four versions of the cap. Initially, they had three prongs, with the two in front and in the back about 10 centimetres (3.9 in) high, and the middle one 14 centimetres (5.5 in) high or somewhat lower. The second version had an about 6 cm (2.4 in) upward bent edge at the back. The third version had the same form as the second, with a shield added at the front. The third version had the edge at the back long enough to be crossed at the top and pinned with a button to the cap. It was very practical, as it allowed for the edge to be rolled down and pinned under the chin, protecting the Partisan against wind and cold. Many of triglavkas were bordered with a red ribbon.

In Slovene Lands, partizankas appeared for the first time in March 1942. They were at first worn by the 3rd Group of Detachments, where they were prescribed with a decree. Then they spread to the Lower Carniola and the White Carniola. in the Upper Carniola, they appeared in late first half of 1942, and in the Slovene Styria, in July 1942. in the Littoral, they appeared in the second half of 1942.

Triglavkas were the initial and the most characteristic element of the uniform of the Slovene Partisans. They were renamed to triglavkas after Mount Triglav, literary meaning "three heads", associated with three major Slavic gods. As the ascent on Triglav via its northern face was connected with the competition between Slovenes and Germans in the 19th century, the triglavka symbolically captured the primary drive for the Slovene resistance to the Fascist and Nazi armies, a national liberation. Since June 1943, it was quickly replaced with the titovka, particularly after a decree about caps in April 1944. Few specimens have been preserved, the majority of them being of the third type. Of the first type, only one specimen has been preserved, and of the second type, none have been preserved.

The partisans treated their caps with reverence. According to Savo Zlatić, losing one's cap was considered a disgrace on par with losing one's weapon.

Triglavka was used as a cue for the article Triglav from under Triglavka (Slovene: Triglav izpod Triglavke), written by France Avčin, a Partisan and the first post-war president of the Alpine Association of Slovenia. It was published in 1980 in Planinski Vestnik ("Alpine Gazette").

== See also ==
- Titovka
