= Titovka (cap) =

Yugoslav side cap

Titovka

The Titovka (Cyrillic: Титовка) was a style of side cap characteristic of the anti-fascist Yugoslav Partisans during World War II, and later the Yugoslav People's Army (JNA), hence known as the JNA cap.

It was based on the Russian pilotka, usually made out of khaki or blue wool and often had the red star badge on the front, either made out of red felt or embroidery, or an enamelled red star with hammer and sickle. It was named after Josip Broz Tito, the Partisan leader (and later President of Yugoslavia), by the Union of Pioneers of Yugoslavia.

== See also ==
- Triglavka, Partisan cap
- Šajkača, Serbian cap
- Forage cap, similar styles
- Kozarčanka
