= Velika Dolina =

- Village
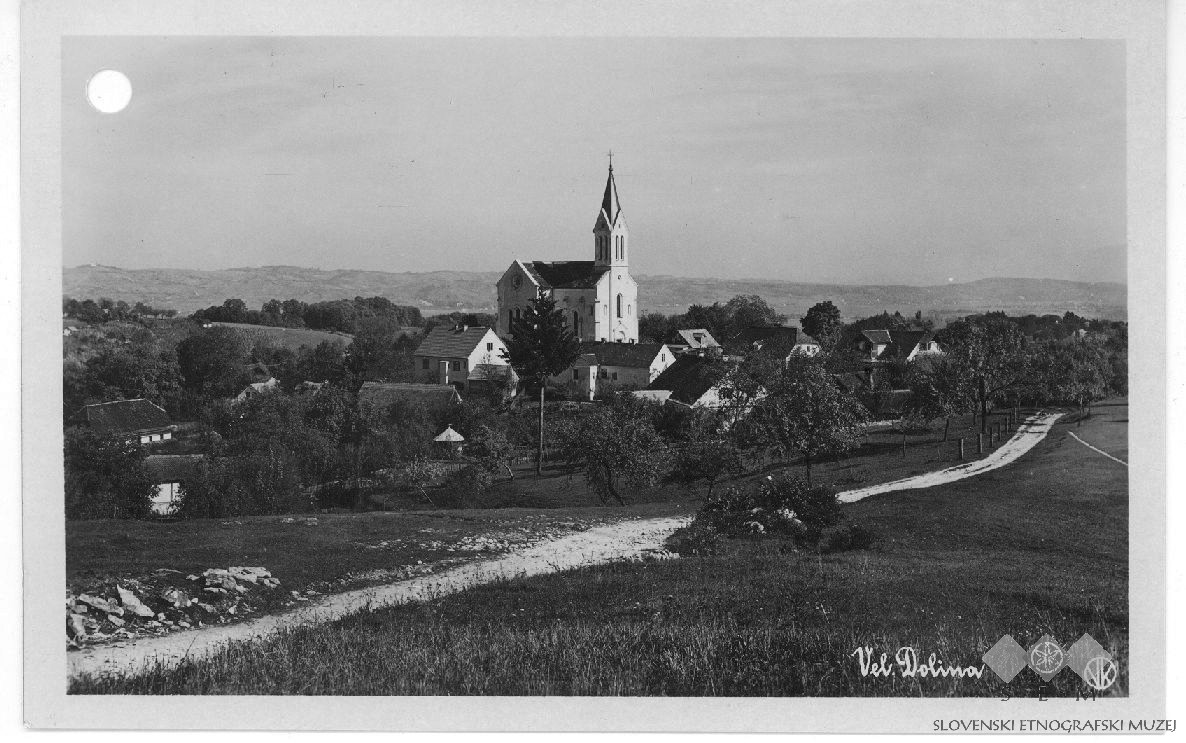
- Postcard of Velika Dolina

- Location in Slovenia
- Coordinates: 45°51′16.07″N 15°39′42.27″E
- Country: Slovenia
- Traditional region: Lower Carniola
- Statistical region: Lower Sava
- Municipality: Brežice

Area
  - Total: 0.68 km^{2} (0.26 sq mi)
- Elevation: 250.7 m (823 ft)

Population (2020)
  - Total: 139
  - Density: 200/km^{2} (530/sq mi)

Velika Dolina (pronounced [ˈʋeːlika ˈdoːlina]; German: Großdolina) (literally, 'big valley') is a village in the Municipality of Brežice in eastern Slovenia. The area is part of the traditional region of Lower Carniola. It is now included with the rest of the municipality in the Lower Sava Statistical Region.

The parish church in the settlement is dedicated to the Assumption of Mary and belongs to the Roman Catholic Diocese of Novo Mesto. It was built in 1885 on the site of an earlier church.
