= Obrežje, Brežice =

Obrežje
- Location in Slovenia
- Coordinates: 45°53′59.1″N 15°39′26.11″E
- Country: Slovenia
- Traditional region: Lower Carniola
- Statistical region: Lower Sava
- Municipality: Brežice

Area
  - Total: 1.64 km^{2} (0.63 sq mi)
- Elevation: 143.8 m (472 ft)

Population (2020)
  - Total: 354
  - Density: 216/km^{2} (559/sq mi)

Obrežje (pronounced [ɔˈbɾeːʒjɛ]) is a settlement in the Municipality of Brežice in eastern Slovenia, close to the border with Croatia. The area is part of the traditional region of Lower Carniola. It is now included with the rest of the municipality in the Lower Sava Statistical Region.

== History ==
During the Second World War, Obrežje was one of six Slovene settlements (together with Čedem, Jesenice, Nova Vas pri Mokricah, Rajec, and Slovenska Vas) that were incorporated into the Independent State of Croatia.

== Border crossing ==
A major motorway border crossing is located here. Obrežje is the end/start of Slovenia's A2 motorway. It connects to Croatia's A3 Motorway. Both motorways form part of the European route E70. The Croatian settlement across the border is Bregana, part of the town of Samobor. From 21 December 2007, when Slovenia became part of the Schengen area, until 1 January 2023, when Croatia joined the Schengen area, the Obrežje–Bregana border crossing was a Schengen external crossing.

== Events ==
In February 2010, Obrežje featured as the finish point in a four-day winter ultramarathon that started in Rateče, 220 km (140 mi) away.
