= Čedem =

- Location in Slovenia
- Coordinates: 45°50′39.19″N 15°33′31.04″E
- Country: Slovenia
- Traditional region: Lower Carniola
- Statistical region: Lower Sava
- Municipality: Brežice

Area
  - Total: 0.83 km^{2} (0.32 sq mi)
- Elevation: 366.1 m (1,201 ft)

Population (2020)
  - Total: 11
  - Density: 13/km^{2} (34/sq mi)

Čedem (pronounced [ˈtʃeːdəm], in older sources also Čedno) is a small settlement in the eastern Gorjanci Mountains in the Municipality of Brežice in eastern Slovenia, right on the border with Croatia. The area is part of the traditional region of Lower Carniola. It is now included with the rest of the municipality in the Lower Sava Statistical Region.

== History ==
During the Second World War, Čedem was one of six Slovene settlements (together with Jesenice, Nova Vas pri Mokricah, Obrežje, Rajec, and Slovenska Vas) that were incorporated into the Independent State of Croatia.

== Cultural heritage ==
The village is protected as a national heritage monument by the Slovenian Ministry of Culture. Single-storey rectangular wooden houses with a variety of outbuildings such as sties, hayracks, and granaries all date to the late 19th and early 20th centuries. The exteriors of the houses are painted blue, ochre, or brown.
