= Slovenska Vas, Brežice =

Slovenska Vas Bregansko Selo (until 1993)
- Location in Slovenia
- Coordinates: 45°50′29.69″N 15°39′52.84″E
- Country: Slovenia
- Traditional region: Lower Carniola
- Statistical region: Lower Sava
- Municipality: Brežice

Area
  - Total: 2.05 km^{2} (0.79 sq mi)
- Elevation: 162.6 m (533 ft)

Population (2020)
  - Total: 185
  - Density: 90.2/km^{2} (234/sq mi)

Slovenska Vas (pronounced [slɔˈʋeːnska ˈʋaːs]; Slovene: Slovenska vas) is a settlement in the Municipality of Brežice in eastern Slovenia, next to the border with Croatia. The area is part of the traditional region of Lower Carniola. It is now included with the rest of the municipality in the Lower Sava Statistical Region.

== Name ==
The name of the settlement was changed from Bregansko selo to Slovenska vas in 1993.

== History ==
During the Second World War, when it was known as Bregansko selo, Slovenska Vas was one of six Slovene settlements (together with Čedem, Jesenice, Nova Vas pri Mokricah, Obrežje, and Rajec) that were incorporated into the Independent State of Croatia.
