= Nova Vas pri Mokricah =

Settlement in the Municipality of Brežice, Slovenia

Nova Vas pri Mokricah Nova Vas pri Bregani (until 1993)
- Location in Slovenia
- Coordinates: 45°50′50.41″N 15°40′49.64″E
- Country: Slovenia
- Traditional region: Lower Carniola
- Statistical region: Lower Sava
- Municipality: Brežice

Area
  - Total: 0.4 km^{2} (0.15 sq mi)
- Elevation: 169.5 m (556 ft)

Population (2020)
  - Total: 211
  - Density: 530/km^{2} (1,400/sq mi)

Nova Vas pri Mokricah (pronounced [ˈnoːʋa ˈʋaːs pɾi mɔˈkɾiːtsax]; Slovene: Nova vas pri Mokricah, German: Neudorf) is a settlement in the Municipality of Brežice in eastern Slovenia, close to the border with Croatia. The area is part of the traditional region of Lower Carniola. It is now included with the rest of the municipality in the Lower Sava Statistical Region.

== Name ==
The name of the settlement was changed from Nova vas pri Bregani to Nova vas pri Mokricah in 1993. In the past the German name was Neudorf.

== History ==
During the Second World War, when it was known as Nova vas pri Bregani, Nova Vas pri Mokricah was one of six Slovene settlements (together with Čedem, Jesenice, Obrežje, Rajec, and Slovenska Vas) that were incorporated into the Independent State of Croatia.
