= Dolomite Declaration =

Slovenian declaration

The Dolomite Declaration (Slovene: Dolomitska izjava), signed on March 1, 1943, marked the transition of the Liberation Front of the Slovenian People from political pluralism to political exclusivism, which was a prelude to the tactics used by the KPS during and after the war to gain absolute power.
