= Podvinje =

Podvinje may refer to:

- Podvinje, Visoko, a village near Visoko, Bosnia and Herzegovina
- Podvinje, Croatia, a village near Slavonski Brod, Croatia
  - Podvinje cafe shooting, 1998
- Podvinje, Slovenia, a village near Brežice, Slovenia
