= Podvinje cafe shooting =

1998 shooting in Croatia

- Location: Podvinje, Slavonski Brod, Brod-Posavina County, Croatia
- Date: April 14, 1998 c. 10 p.m. (CEST)
- Attack type: Mass murder, mass shooting, murder-suicide
- Weapons: 7.62×39mm Kalashnikov Assault rifle , Pistol; IED
- Deaths: 8 (including the perpetrator)
- Injuries: 1
- Perpetrator: Antun Matajić
- Motive: Inconclusive

On April 14, 1998 a Mass shooting occurred at about 10 p.m., when 50-year-old Antun Matajić shot and killed 7 people and wounded one other person at the Trenk cafe in Podvinje, Croatia, before driving to a shooting range and committing suicide.

== Shooting ==
On April 13, 1998, at 7 p.m, Antun Mataić and an unspecified friend went to the Trenk cafe in Podvinje which was owned by his father in-law "Nikola Orešković", both of them stayed there for a short time, drank and left. At Around 10 p.m. Antun returned to the cafe by himself, In the cafe there were 9 guests, a waitress and the cafe owner, Antun ordered a Cognac, after he paid for the cognac and left it half full, he left the bar.

When Antun left he went to his car (a Zastava 750) which was parked in front of the bar and subsequently returned to the cafe with a Kalashnikov rifle. When guest Ivica Sabljak saw him enter with the rifle he said, "Tunja, this is not right," Matajić responded, "And it's not going to be right". After Antun started firing, the guests fell to the ground, and attempted to shield their faces by covering them with their hands. After Antun empited the gun magazine, He started firing from a pistol at each victim lying on the ground, killing Tomislav Farkaš (23), Ilija Odobašić (24), Ivana Vrdoljak (41), Ivica Sabljak (35), Marijan Špehar (17), Pave Barišić (23) and waitress Gordan Lesar (22). 17 year-old Marijan Špehar, was also his brother in-law

The owner of the bar and one of the guests rushed to the ground in time and were able to escape. After the shooting, he got in the car and drove west. On the way he went to a cafe, ordered cognac and said I have just killed eight people". 2 hours later, Antun then went to a shooting range, which is located near lake Petnja, where he blew his car up and shot himself shortly thereafter.

== Perpetrator ==
Antun Matajić (50) lived in Završje, at the time of the attack. He lwas a veteran of the Croatian War of Independence, and subsequently lost his family during the war. Antun's Neighbours and acquaintances noted that in the months leading up to the attack, Mataić repeatedly expressed feelings that his life had lost all meaning and stated he planned to spend all his money and take his own life, Antun sold his house and later bought a smaller house in order to use the leftover money for fun. Antun was noted to be a frequent visitor of the Trenk café, he was popular enough to be given the nickname "Tunja".

Antun's son-in-law Ivica Kovačević and his father-in-law Nikola Orešković who owned the building housing the Trenk café described Matajić as a 'strange man' who was particularly volatile and 'bad when drinking.' Matajić had been separated from his wife for about a year prior to the shooting and had spoken for up to three years about his intent to harm himself and possessing "the tools" to do so.

== See also ==
- 1994 Osijek café shooting
- Zrinski Topolovac shooting
