= Branko Ružić =

Branko Ružić may refer to:

- Branko Ružić (sculptor) (1919–1997), Croatian sculptor
- Branko Ružić (politician) (born 1975), Serbian politician
