= Podvinje, Brežice =

Podvinje
- Location in Slovenia
- Coordinates: 45°55′30.83″N 15°40′11.3″E
- Country: Slovenia
- Traditional region: Styria
- Statistical region: Lower Sava
- Municipality: Brežice

Area
  - Total: 1.66 km^{2} (0.64 sq mi)
- Elevation: 203.4 m (667 ft)

Population (2020)
  - Total: 113
  - Density: 68.1/km^{2} (176/sq mi)

Podvinje (pronounced [pɔˈdʋiːnjɛ], German: Podvine) is a village north of Dobova in the Municipality of Brežice in eastern Slovenia, close to the border with Croatia. The area is part of the traditional region of Styria. It is now included in the Lower Sava Statistical Region. The Jovsi wetland lies east of the village.

== Church ==
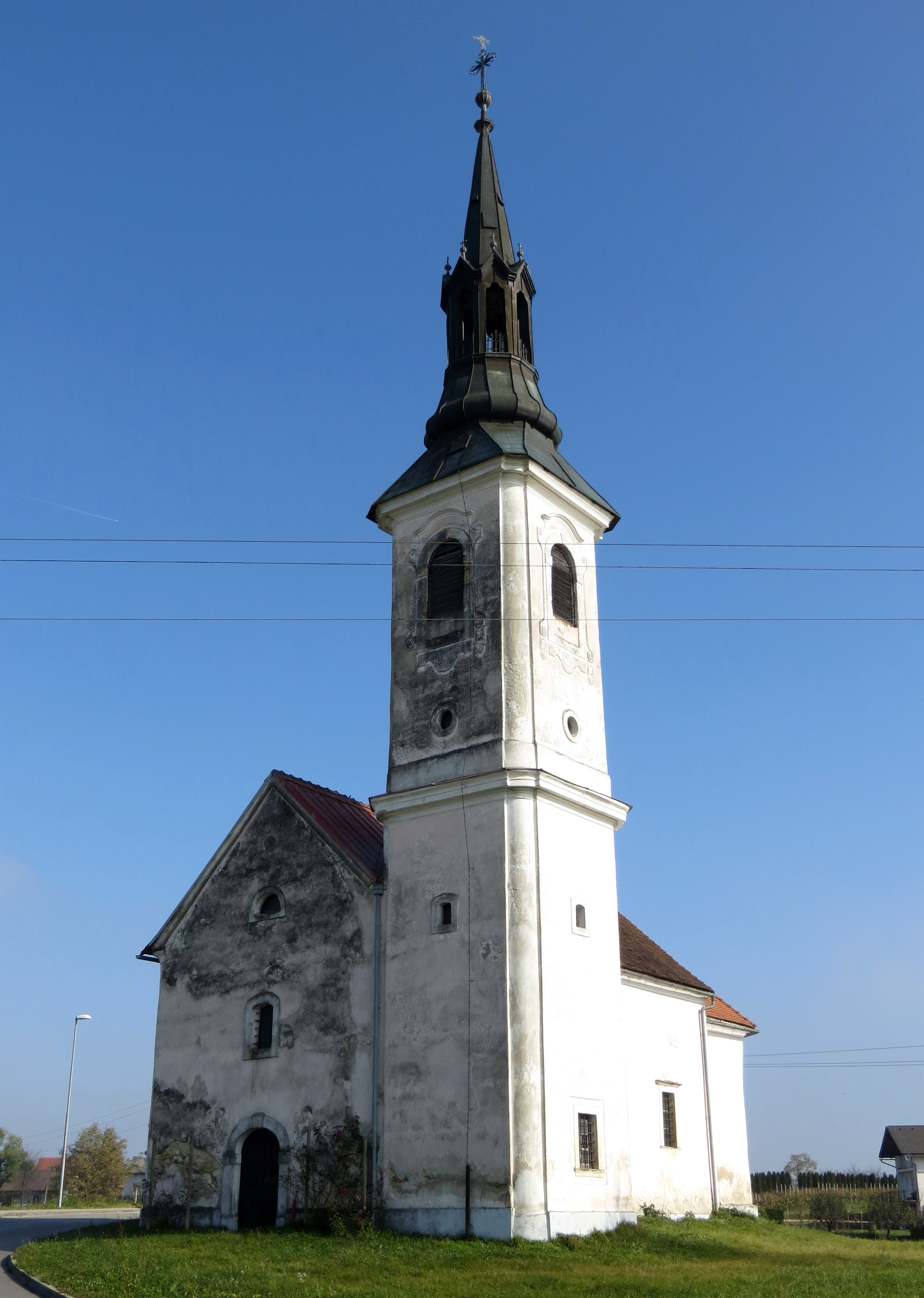
Holy Trinity Church

The local church is dedicated to the Holy Trinity and belongs to the Parish of Kapele. It is a single-naved building with a three-sided sanctuary built in the 17th century. In the 18th century it was vaulted and the bell tower was built in 1776.
