= 1994 Osijek café shooting =

Mass shooting in Osijek, Croatia

- Location: Osijek, Osijek-Baranja County, Croatia
- Date: 18 June 1994
- Attack type: Mass shooting; mass murder
- Weapon: 7.62 caliber automatic rifle
- Deaths: 4
- Injuries: 8
- Perpetrator: Borislav Bešlić
- Motive: Displeasure and disdain of hearing Serbian folk music

On 18 June 1994, a mass shooting occurred at the Grafičar bar in Osijek, Osijek-Baranja County, Croatia, when 41-year-old soldier Borislav Bešlić shot and killed four people and wounded eight others.

== Shooting ==
On the evening of 18 June 1994 in Osijek, Borislav Bešlić returned from the front with an automatic rifle. He went to the café Grafičar. However, the owner closed the gate since there were two groups of people inside, one celebrating the anniversary of graduation. Bešlić ignored the man and entered by climbing through the gate. The celebration was in full swing and the musicians "Mister X" played two Serbian folk songs.

These songs reportedly angered Bešlić and he started firing, The guests on the terrace only realized what had happened later. It was reported that they did not react when they heard the shots because they had thought that someone was firing into the air to celebrate, which was a common practice in the Balkans. Belišić first fired through a closed glass door, and then went to the center of the café and continued firing, He killed two waitresses Melita Grujic and Mirjana Katanic and two guests Branko Malijurek and Tihomir Milicevic, and injured eight other people. The four victims were reportedly lying in a pool of their own blood.

Afterwards Belišić sat down at a table and put his weapons down. He immediately surrendered to the police once they entered the building, during the shooting Belišić fired a total of 45 bullets.

== Perpetrator ==
Borislav Bešlić (41) was a member of the fifth Home Guard Regiment of Croatia. The commander of his regiment remained silent to the public and could not explain how he had taken the automatic weapon with him. Earlier, he had been convicted of endangering the general public for setting fire to the "Fruska Gora," a restaurant in Osijek.

== See also ==
- Podvinje cafe shooting
