= Kapele, Brežice =

Kapele
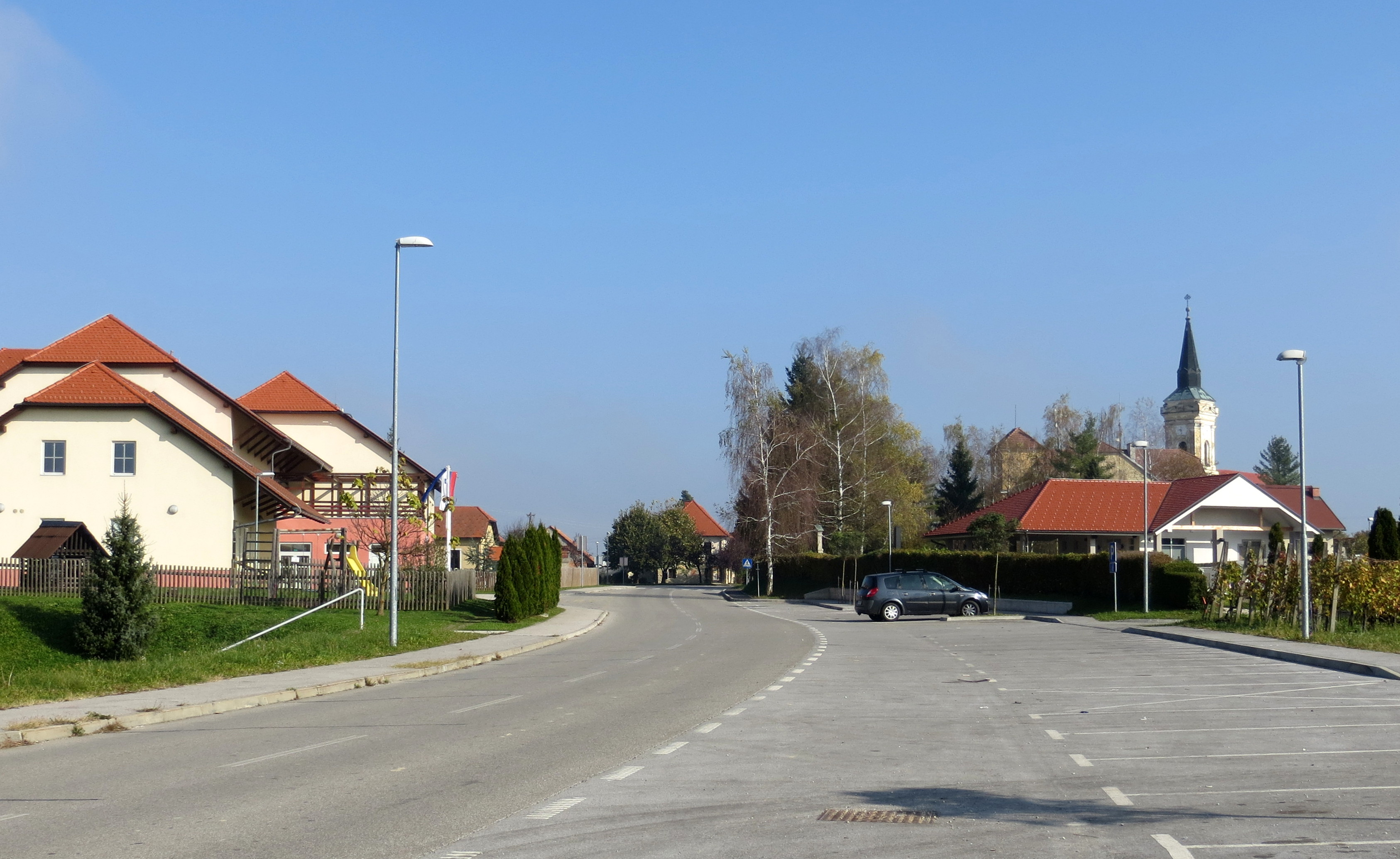

- Location in Slovenia
- Coordinates: 45°55′52.67″N 15°40′43.13″E
- Country: Slovenia
- Traditional region: Styria
- Statistical region: Lower Sava
- Municipality: Brežice

Area
  - Total: 2.03 km^{2} (0.78 sq mi)
- Elevation: 219.6 m (720 ft)

Population (2020)
  - Total: 218
  - Density: 107/km^{2} (278/sq mi)

Kapele (pronounced [kaˈpeːlɛ], German: Kapellen) is a village in the Municipality of Brežice in eastern Slovenia, close to the border with Croatia. The area is part of the traditional region of Styria. It is now included in the Lower Sava Statistical Region. The village was first mentioned in written documents dating to 1249. The village core is concentrated around the village square, dominated by the parish church and also including the local school, the rectory, two inns, and a village fire station. The Jovsi wetland lies east of the village.

== History ==
Kapele formerly contained many houses painted red, which folk tradition said served as protection against Ottoman attacks. A school was established in the village in 1824. There was extensive viticulture on the hillside next to the Kapele until the Phylloxera epidemic reached the area in 1881. In the fall of 1941, the German authorities evicted 184 residents of the village in order to resettle Gottschee Germans.

== Architecture ==
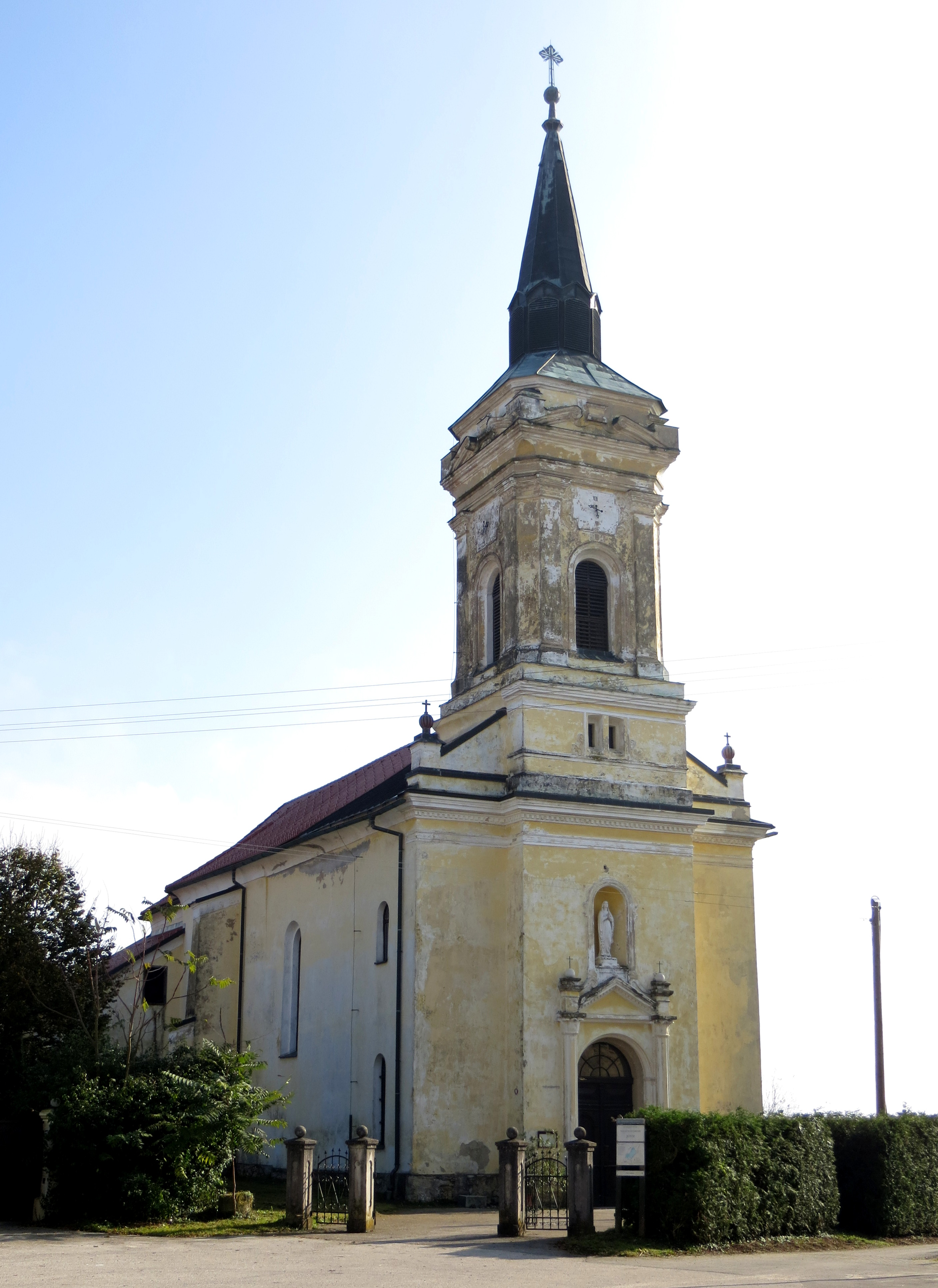
Assumption Church

The parish church in the settlement is dedicated to the Assumption of Mary and belongs to the Roman Catholic Diocese of Celje. It was built in 1798 on the site of an earlier building. The belfry dates to 1884. It was badly damaged in the 1895 Ljubljana earthquake and was rebuilt in 1906, when its interior was also decorated with wall paintings. The church was originally Baroque in style and has a richly decorated portal and facade. The nave and chancel are dome-vaulted. In 1901 the church was extended to the west and newly furnished and painted. Part of the baptismal font bearing the year 1601 is preserved.

There is also a chapel belonging to the same parish in the village. It is dedicated to the Holy Cross.

== Music ==
The local concert band has been active ever since its foundation in 1850, making it one of the oldest concert bands in Slovenia. With its 56 members it has participated in numerous international competitions, released CDs of its music, and performed for local and national television.
