= Branko Ružić (sculptor) =

Croatian painter, sculptor (1919–1997)

- Born: Branko Ružić; 4 March 1919; Slavonski Brod, Croatia
- Died: 27 November 1997 (aged 78); Zagreb, Croatia
- Education: Academy of Fine Arts, Zagreb
- Known for: Painting, Sculpture
- Notable work: "Gypsies", "Father", "Alone", "Round table", "Cats"

Branko Ružić (4 March 1919 – 27 November 1997) was a prominent Croatian painter, sculptor and professor at the Academy of Fine Arts, Zagreb.

== Early days ==
Branko Ružić was born in Slavonski Brod to Katarina (born Blažeković) and Antun Ružić, as the youngest of four children. When he was six years old his parents moved him to Vinkovci where he started school. Ružić showed a passion and skill for drawing from an early age and by the time he was in secondary school, he was already recognized by his art teacher who used to take him, along with his more advanced colleagues (one of them was painter Slavko Kopač), to paint in the open air.

After secondary school, Ružić has attended a few universities before he eventually entered the Academy of Fine Arts to study sculpture in 1940. He graduated under Ivo Lozica and Frano Kršinić in 1944. Although he already had a degree in sculpture he began a four–year painting course in professor Marino Tartaglia's class. He acquired a degree in painting in 1948 and soon after began to exhibit his works. In 1951 Ružić mounted his first solo exhibition of paintings in Vinkovci City Museum.

In the next couple of years he successfully participated in numerous exhibitions (including in Lyon and Bern), but soon found painting to be less and less fulfilling. Eventually Ružić completely abandoned painting so he could dedicate himself to sculpting, although he returned to painting later in his career.

In 1956 he sculpted the head "Father", which he considered his first piece of sculpture. In 1959 he held his first solo exhibition of sculptures at the ULUH (Society of Croatian Artists) salon in Zagreb.

== Work, career and awards ==
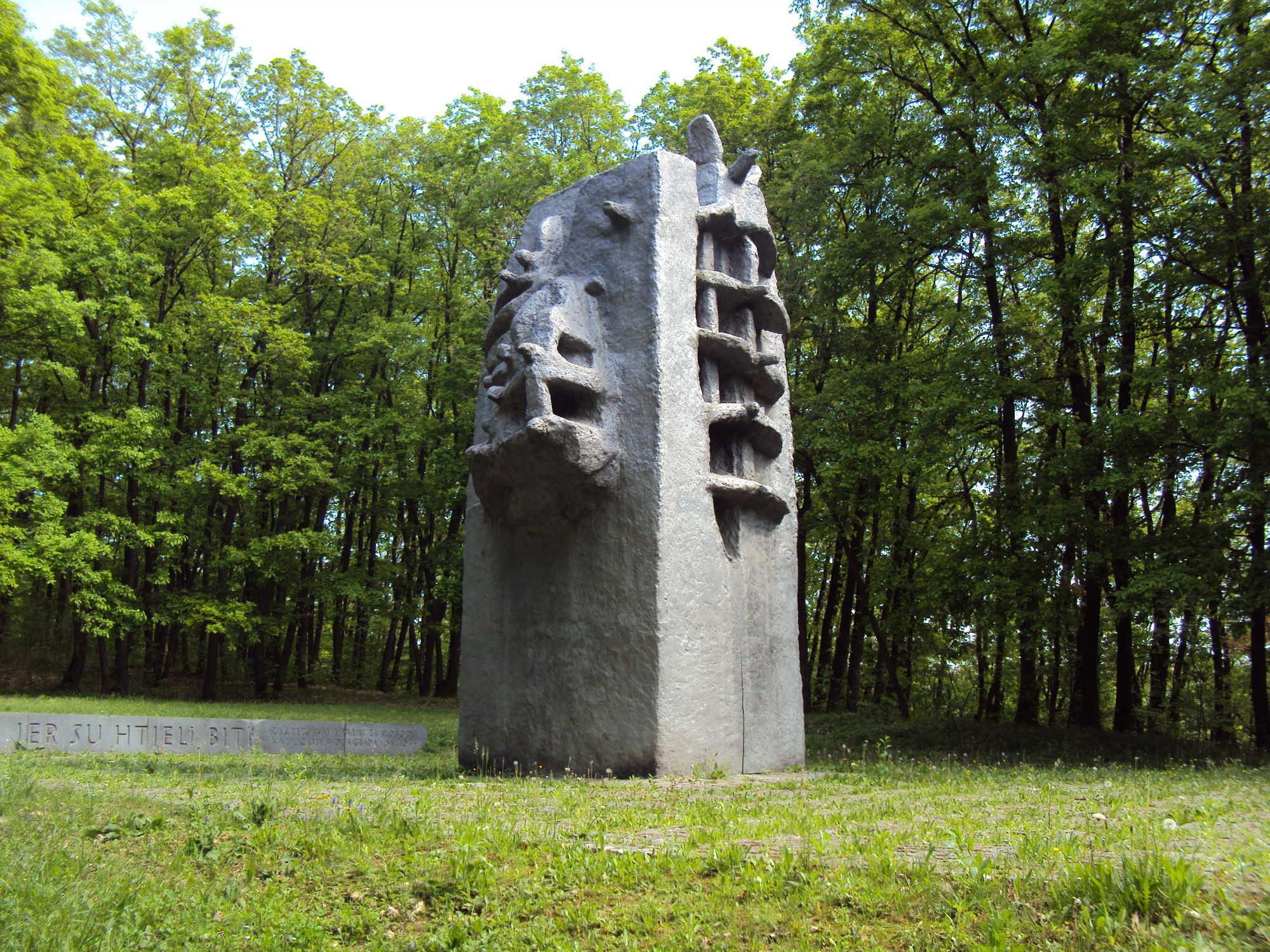
Branko Ružić, "Memorial to people of Zagreb who fell 1941-1945", Dotrščina, Zagreb, Croatia, 1981

Ružić was known for his famous statement „Everything is a sculpture“. He made his sculptures in various techniques including wood, bronze, plaster of Paris, copper plate, terracotta, stone and paper. With his condensed forms, suggestive profiling and architectural volumes in which he overcomes the general over the individual he joined the trend of renewal in Croatian sculpture in the 1950s. The motifs of Ružić's sculptures are varied: figures, portraits, sequences, groups, motifs from nature. His works are characterized by simplicity and monumentality, and sometimes by specific deformations that carry a strain of humor and irony.

In his career Ružić held more than one hundred solo and two hundred collective exhibitions in Croatia and abroad. He won many recognitions and awards such as Rovinj Municipality Award (1967, 1972), City of Zagreb Award (1968), Vladimir Nazor Annual Award (1973), First prize at the Concorso Archettilegnani, Madonna di Campiglio (1988), Grand Prix at the 3rd Triennale of Croatian Sculpture, Zagreb (1988), Grand Prix Grisie, Rovinj (1989) and Vladimir Nazor Award for lifetime achievement (1985). In 1964 Ružić exhibited his sculpture at the 32nd. Venice Biennale where an international jury awarded his work with the prize for sculpture from the "David Bright Foundation", which makes him the only Croat ever to win a prize at the Venice Biennale. His works are exhibited at many galleries and museums but most of his opus stayed within his family and the Ružić gallery in Slavonski Brod.

Ružić also wrote about his views and experience in working with children in the book „Children drawing“ (1958). From 1961 to 1985 he was professor in sculpture at Academy of Fine Arts, Zagreb.

== The Ružić gallery ==
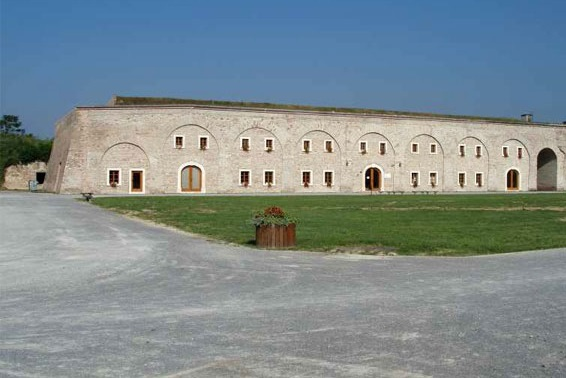
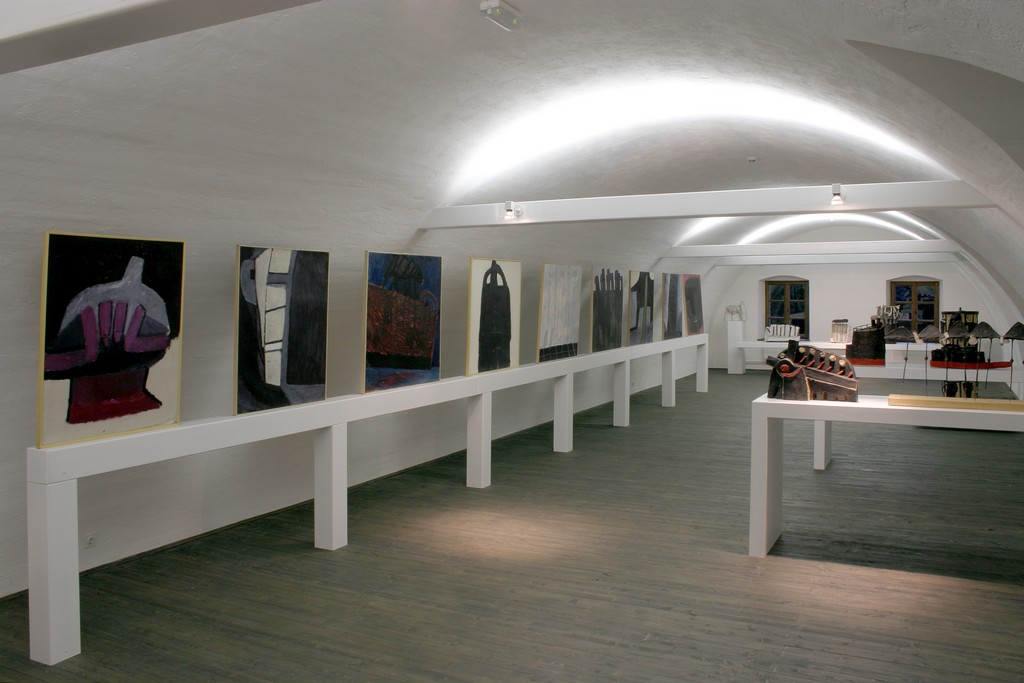
Slavonski Brod Fortress

In 1993 the authorities of the city of Slavonski Brod and Branko Ružić (and his wife Julia) signed an agreement concerning donation of 410 works and archives of the artist. Also, on Ružić’s call, more than a hundred renowned Croatian painters and sculptors gave of their works for this collection, which makes it the first permanent exhibition of the Croatian modern art of the second half of the 20th century. Diminić, Radovani, Petrić, Džamonja, Srnec, Picelj, Richter, Bourek, Lončarić, Lesiak, Lipovac, Babić, Šebalj, Biffel, Hegedušić, Keser, Kožarić, Drinković, Jordan, Kinert, Parać, Šutej, Labaš, Murtić, Popović are just some of the names presented. The gallery is situated within the Brod Fortress, in the renovated part of the southwestern tract of the Cavalier, on the gross area of 1.800 sq. metres. The Ružić gallery was officially opened on 15 June 2004.
