= Brod Fortress =

Coordinates: 45°9′23″N 18°0′24″E

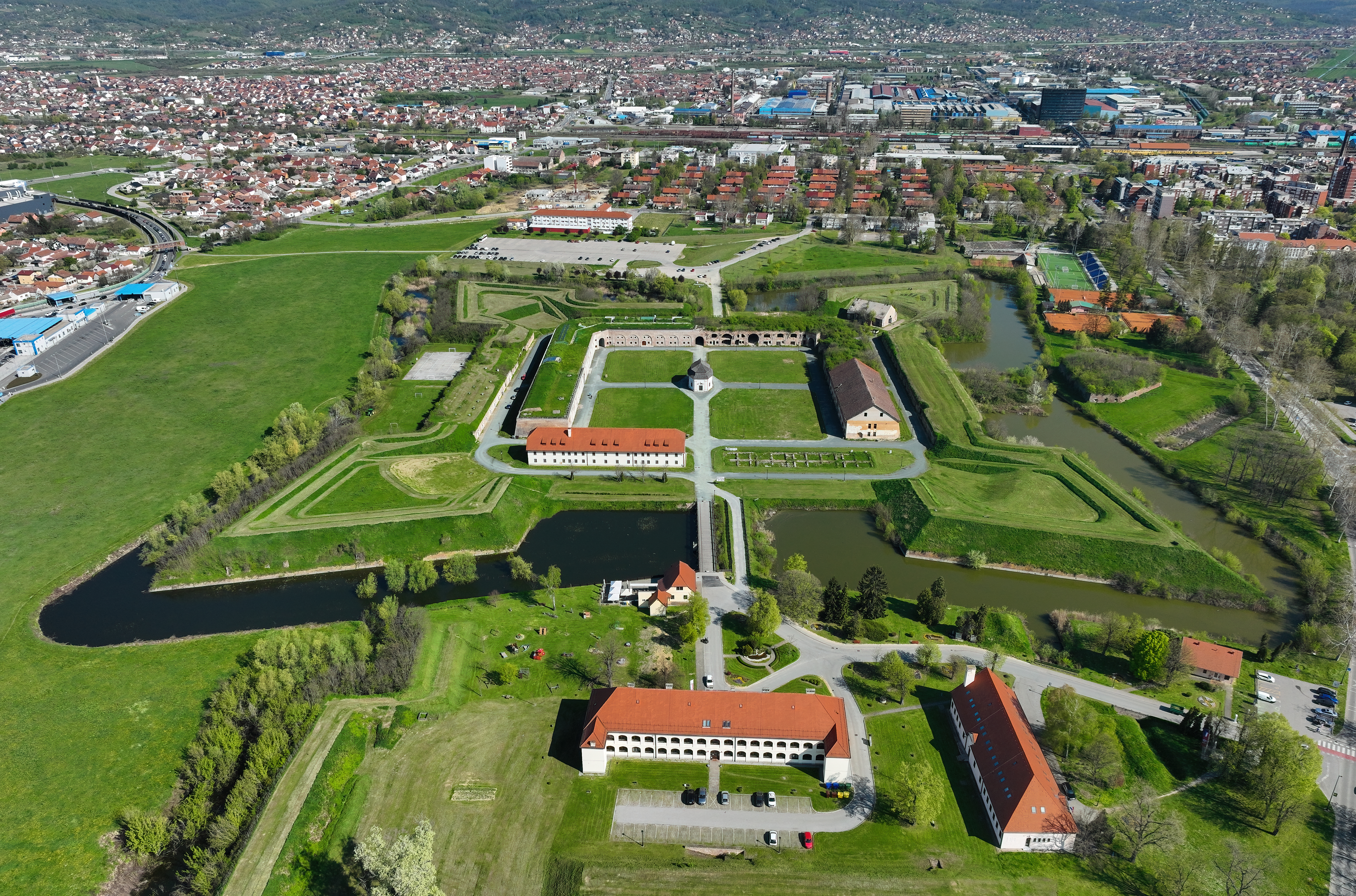

The Fortress of Brod is a fortress in Slavonski Brod, Croatia with significant cultural heritage. The fortress was constructed in the 18th century by the Archduchy of Austria to create a defense against the Ottoman Empire.

== History ==
The city of Slavonski Brod, Croatia was an important strategic and traffic center controlling the border crossing towards Turkey and connecting main commercial trails at the time. In the period between 1715 and 1780 Austria built the large imperial and royal border Fortress of Brod on the Sava River. Along with the fortified baroque towns of Slavonia, Osijek and Stara Gradiška, it belongs to the great defense system on the border towards the Turkish Empire, designed by Prince Eugene of Savoy in the first half of the 18th century. It was constructed by peasants of the Military Border under forced labor more specifically 634 a day, who also gave 53 horse-drawn carts daily for the transport of material. The regular star-like form of the fortress was determined by the flat-country. It was built of rammed earth, bricks, wood and partially stone, and designed to accommodate 4,000 soldiers, mostly infantry and 150 cannons.

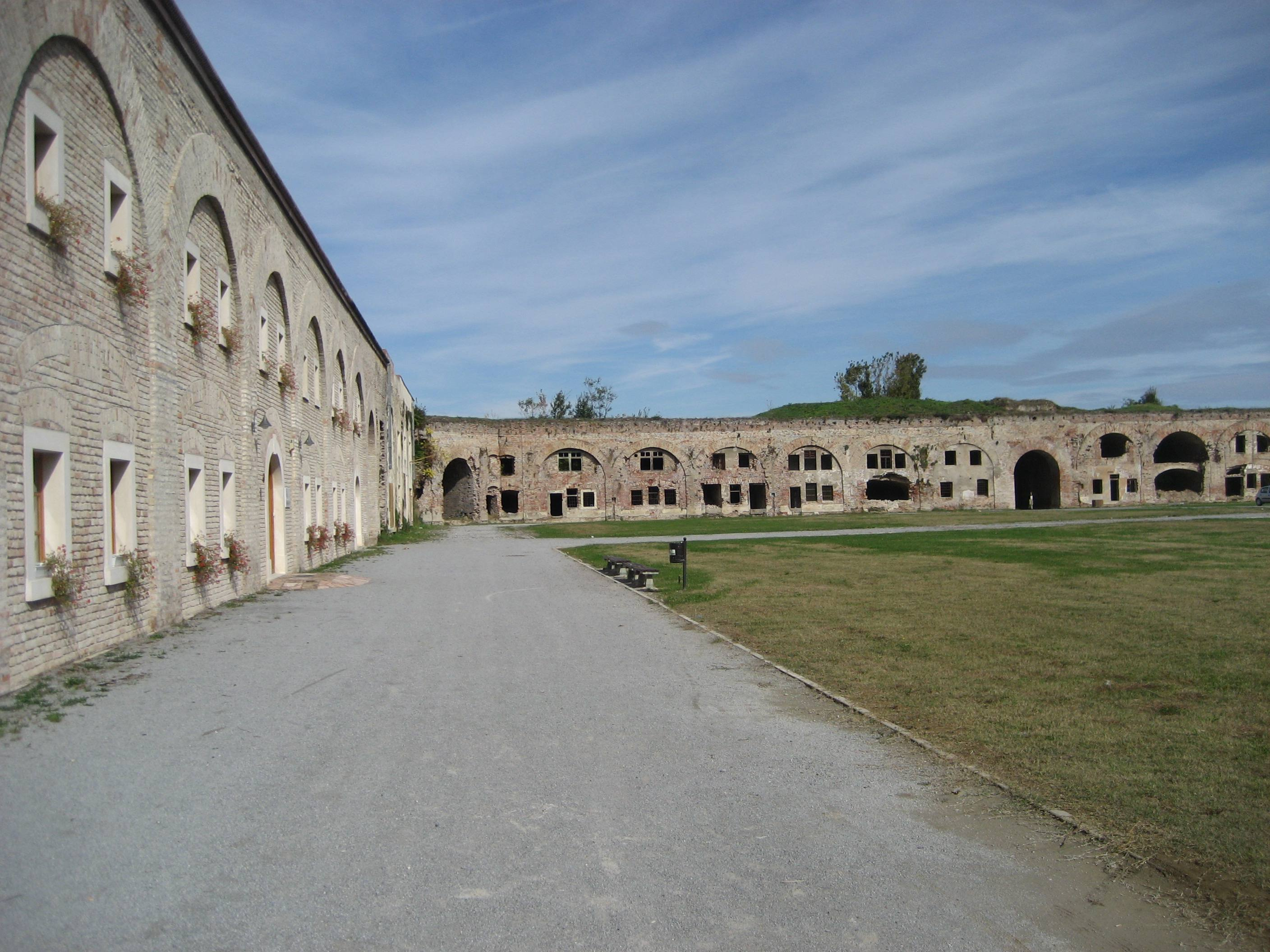
Fortress Brod

According to an evaluation of the Brod Fortress resistance, during the classical siege with full capacity channels, it would have taken 10 days of preparation for the attacks and 46 days for the enemy to take over the entire Fortress. The Fortress of Brod occupied about 33 hectares (82 acres). The military government did not allow for the construction of solid material houses, because the entire town was within the range of the fortress cannons. Consequently, throughout the entire 18th and most of the 19th century, Brod was the town of small wooden houses, roofed by shingle or board. In case of the potential Turkish attack, the town was to be leveled down, in order to provide the artillery with the open space around the fortress. Although being a military border stronghold, the Fortress almost never had the opportunity to prove and demonstrate its combative power. However, there are many preserved fortifications reminiscent of the bygone times and the everyday military life that took place within. The Fortress of Brod was constructed according to the Vauban system. It is basically of a rectangular form, while the system of defense channels provides its star-like layout. It consisted of three defense zones: internal, external and southern, and it was protected by two moat areas, water-fed from the nearby stream.

== The southern part ==
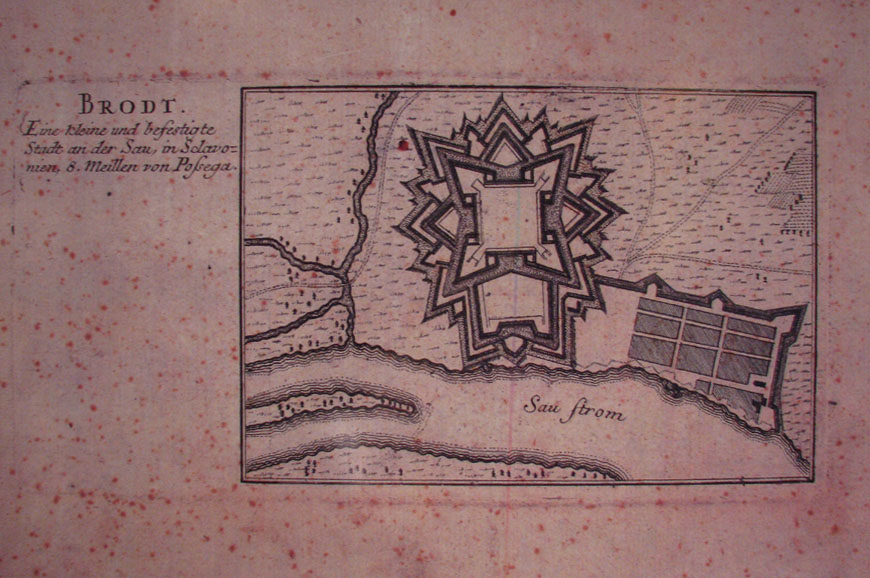
Ground-plan of the Brod fortress, 18th century

The southern part of the Fortress was specially reinforced by the fortification named Hornwerk, because of its horn-like layout (germ. Horn-horn). The principal task of Hornwerk was to obstruct the Turkish crossings over the Sava River by implementation of cannons. However, by the end of the 18th century, within the southern defense zone several constructions were erected, such as the Fortress Commander building which today houses The School of Music Slavonski Brod, Officers' Pavilion, which apart from the officers' apartments and which today houses the City Government Headquarters, the Fortress Chaplain cabin (today a closed cafe bar), the Commander's kitchen, the cart-wright's and stables, while the remaining free areas were used for orchards, gardens and parks.

== The internal part ==
The internal central part of the Fortress is rectangular and consists of four bastions connected by defensive walls. The bastions - pentagonal rammed earth bulwarks brick walled from the outside were organized for the final resistance against the enemies, and were used to monitor the area in front of the Fortress, defend the external walls and the neighboring bastion. Apart from cannon platforms 46 centimetres (18 in) high, up to 4 sentry boxes were placed on each bastion for defense purposes. There are curtain walls - the main walls connecting each two bastions. They were brick-built, with a clay overlayer on the top side for the defense path. In the curtain wall interior there are rooms for accommodation of men and ammunition, as well as the workshops required for the Fortress functioning, with passages across the middle. Nowadays, in the reconstructed forge room in the west curtain wall, visitors of the Fortress can meet the Fortress blacksmith.

== The central part ==
Within the central part there is the Cavalier - a massive brick-walled two-storey building in the form of the horse-shoe. In the Cavalier interior there were up to 108 large rooms of identical dimensions - casemates, used for the army logistic purposes, namely for the accommodation of the soldiers, artillery workshops, cart-wright's, locksmith's, armorer's shop, armory, bakery, storage, hospital, pharmacy.

Today, the renovated part of the southwestern tract of the Cavalier, on the gross area of 1,800 square metres (19,000 sq ft), houses the unique Ružić Gallery with the first permanent exhibition of the Croatian modern art of the second half of the 20th century. More than 400 works of art from the collection of the Croatian sculptor and painter, Branko Ružić, born in Brod (Slavonski Brod, 1919 - Zagreb, 1997), as well as his contemporaries and friends are at display in the Gallery. There is a baroque Fortress church of St. Ann at the center of the Fortress square, protected by two buildings on the south side - the Slavonian barracks, renovated and today housing the classical program high school of Father Marijan Lanosović and the Headquarters barracks. The organized tourist groups, previously announced at the Tourist Board, have the opportunity to attend the "living history" programs at the Fortress square, featuring individuals dressed as hussars of the 12 Slavonian hussar regiment from the second half of the 18th century, as well as the other characters from the Fortress past such as the Fortress Commander and the Fortress clerk, the Fortress guards and craftsmen etc.

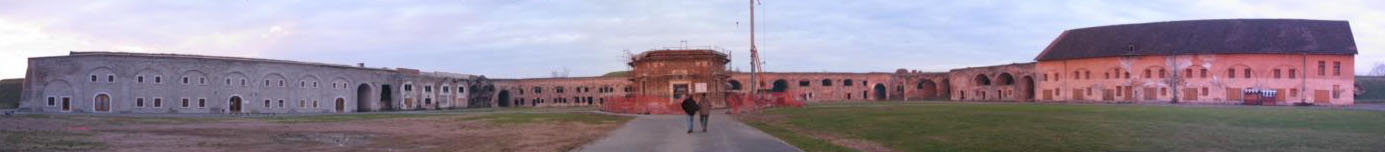
Central part (panoramic)

== The external defence zone ==
The external defense zone consisted of ravelins - triangular bastions protecting the main walls and obstructing the enemy access to the Fortress. All ravelins are constructed of rammed earth and brick walled on the outside, while in the upper part there is an overlayer and parapets. Within the west and east ravelin walls there is a redoubt - the pentagonal fortification used as a provisional powder magazine and as a gunsmith's. Due to the rapid development of the siege techniques, the Brod Fortress lost its defensive task already by the mid 19th century. From that point onwards, Brod on the Sava River started its intensive development, while the old wooden Brod started to disappear. The devastation of the Brod Fortress continues throughout the 20th century. Some objects were destroyed by the army as useless, while the abandoned and unsustainable buildings cave in and dilapidate. In the period from 1945 up until the Croatian War of Independence in the 1990s, the Fortress serves as accommodation for the soldiers of the National Army of Yugoslavia. Today the Fortress of Brod, cultural heritage site and the unique and monumental example of the 18th century Slavonian military fortification architecture, belongs to the city of Slavonski Brod, decidedly initiating its revitalization.
