= Podvinje, Visoko =

Podvinje
- Village
- Location within Bosnia and Herzegovina
- Coordinates: 44.0321618°N 18.1557901°E
- Country: Bosnia and Herzegovina
- Entity: Federation of Bosnia and Herzegovina
- Canton: Zenica-Doboj
- Municipality: Visoko

Area
  - Total: 0.99 sq mi (2.57 km^{2})

Population (2013)
  - Total: 749
  - Density: 755/sq mi (291/km^{2})
- Time zone: UTC+1 (CET)
  - Summer (DST): UTC+2 (CEST)

Podvinje is a village in the municipality of Visoko, Bosnia and Herzegovina.

== Demographics ==
According to the 2013 census, its population was 749.

Ethnicity in 2013
Ethnicity	Number	Percentage
Bosniaks	720	96.1%
Serbs	11	1.5%
Croats	8	1.1%
other/undeclared	10	1.3%
Total	749	100%
