= Petnja =

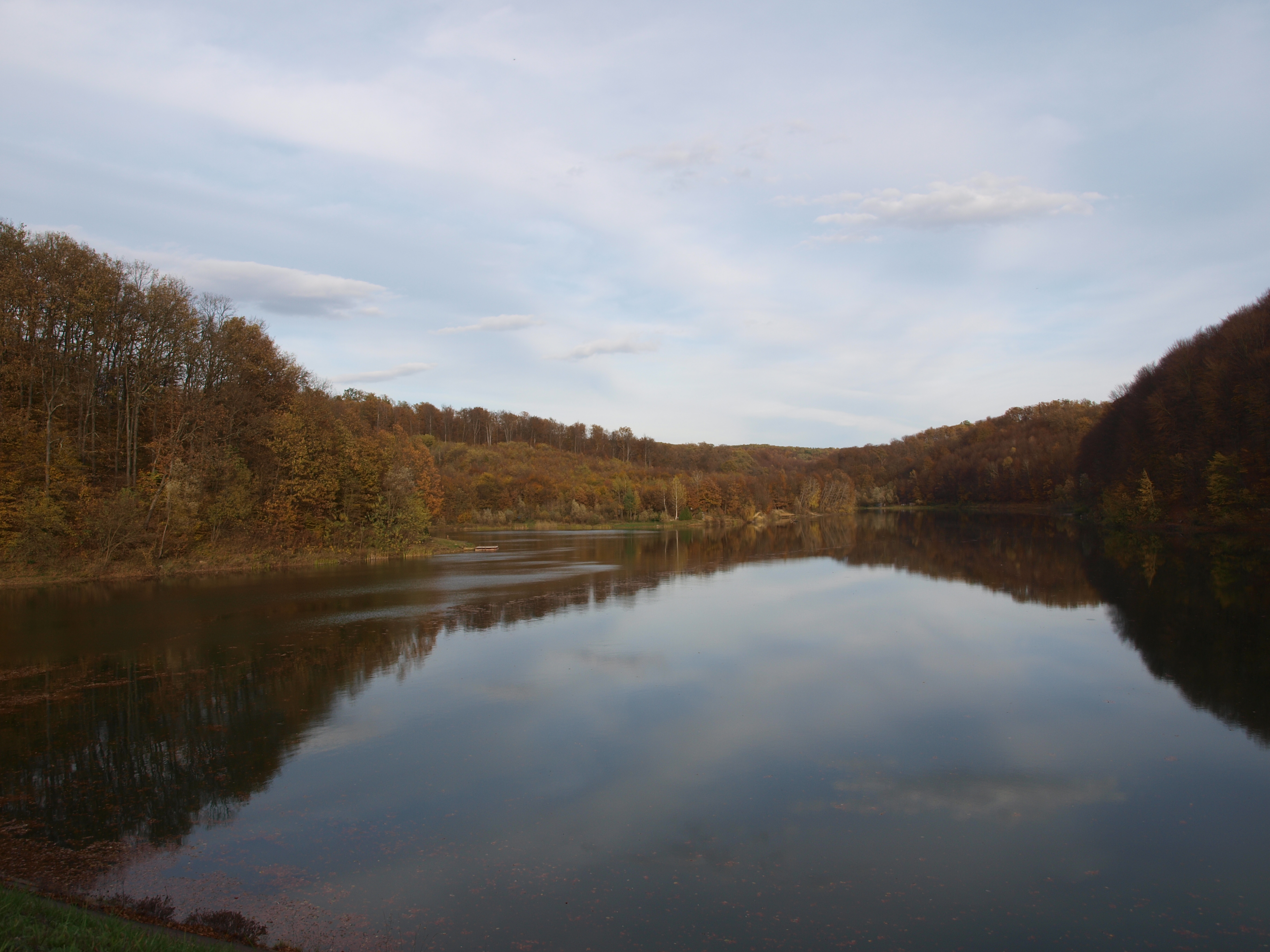
- Petnja in October 2008

- Location within Croatia
- Coordinates: 45°12′14″N 17°57′15″E
- Lake type: reservoir
- Basin countries: Croatia
- Max. length: 1.1 km (0.68 mi)
- Surface area: 0.26 km^{2} (0.10 sq mi)
- Max. depth: 8.25 m (27.1 ft)
- Water volume: 1,500,000 m^{3} (53,000,000 cu ft)
- Surface elevation: 150 m (490 ft)

Petnja Lake is an artificial lake located 3.5 kilometres (2.2 mi) from the municipality of Sibinj (Završje) and 7 kilometres (4.3 mi) north-west of the city of Slavonski Brod, Croatia. It was created by the construction of a water dam in 1968, and through its existence has been excellently integrated into the environment. Today, it is an integral part of the area's ecosystem.

The lake is surrounded by an ancient Slavonian forest and is called "The eye of Dilj". There are also 3 caves in the area and numerous water sources. The water is supplied through fifteen springs, and the main water supply is the Petnja stream.

It is an attraction for many nature lovers and hikers, and a great picnic destination. Being 8m deep and having over 20 different types of fish, it is also a popular destination for fishermen throughout the year.
