= Jovsi =

Coordinates: 45°55′N 15°41′E

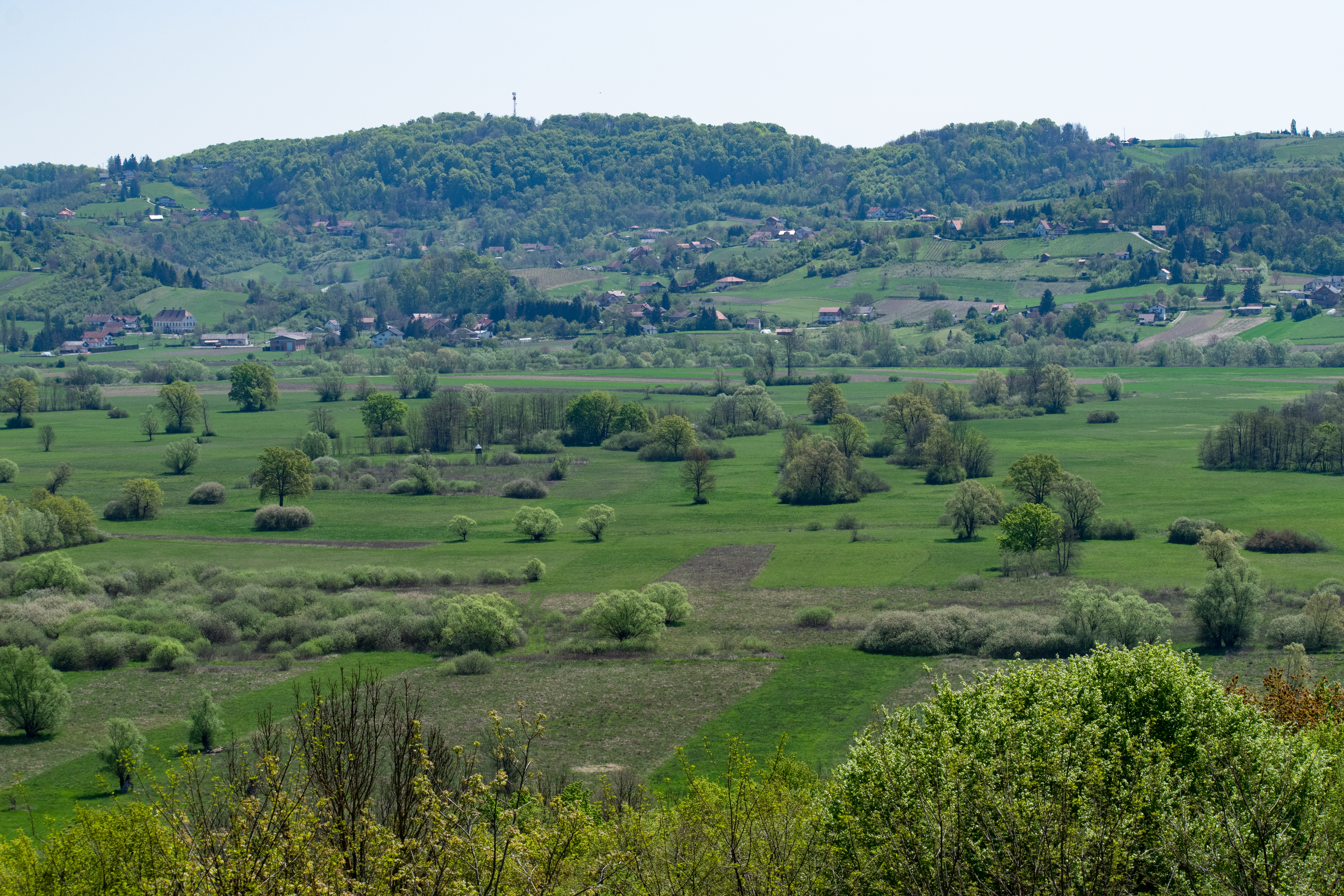
Jovsi

Jovsi is an extensive natural plain divided into wetlands and covering an area of 4.6 square kilometers (1.8 sq mi) in the Municipality of Brežice in Slovenia. It lies west of the lower course of the Sotla River below the Kapele Hills (Slovene: Kapelske gorice). It is bounded by the road from Župelevec to Dobova to the west and the Sotla River to the east.

Theories derive the name Jovsi from Slovene jelša 'alder' (a common wetland tree) or from German Jauchsee 'fetid lake'. Until the Sotla River was regulated, the area was regularly inundated by floodwaters from the river.

Jovsi is a flood-zone wetland of exceptional natural interest, distinguished by its great diversity of flora and fauna. About 80 species of birds nest here, which has provided ornithologists with the opportunity to collect extensive data. Certain important European species are regularly or intermittently found in Jovsi: the white-tailed eagle (Haliaeetus albicilla), European roller (Coracias garrulus), black stork (Ciconia nigra), white stork (Ciconia ciconia), common snipe (Gallinago gallinago), corn crake (Crex crex), and lesser grey shrike (Lanius minor).

Because of its importance for nature conservation, the area is protected as a nature park.
