= Slavonski Brod =

- City
- Grad Slavonski Brod; City of Slavonski Brod
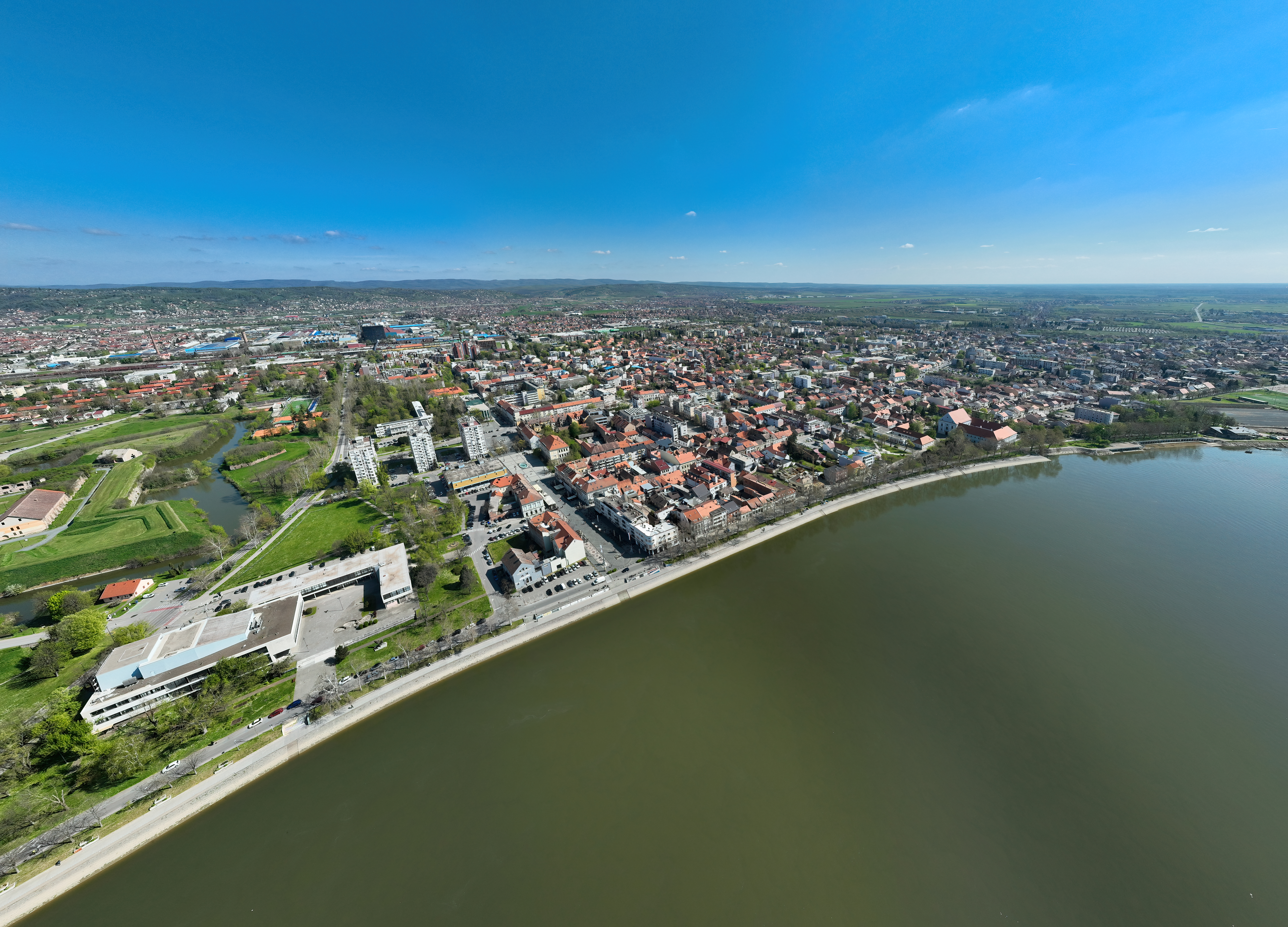
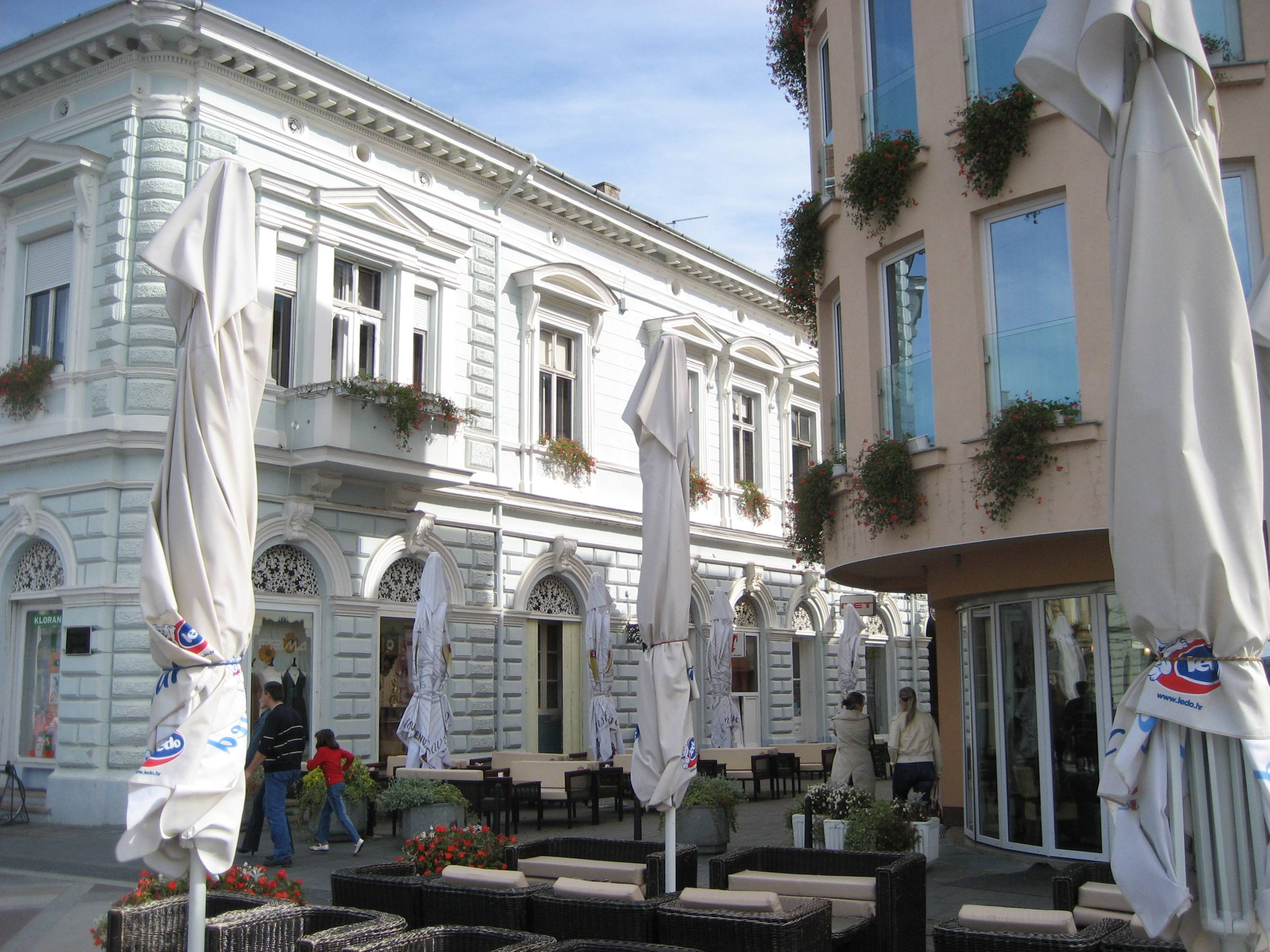
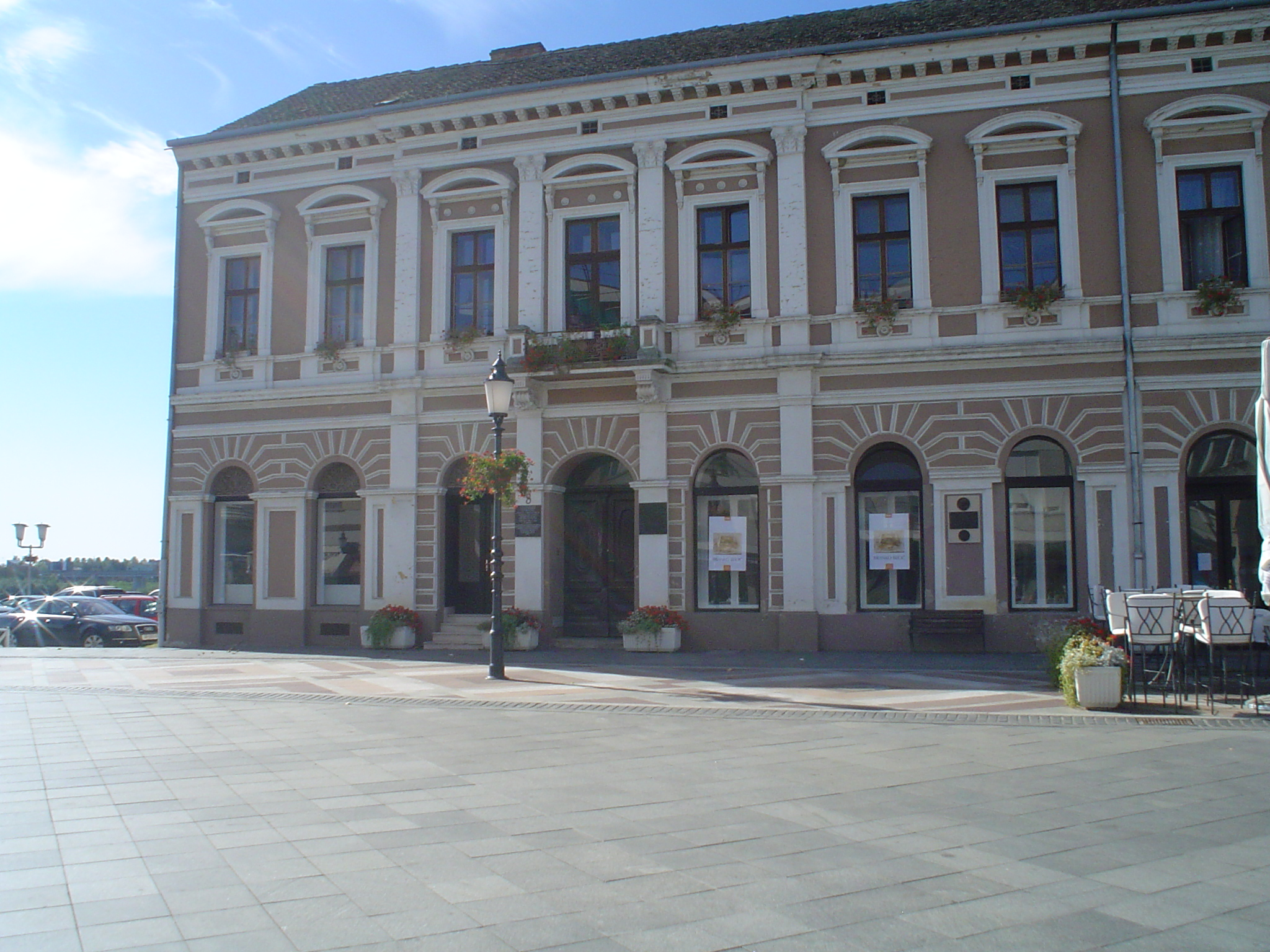
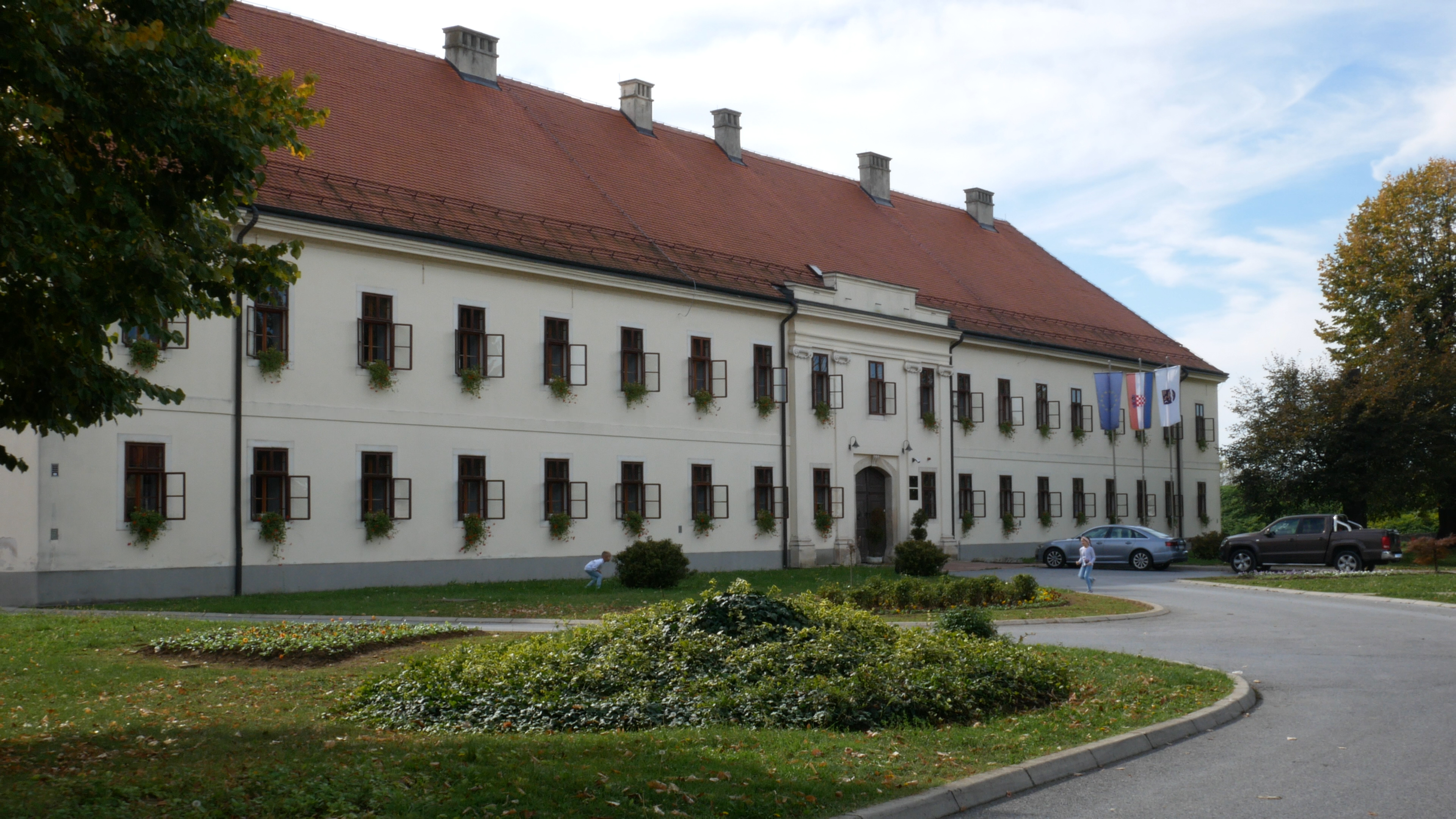
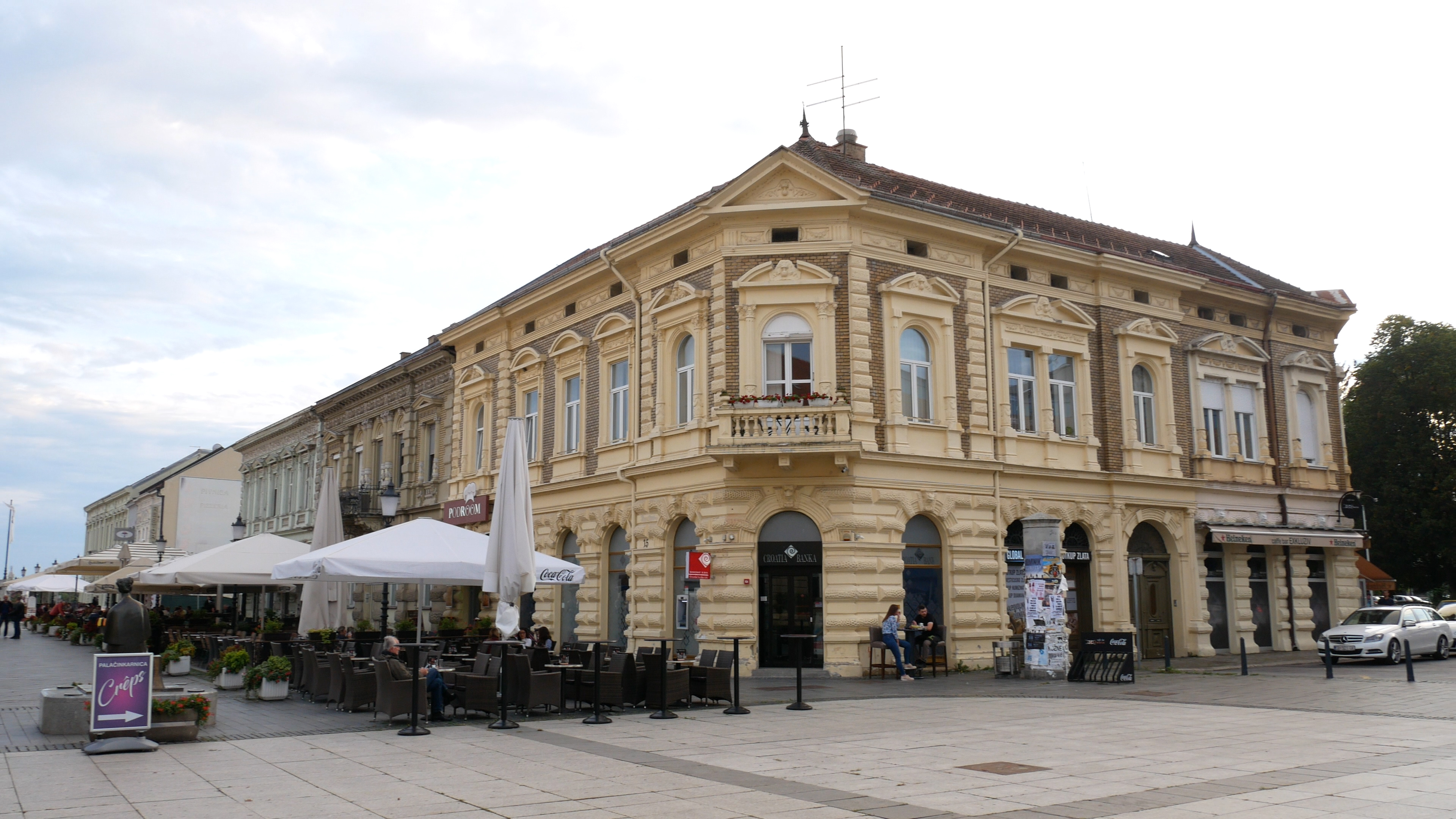
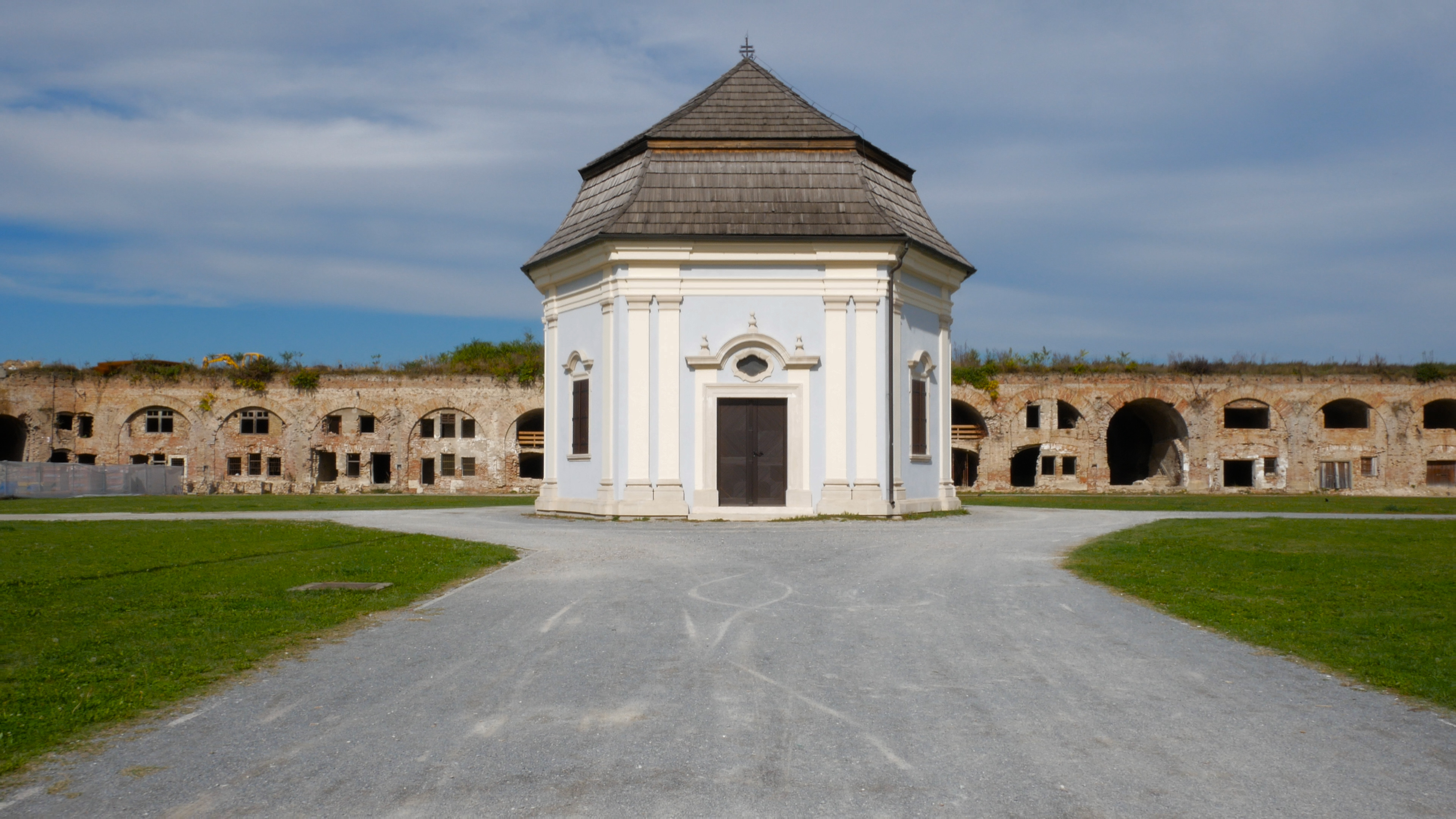
- From Top to bottom: Panoramic view of Slavonski Brod, Korzo city centre, House of Ivana Brlić-Mažuranić, Officers' pavilion, Palaces in the city centre, and Brod Fortress

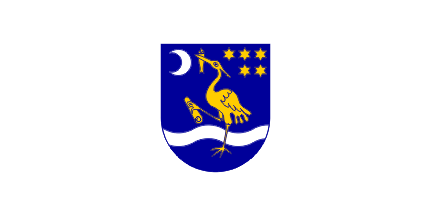
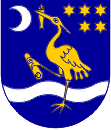
- Flag Coat of arms
- Interactive map of Slavonski Brod
- Location within Croatia
- Coordinates: 45°10′N 18°01′E
- Country: Croatia
- County: Brod-Posavina County

Government
  - Mayor: Mirko Duspara (Ind.)
  - City Council: 25 members: • Ind. Mirko Duspara (10); • HDZ (6); • SDP (5); • HSP AS (3); • HSLS (1)

Area
  - City: 54.1 km^{2} (20.9 sq mi)
  - Urban: 41.7 km^{2} (16.1 sq mi)
- Elevation: 92 m (302 ft)

Population (2021)
  - City: 49,891
  - Density: 922/km^{2} (2,390/sq mi)
  - Urban: 45,005
  - Urban density: 1,080/km^{2} (2,800/sq mi)
- Time zone: UTC+1 (CET)
  - Summer (DST): UTC+2 (CEST)
- Postal code: 35000
- Area code: 035
- License plate: SB
- Website: slavonski-brod.hr

Slavonski Brod (pronounced [slǎʋoːnskiː brôːd], lit. 'Slavonian Brod') is a city in eastern Croatia, near the border with Bosnia and Herzegovina. As one of the principal cities in the historical regions of Slavonia and Posavina, Slavonski Brod is the 7th largest city in the country, with a population of 59,141 as of the 2011 census. It is the centre of Brod-Posavina County and a major river port on the Sava river.

== Names ==
In Croatian, the term brod, derived from Old Slavic brodъ, is an archaic word for 'ford', a shallow section of a river that can be crossed on foot or horseback. The other meaning of brod, having little to do with the city's name, is 'ship', by metathesis derived from the Germanic word board – from the phrase "on board".

Among the names historically in use were Marsonia in the Roman Empire, Brood (in Slawonien) in the German speaking Austrian period, Brod na Savi after 1934.

== Geography ==
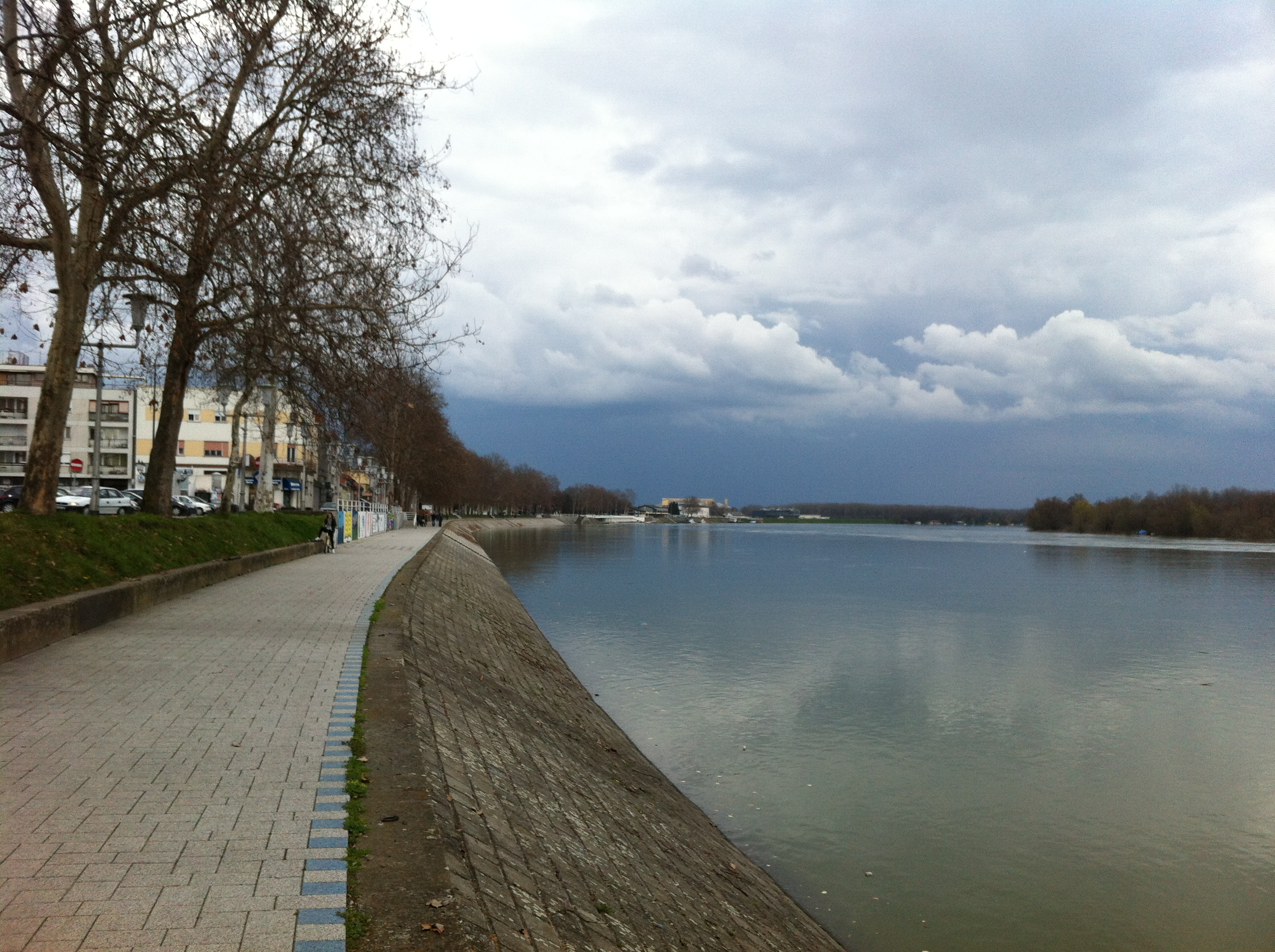
Sava river promenade

The city is located 197 kilometres (122 miles) southeast of Zagreb and at an elevation of 96 metres (315 feet). It developed at the strategically important crossing over the Sava river toward Brod in Bosnia and Herzegovina. The Bosnian city was called Bosanski Brod until 2009.

Slavonski Brod is an important intersection of the Posavina part of the highway and a railway junction, since it is located on the highway linking Zagreb–Lipovac–Belgrade (E70, A3) and the Zagreb–Vinkovci–Belgrade railway. The ship port "Brod" on the Sava river is under construction.

There is also a new modern highway under construction, on the Pan-European Corridor Vc, which will connect Northern Europe and Hungary with Croatia (through the region of Slavonia), and Bosnia and Herzegovina with Croatia (through the coastal region of Dalmatia). The alignment of this highway is approximately at a 19 km (12 mi) distance from the center of the town. With the completion of this route, the area of the town Slavonski Brod will become one of the major highway intersections in this part of Europe connecting directions west–east and north–south.

== Demographics ==
Historical population
Year	Pop.	±%
1857	4,015	—
1869	4,775	+18.9%
1880	5,872	+23.0%
1890	6,940	+18.2%
1900	9,627	+38.7%
1910	13,193	+37.0%
1921	13,729	+4.1%
1931	19,203	+39.9%
1948	20,196	+5.2%
1953	23,116	+14.5%
1961	30,093	+30.2%
1971	40,043	+33.1%
1981	49,153	+22.8%
1991	57,229	+16.4%
2001	64,612	+12.9%
2011	59,141	−8.5%
2021	49,891	−15.6%
Source: Naselja i stanovništvo Republike Hrvatske 1857–2021, DZS

Slavonski Brod is the sixth largest city in Croatia, after Zagreb, Split, Rijeka, Osijek and Zadar.

Brod is the center of a built-up area of more than 110,000 inhabitants including Brod in Bosnia, Sibinj, Bukovlje, Brodski Stupnik, Podcrkavlje, Gornja Vrba and Klakar.

The following settlements comprise the administrative area of Slavonski Brod:

- Brodski Varoš, population 2,035
- Podvinje, population 3,575
- Slavonski Brod, population 53,531
City of Slavonski Brod: Population trends 1857–2021
v

population	4015	4775	5872	6940	9627	13193	13729	19203	20196	23116	30093	40043	49153	57229	64612	59141	49891
	1857	1869	1880	1890	1900	1910	1921	1931	1948	1953	1961	1971	1981	1991	2001	2011	2021

Sources: Croatian Bureau of Statistics publications

== History ==
A favorable geographical location, pleasant continental climate, fertile soil and being in the vicinity of the river Sava have all resulted with the city being inhabited since a prehistoric age.

=== Prehistory ===
The northeastern part of the city, at Galovo, recently revealed a rich deposit of the Starčevo culture, dating in the Early Stone Age. Besides the fact that this is the largest archaeological finding in northern Croatia, it proves that the locality of Brod has been inhabited for at least 8,000 years.

=== Roman period ===
The first historical settlement in Brod dates from Roman times, the settlement being known as Marsonia. It is still disputed whether Marsonia was a postal station, lodging for the night or an actual settlement.

The Peutinger map refers to Marsonia as Marsonie, while the work "Notitia Dignitatum" has Marsonia under the name of "Auxilia Ascaria Tauruno sive Marsonia". The issue of Marsonia becoming a city has been tackled by the publishers of Ptolemy's geography, dating from the 16th century. The first geographer who located the position of Marsonia at the locality of Brod was Abraham Ortelius, who, in his atlas Theatrum orbis terrarum (Antwerp 1590) published a map, the objective of which was to reconstruct and connect the antic names of Panonian and Illyric settlements with the towns of that time. It was he who placed Marsonia at today's location of Brod.

Peutinger's table clearly shows that Marsonia initially existed next to the Sava river, at the place where the Roman road crossed the river. The first Croatian expert, claiming that the Roman MARSVNNIA was located where Brod is now is Matija Petar Katančić, giving this assertion additional support.

=== Modern history ===
The Slavs settled in the area of the city in the 6th century. The name of the town is mentioned for the first time in Bela IV of Hungary's charter, dated 1224. The Vukovac fortress was built in the 15th century, subsequently damaged by the Turks. The Ottoman Empire controlled the settlement from 1536 until 1691, when it was ceded to the Empire of Austria, as confirmed by the Treaty of Karlowitz in 1699. Until 1918, Brod (named Brood before 1850) remained in the Austrian monarchy (Kingdom of Croatia-Slavonia after the compromise of 1867), in the Slavonian Military Frontier, under the administration of the Brooder Grenz-Infanterie-Regiment N°VII until 1881. A huge Vauban type fortress was built east of Vukovac.

Alongside its defence role the city saw steady development of crafts and commerce. The education and culture were strongly dominated by the Franciscans. The 20th century was a period of strong economic growth of the city, with the 1920s being called "the Golden Age of Brod". The city's current name dates from 1934 when it was changed from Brod na Savi.

From 1941 to 1945 the city was part of the Independent State of Croatia. The town was heavily bombed by the Allies in 1944 and 1945. The bombing resulted in damage to 80% of the buildings in Slavonski Brod. The bombing resulted in 897 civilian deaths, 244 military deaths, 208 wounded civilians, and 28 military wounded in Slavonski Brod and Bosanski Brod. Historical Archive of Slavonski Brod was established in the city in 1959.

In 1990 democratic reforms legalised the formation of political parties other than the League of Communists of Croatia. In Slavonski Brod, the first parties formed were the Croatian Democratic Union and the Croatian Democratic Party.

=== During the Croatian War of Independence ===
During the Croatian War of Independence, Slavonski Brod came under heavy bombardment from Bosnian Serb forces, positioned across the border in Bosanska Posavina, between April and October 1992, during Operation Corridor 92. A total of 11,651 artillery shells and fourteen 9K52 Luna-M rockets were fired against the city, and 130 bombs were dropped from the air, resulting in the deaths of 116 civilians, including 27 children.

== Politics ==
=== Minority councils ===
Directly elected minority councils and representatives are tasked by local or regional authorities with advocating for minority rights and interests, integration into public life and participation in the management of local affairs. During the 2023 Croatian national minorities councils and representatives elections, Roma and Serbs of Croatia elected 15 minority members of councils for the City of Slavonski Brod while Bosniaks of Croatia elected individual representative.

== Economy ==
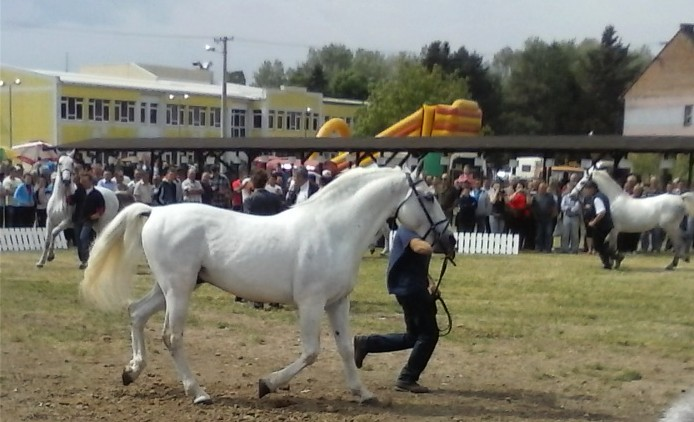
Slavonski Brod agricultural fair

The city's economy is based on farming, viticulture, fruit growing, metal-processing, timber (furniture wood, parquetry), textiles (ready-made), leather, foodstuffs (brewery), building material (lime), and printing industries.

Slavonski Brod is also home to some of the most important metal companies in Southeastern Europe, the Djuro Djakovic consortium, consisting of a number of factories producing very diverse products, mainly for export. The consortium is capable of producing: locomotives, tramways, wagons, bridges, industrial plants, nuclear reactors, car parts, heavily armed vehicles, armoured fighting vehicles, including main battle tanks and mine warfare vehicles, agricultural machinery, etc.

Service industries are becoming rapidly important, especially tourism. The city has an important cultural heritage, including a fortress and a Franciscan monastery with a rich library.

== Cultural heritage ==
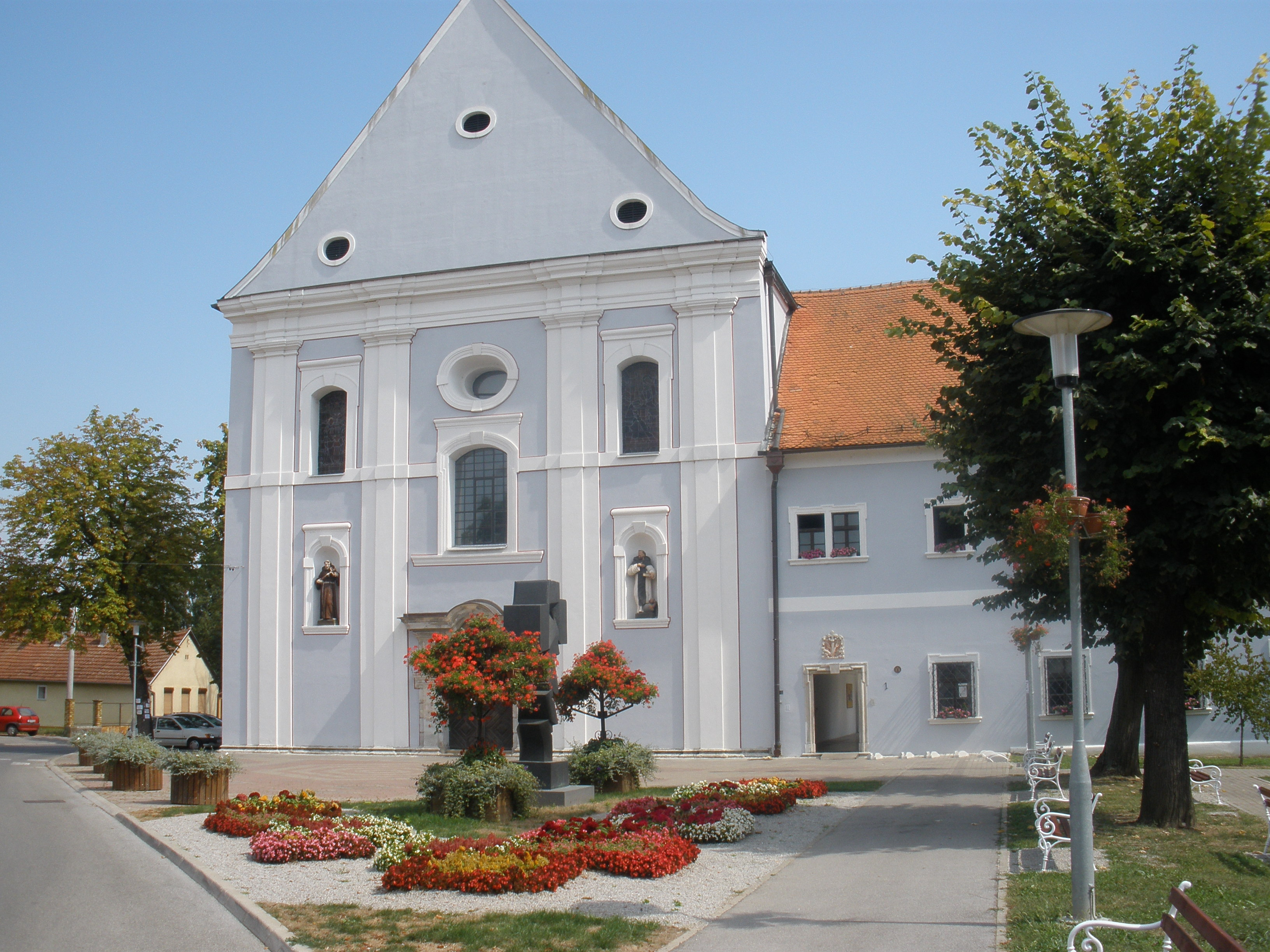
Franciscan monastery

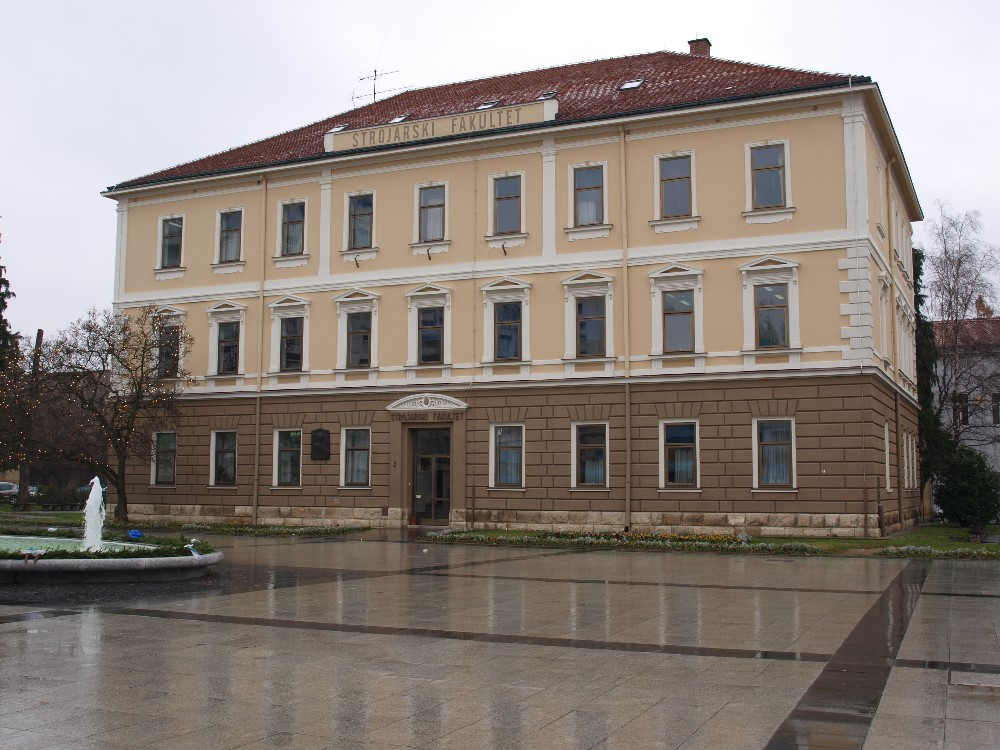
Faculty of Engineering

The Brod Fortress from the Baroque period, was constructed during the Austro-Hungarian Empire to serve as a stronghold against the Ottoman Empire, which was situated on the other bank of the Sava river. It is built in the Vauban style, named after the 17th-century French military engineer. It is one of Europe's best preserved fortresses, and also one of the biggest on the former Austro-Hungarian Military Frontier.

The city's Franciscan monastery dates from the 18th century, and is also Baroque in style. Its main features are the courtyard and the interior of the monastery church, with its altar and paintings. In 1720, a faculty of philosophy was opened here.

The most important annual cultural event in the town is the children's festival 'In the World of the Fairy Tales of Writer Ivana Brlić-Mažuranić', in April and May. The Brodsko kolo, an annual show of original folklore, is held in mid-June, while the Festival of Patriotic Folk Songs takes place in May. The artistic 'Sava' colony cherishes the tradition of watercolour painting.

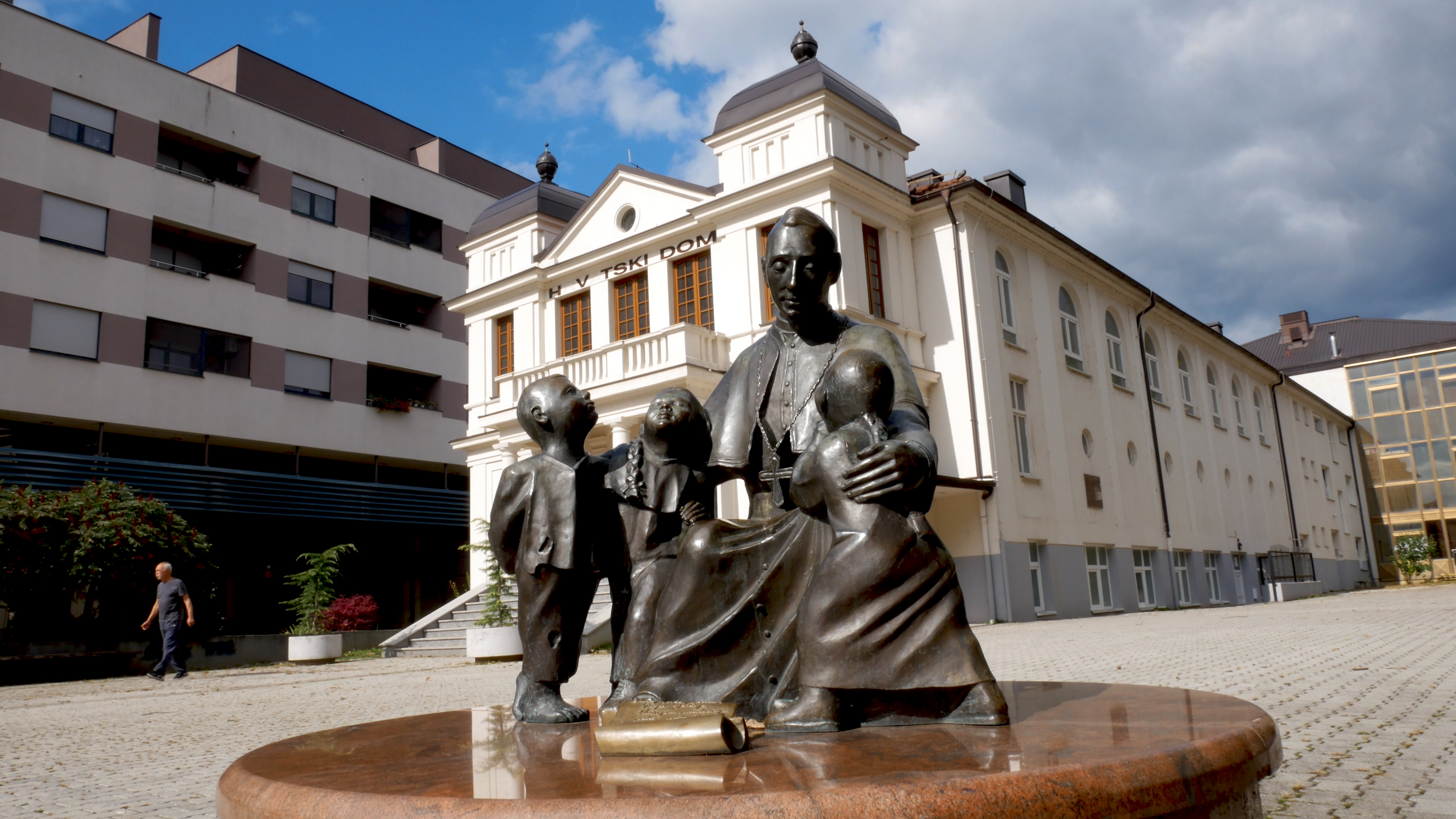
Croatian Home in Slavonski Brod

One of the attractions of Slavonski Brod is a central town square, one of the two or three biggest in all of Croatia, Ivana Brlić-Mažuranić square, named after a popular children's writer, whose house is on the square. This square is also a home to numerous cultural events and has a perfect view of the beautiful Sava river. The square is also dotted with galleries, book stores, cafes, night clubs, and shops, making it a center for entertainment. Close to the square, another attraction is the romantic promenade next to the Sava river - 'Kej' as it is called by citizens of town.

Slavonski Brod Synagogue, destroyed during World War II, was among the largest and most prestigious synagogues in Croatia. Local Serbian Orthodox Church built in 1793 was also destroyed by Ustaše regime during the war. A new church, constructed at a different location and completed in 1990, was again destroyed in 1991. Reconstruction of that second church began in 2016.

Slavonski Brod is home to monuments to bishop Josip Stadler and Croatia's first president Franjo Tuđman. Slavonski Brod and its rail station are featured in Agatha Christie's Murder on the Orient Express as the place near which the Orient Express train breaks down.

== Sports ==
The local chapter of the HPS is HPD "Diljgora", which had 125 members in 1936 under the Eugen Šrepel presidency. At the time, it had a ski section. Membership fell to 105 in 1937. Membership rose to 119 in 1938.

== Education ==
Slavonski Brod has educational institutions for pre-school, primary, secondary and higher education.

The city also hosts the University of Slavonski Brod, and the Primary School Teacher Training College. Some other faculties are expected to be opened soon. In October 2006. an associate-degree college has been founded with several other faculties.

== Transportation ==
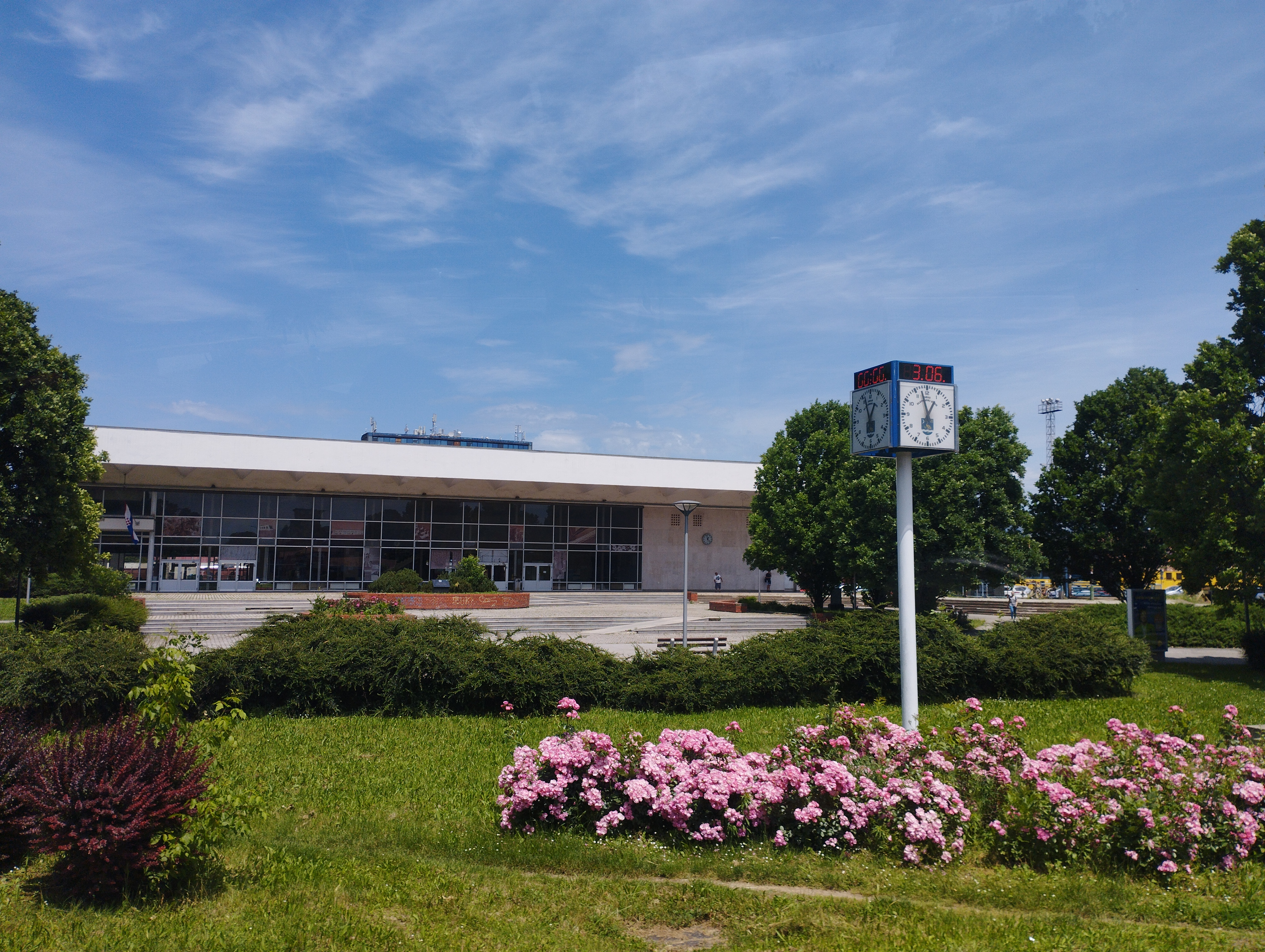
Slavonski Brod Train Station

Slavonski Brod has a train station on M104 railway corridor - it serves as a stop for all trains on international routes which passes through the town (such as Vinkovci - Villach or Zagreb - Belgrade), also being directly connected by a large number of domestic local and limited-stop services running between the capital city of Zagreb and Vinkovci/(Tovarnik, state border with Serbia).

By regular bus lines from various companies, Slavonski Brod bus station is well connected with the surrounding villages, municipalities and cities in Slavonia, such as: Đakovo, Požega and Nova Gradiška, as well as with all major cities throughout Croatia: Pula, Rijeka, Umag, Poreč, Rovinj, Osijek, Zagreb, Karlovac, Zadar, Split, Šibenik, etc. From the international lines there are regular departures in the direction of Germany and Switzerland.

== Surroundings ==
In the immediate surroundings of the town there are hunting grounds (Migalovci), fishponds (Jelas Polje), and a lake (Petnja). There are orchards and vineyards, Dilj mountain (or 'Dilj Gora'), and swimming opportunities.

== Climate ==
Slavonski Brod has a warm-summer humid continental climate (Köppen climate classification Dfb).

Since records began in 1963, the highest temperature recorded at the local weather station at an elevation of 88 metres (289 ft) was 40.5 °C (104.9 °F), on 6 August 2012. The coldest temperature was −27.8 °C (−18.0 °F), on 24 January 1963.

Climate data for Slavonski Brod (1971–2000, extremes 1963–2014)
Month	Jan	Feb	Mar	Apr	May	Jun	Jul	Aug	Sep	Oct	Nov	Dec	Year
Record high °C (°F)	19.4 (66.9)	24.1 (75.4)	27.4 (81.3)	31.4 (88.5)	35.2 (95.4)	37.0 (98.6)	39.5 (103.1)	40.5 (104.9)	36.5 (97.7)	30.2 (86.4)	26.4 (79.5)	23.0 (73.4)	40.5 (104.9)
Mean daily maximum °C (°F)	3.5 (38.3)	6.9 (44.4)	12.5 (54.5)	17.1 (62.8)	22.2 (72.0)	25.2 (77.4)	27.4 (81.3)	27.2 (81.0)	23.1 (73.6)	17.0 (62.6)	9.5 (49.1)	4.8 (40.6)	16.4 (61.5)
Daily mean °C (°F)	−0.2 (31.6)	1.9 (35.4)	6.5 (43.7)	11.0 (51.8)	16.1 (61.0)	19.3 (66.7)	21.0 (69.8)	20.4 (68.7)	16.1 (61.0)	10.6 (51.1)	5.0 (41.0)	1.1 (34.0)	10.7 (51.3)
Mean daily minimum °C (°F)	−3.8 (25.2)	−2.6 (27.3)	0.9 (33.6)	4.9 (40.8)	9.4 (48.9)	12.7 (54.9)	14.0 (57.2)	13.7 (56.7)	9.9 (49.8)	5.4 (41.7)	1.0 (33.8)	−2.4 (27.7)	5.2 (41.4)
Record low °C (°F)	−27.8 (−18.0)	−25.5 (−13.9)	−14.6 (5.7)	−8.4 (16.9)	−1.7 (28.9)	1.7 (35.1)	6.0 (42.8)	4.7 (40.5)	−3.1 (26.4)	−7.4 (18.7)	−13.7 (7.3)	−22 (−8)	−27.8 (−18.0)
Average precipitation mm (inches)	47.3 (1.86)	38.5 (1.52)	45.8 (1.80)	55.9 (2.20)	69.4 (2.73)	82.4 (3.24)	87.8 (3.46)	67.9 (2.67)	62.9 (2.48)	68.3 (2.69)	68.4 (2.69)	53.4 (2.10)	748.1 (29.45)
Average precipitation days (≥ 0.1 mm)	12.0	11.1	12.1	13.4	12.5	13.8	10.4	10.1	9.7	11.0	12.4	13.7	142.2
Average snowy days (≥ 1.0 cm)	11.2	7.3	1.8	0.2	0.0	0.0	0.0	0.0	0.0	0.0	2.7	7.4	30.6
Average relative humidity (%)	87.1	80.9	73.1	72.0	73.6	74.7	73.7	75.6	79.6	82.4	86.3	88.6	79.0
Mean monthly sunshine hours	55.8	90.4	142.6	174.0	223.2	237.0	269.7	254.2	189.0	130.2	66.0	49.6	1,881.7
Source: Croatian Meteorological and Hydrological Service

== Environment ==
The European Environment Agency reported in 2023 that Slavonski Brod has the poorest outdoor air quality of 372 European cities, based on average concentration levels of fine particulate matter, (or PM2.5) over the past two calendar years. The two-year average concentration of PM2.5 was reported to be 26.5μg/m^{3}, which is considered as "very poor" in the categories laid out in Directive 2008/50/EC.

== International relations ==
=== Twin towns — Sister cities ===
Slavonski Brod is twinned with:

- Celje, Slovenia

== Honorary citizens ==
- Josip Stadler (2023)

== See also ==
- Petnja
