= Podvinje, Croatia =

Podvinje
- Village
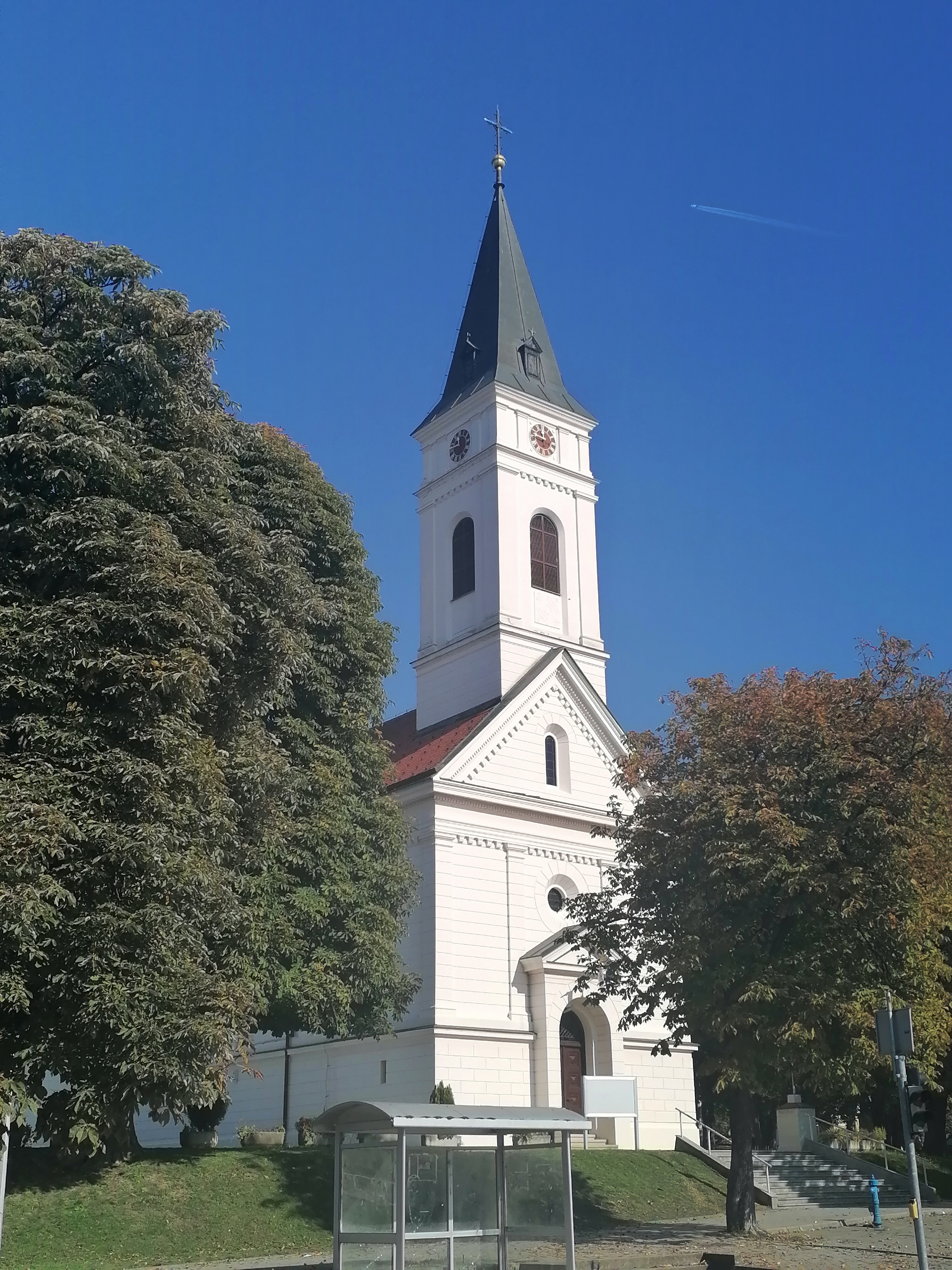
- Interactive map of Podvinje
- Location within Croatia
- Coordinates: 45°11′24″N 18°1′37″E
- Country: Croatia
- County: Brod-Posavina County
- Municipality: Slavonski Brod

Area
  - Total: 4.7 km^{2} (1.8 sq mi)

Population (2021)
  - Total: 3,057
  - Density: 650/km^{2} (1,700/sq mi)
- Time zone: UTC+1 (CET)
  - Summer (DST): UTC+2 (CEST)

Podvinje is a village in municipality of Slavonski Brod in Brod-Posavina County, Croatia.
