= Partisan Memorial Cemetery on Krušik =

- Партизанско спомен-гробље на Крушику (Serbian)
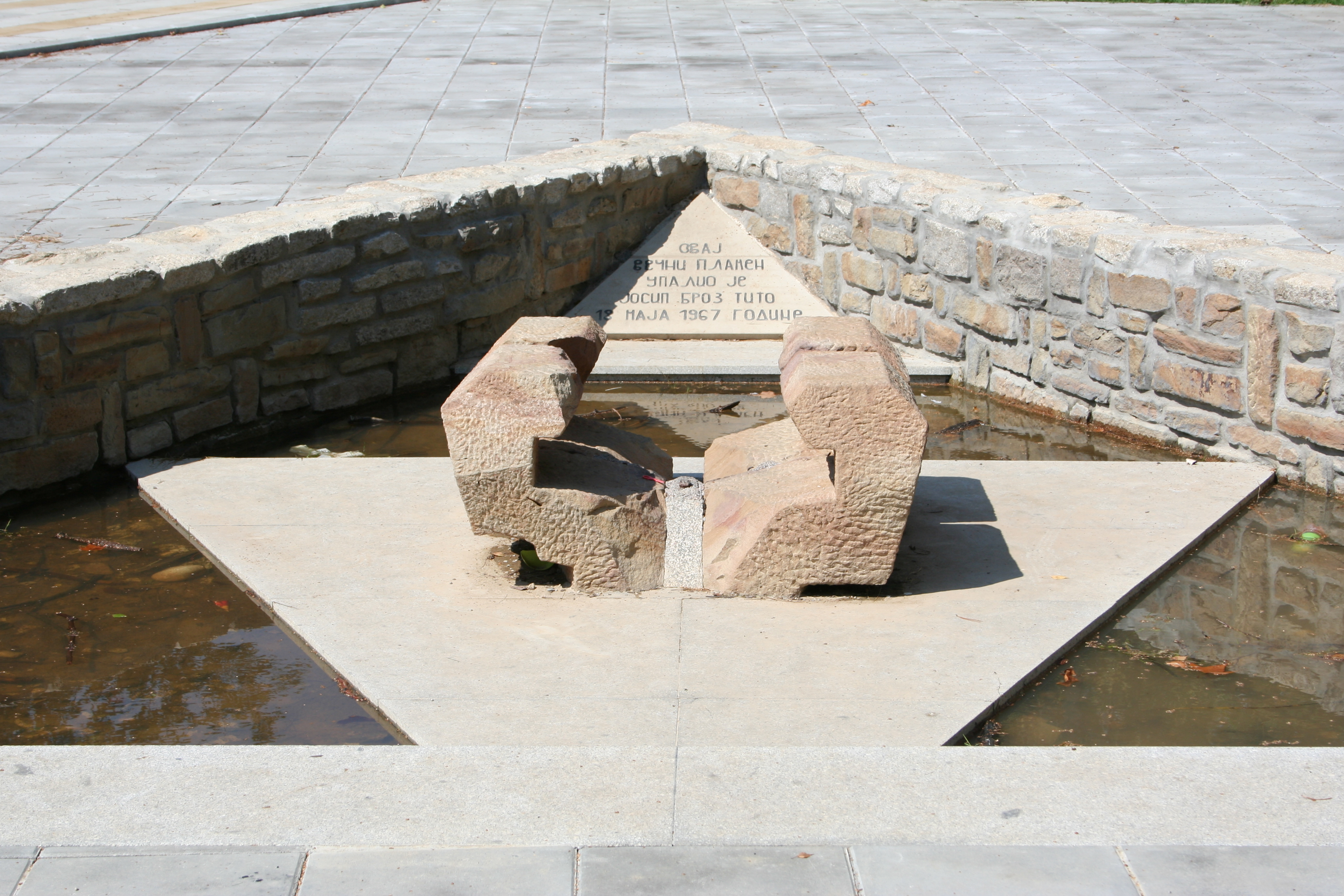
- The central memorial with eternal flame
- Interactive map of Partisan Memorial Cemetery on Krušik
- 44.282248°N 19.890223°E
- Type: Memorial cemetery
- Location: Valjevo, Serbia

History
- Built: 1941–1956

Site notes
- Architect: Božidar Krković (1964 reconstruction)
- Sculptor: Milica Bogunović (eternal flame)
- Governing body: Institute for the Protection of Cultural Monuments Valjevo

Cultural Heritage of Serbia
- Official name: Partisan Memorial Cemetery on Krušik
- Type: Cultural Monument of Great Importance

The Partisan Memorial Cemetery on Krušik in Valjevo, Serbia, is a memorial cemetery in the northwestern part of the city, on Krušik Hill, where 313 fighters and participants of the Partisan National Liberation Movement who were born, fought, or fell in the Valjevo area during World War II in Yugoslavia are buried.

Most of those interred, 261 of them, were participants in the Partisan resistance (the National Liberation War) who were shot by the Germans on 27 November 1941 after being captured and handed over by Ravna Gora Chetniks. They were later joined by others who fell in the Valjevo municipality during the war until the city's liberation in 1944.

Although the large execution site began to be transformed into an organized cemetery during and immediately after the war, the first planned conversion into a memorial park was carried out on the fifteenth anniversary of the shooting in 1956. The cemetery received its present form through a major reconstruction in 1964. Prior to the visit of President Josip Broz Tito to Valjevo in 1967, a central area with an eternal flame was built, which Tito solemnly lit during his visit to the cemetery.

During socialist Yugoslavia, this cemetery held a very important symbolic place on the political map of the city. Political functionaries gathered here for all major state and local holidays to give speeches, pioneers took oaths, and members of the Yugoslav People's Army swore their oaths of allegiance.

Every 27 November, a solemn commemoration for the executed patriots is held at the cemetery on Krušik. The Partisan Memorial Cemetery on Krušik is a cultural monument of great importance.

== History ==
=== Execution of Partisans on Krušik and origins of the cemetery ===
The memorial cemetery is located in the northwestern part of Valjevo, on Krušik Hill. It was at this very spot that the Germans shot 261 captured members and supporters of the Partisan resistance movement on 27 November 1941.

The executed were originally captured by Ravna Gora Chetniks during the Partisan–Chetnik conflict that was flaring up in western Serbia. The handover of the captured Partisans to the Germans was carried out by Jovan Škavo, who was already under the command of Vojvoda Kosta Pećanac, without the knowledge of Colonel Draža Mihailović. After the handover, the prisoners were transferred to Valjevo, where they were beaten, mistreated, and sent to forced labor building a German airfield just outside the city. From this group of prisoners, on the aforementioned 27 November, the Germans shot 261 fighters on Krušik Hill, inside the barracks of the 5th Infantry Regiment "King Milan" that existed there at the time. (Note: This is also why this entire part of Valjevo is colloquially called "Peti puk" ("Fifth Regiment"), and this cemetery is called "Cemetery at Peti puk".)

During the occupation, relatives and friends marked the site of death in the simplest ways. After the liberation of the country, individuals began to place gravestones, wooden pyramids, and other markers. A year later, the entire area was fenced, and brass plates on wooden bases were placed over the graves, inscribed with the names of the executed according to German lists that had been found in the meantime. (Note: Later, these memorial plaques were removed and stored in the depot of the National Museum of Valjevo.) In an effort to more permanently mark the execution site, preserve the memory of the crime, and also to emphasize the political function of monuments in post-war society—as "sources of the revolution"—the space was transformed through memorial-park design and landscaping.

The general social situation and the political climate in which Yugoslavia found itself decisively influenced the decision to build an ossuary. Specifically, following the 1948 Cominform Resolution—which triggered the Tito–Stalin split between Yugoslavia and the Soviet bloc—the Soviet side launched a propaganda campaign attempting to discredit the new Yugoslav leadership, among other things by downplaying the contribution of the Partisan forces in the fight against fascism. As art historian Violeta Obrenović points out, it was probably this rift with Moscow that influenced the decision of the Government of the People's Republic of Serbia to initiate the construction of a series of monuments dedicated to the National Liberation War throughout Serbia (Kragujevac, Čačak, Bela Crkva, Jajinci, etc.), including the one in Valjevo.

=== Construction ===
The memorial park was opened on the fifteenth anniversary of the mass execution of patriots, in the presence of a large number of working people, citizens, relatives of the executed, and representatives of workers' and socio-political organizations. The complex consisted only of an ossuary and newly installed memorial plaques with the names of the fallen in an altered form, since, after subsequent verification, the names of persons who were found not to have been shot at this location were omitted. The project was made in the studio of the Belgrade "General Plan" by architect Vera Đurić.

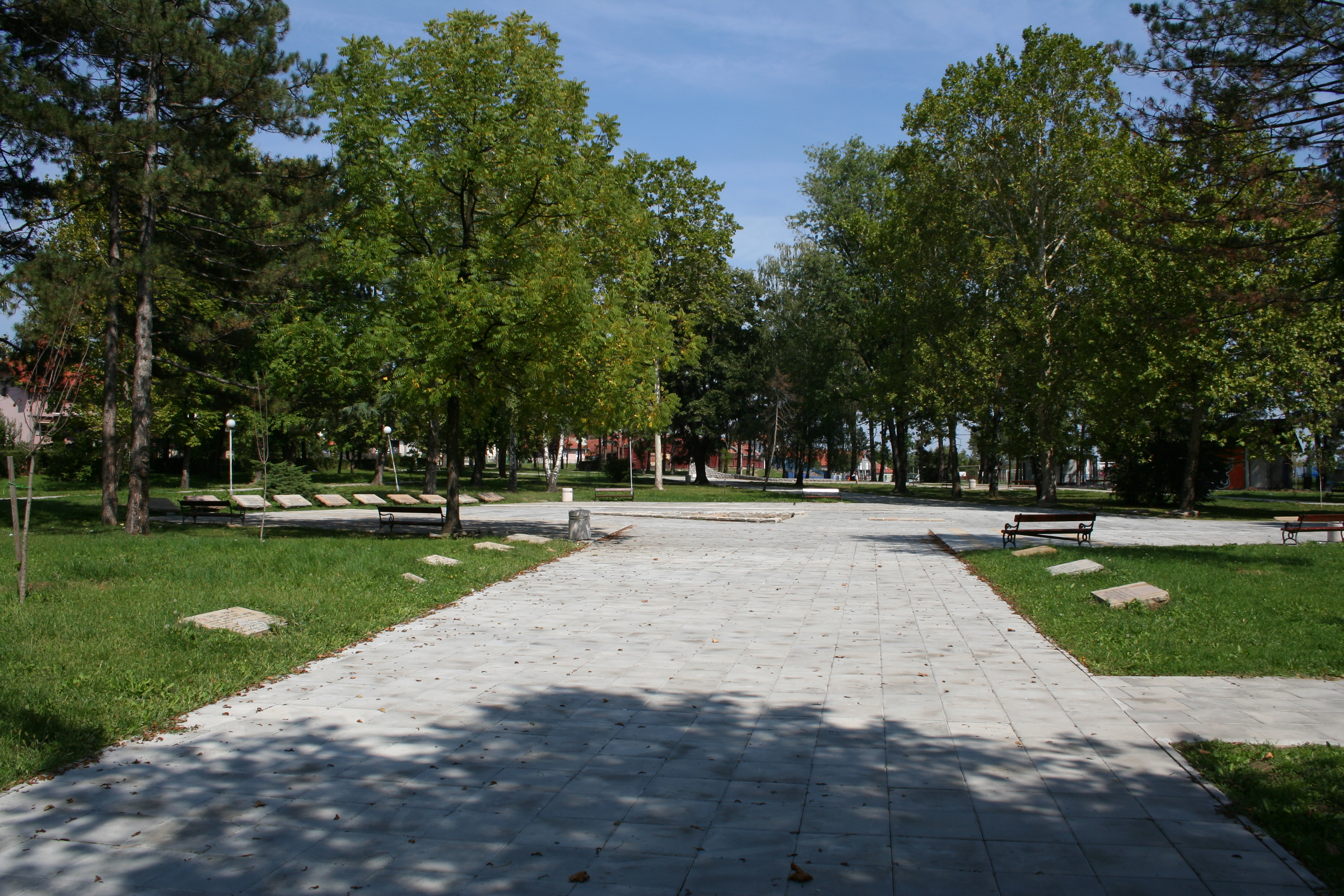
1. Panoramic view of the memorial cemetery

Similar to most ossuaries in Serbia from the Second World War period, this one in Valjevo was modestly arranged and equipped. As it increasingly became an important symbolic place in the political space of Valjevo of that time and a gathering place for organizations associated with the official Partisan resistance narrative, the need for reconstruction and expansion soon arose. The architect of the new project for the memorial cemetery was Božidar Krković, an architectural engineer from Valjevo, who was also entrusted with all works related to the execution of construction and other works. The construction work was otherwise carried out free of charge by workers from Valjevo construction and utility companies, with costs consisting only of purchased building material.

Through this reconstruction and expansion, which took place only in 1964, the memorial cemetery obtained its appearance that has essentially not changed to this day. It was shaped as an irregular triangle covering an area of 2.5 hectares. It is enclosed by a hedge, and at the entrance a place for laying wreaths, flagpoles, and a plaque reading: "To the fighters of the revolution fallen on the soil of this region 1941–1944... Only the horizons of future days will be able to measure the meaning of their death... 7 July 1964." The interior consists of a grassy area intersected by paved pedestrian paths and numerous memorial plaques, with ornamental plants.

As part of the reconstruction and expansion, in addition to the existing memorial ossuaries, the remains of Partisan fighters and anti-fascist resistance supporters who fell during the war in the territory of the municipality of Valjevo were transferred and buried at the cemetery. Thus the number of mounds after the expansion totaled 64, in which 313 fighters of the National Liberation War were buried and recorded on plaques, including prominent fighters and national heroes from the Valjevo area who were killed elsewhere outside Valjevo and its surroundings.

The newly arranged and expanded memorial cemetery on Krušik was solemnly opened on Uprising Day of the People of Serbia – 7 July 1964. The opening ceremony was attended by about 15,000 citizens of Valjevo, surviving fighters of the National Liberation War from the area, and their relatives. The ceremonial speech was delivered by Vojin Lukić, then federal secretary for internal affairs.

==== Eternal flame ====
The definitive appearance of the memorial cemetery was achieved on 18 May 1967, the day of the visit of President of the Republic Josip Broz Tito to Valjevo, including the cemetery on Krušik. The changes consisted of rearranging and expanding the central area of the cemetery, transferring the remains of some additional fighters, and arranging several new mounds. Above each mound, memorial plaques with basic biographical data of the buried fighters were placed, although a considerable number of "unknown fighters" still remained. In the central part of the cemetery, for this occasion, a section with a torch and an eternal flame was added. The torch was made of metal, and the space around it was walled in the shape of a triangle, in the upper corner of which a sandstone block was placed with the following text cast in metal letters:

THIS

ETERNAL FLAME
WAS LIT BY
JOSIP BROZ TITO

ON 18 MAY 1967.

The author of the entire design was academic sculptor Milica Bogunović from Belgrade.

On 18 May, after visiting the "Krušik" factory, the largest factory in Valjevo, where he gave a speech and talked with workers, Tito drove to the Partisan cemetery, where he was met and greeted at the entrance by the president of the Valjevo municipal committee of the Federation of Veterans' Associations of the National Liberation War of Yugoslavia (SUBNOR), Borivoje Jevtić, accompanied by Ilija Šolaja and Maksim Kovačević. The President then laid a wreath before the eternal flame in the central part of the cemetery, and after the Yugoslav national anthem was sung, he approached with a lit torch and lit the eternal fire. The choir of students from the Valjevo Gymnasium then sang the ceremonial song "Jugoslavijo" by Nikola Hercigonja. (figs. 2, 3 and 4)

After that, Tito walked through the memorial complex and greeted members of the families of fallen fighters. This concluded Tito's visit to the cemetery. On departure, the choir sent him off with the song "Druže Tito mi ti se kunemo", and he, through an unbroken line of citizens of Valjevo, headed to the Monument to the Fighters of the Revolution on Vidrak Hill, where he was greeted by National Hero Milosav Milosavljević and first fighters Živorad Žika Gajić and Radomir Raka Vićentijević, laid flowers before the monument, and spoke praisefully about it.

=== Later decades and present day ===
In memory of the executed Partisans and resistance supporters, every 27 November, the day of their execution in 1941, commemorative ceremonies are held at the memorial cemetery. The first such ceremony took place on 27 November 1946, and according to the local newspaper "Napred", about 8,000 people participated (by comparison, Valjevo then had about 10,000 inhabitants) – all schools, citizens, children, etc.

The memorial cemetery on Krušik, like other ossuaries throughout socialist Yugoslavia, was originally a materialized testimony to the horrors of the war tragedy: a place for expressing sorrow over tragically lost lives and for cathartic encounters of survivors. However, over time, as historian Olga Manojlović Pintar points out, the practice of commemoration began to change. The fallen in the war, through numerous symbols and rituals, from subjects to whom ceremonies were dedicated, became objects on which ideological and political concepts were based—being instrumentalized as a central symbol of state unity and legitimation of the political order.

The commemorative ceremony at the memorial cemetery on Krušik was organized every year during socialist Yugoslavia by the Municipal Committee of SUBNOR, while its immediate executors and hosts were the Local Community "Krušik" on whose territory the memorial cemetery is located, and the elementary school "Andra Savčić" from Valjevo. The program for years usually consisted of laying wreaths and flowers, speeches by prominent participants of the National Liberation War or politicians from Valjevo, and a cultural-artistic program in which members of amateur cultural associations from the city, members of the Yugoslav People's Army, and students of Valjevo schools participated. The speeches in content usually consisted of evoking memories of the war period and the tragic event of the shooting, then referring to the post-war period, the socialist revolution, and the building of the country, and finally commenting on the current political and economic situation in the country.

In an effort to avoid a certain stereotypy and monotony, and to attract a larger number of youth and citizens to the 27 November ceremonies, officials of local branches of SUBNOR from Titovo Užice, Gornji Milanovac, Čačak, Ljig, Mionica, and Valjevo, as well as representatives of municipal conferences of the Socialist Alliance of Working People of Yugoslavia (SSRN), at a joint meeting on 27 November 1982 decided to change the commemoration program. This was done so that each following year the program was prepared by an organization from a different one of the mentioned municipalities, usually a municipality from whose territory a larger number of fighters were shot at Krušik. Thus in 1983 Čačak had the honor of preparing and organizing the ceremony, in 1984 Titovo Užice, in 1985 Gornji Milanovac, and the next year, on the forty-fifth anniversary, Valjevo.

Apart from commemorating the shooting on 27 November, the Partisan Memorial Cemetery on Krušik was used during the SFRY for numerous other events of similar political purpose—nurturing and strengthening combat and revolutionary traditions. Commemorative ceremonies were held here related to 4 May—the day of death of lifelong President of the SFRY Josip Broz Tito; occasionally members of the JNA took solemn oaths at the cemetery; the Pioneer oath was also organized here, as well as the initiation of pioneers into the League of Socialist Youth of Yugoslavia and the mass admission of youth into the League of Communists of Yugoslavia. Winners of various competitions were often solemnly proclaimed here, and the cemetery was an obligatory part of visits of all major tourist groups to Valjevo. In July 1961, a documentary film titled "Events from Our Region" dedicated to the tragic event of 27 November 1941 was also shot here.

The surroundings of the memorial cemetery also changed over time. While before, during, and immediately after the war, the barracks of the 5th Infantry Regiment "King Milan" stood here, residential buildings were built in their place during socialist Yugoslavia, forming a neighborhood that was named "Peti puk" ("Fifth Regiment"). Near the cemetery, in 1979, another residential neighborhood named "27. novembar" was built. Generally speaking, unlike before the war, after the war the entire area of Krušik Hill was urbanized. In memory of the tragic events on Krušik Hill, the large Valjevo defense industry factory also took the name of this hill after the war.

With the democratic changes and the breakup of Yugoslavia in the 1990s, the memorial cemetery ceased to occupy the symbolic place it once had in the political space of Valjevo. The commemorations on 27 November, as well as Victory Day over Fascism and the day of liberation of Valjevo in World War II, continue regularly every year, but with significantly fewer participants.

Since its creation, the memorial cemetery has been renovated and conserved several times. Publicist Milorad Radojčić in his work on the cemetery from 1987 states that at that time the memorial cemetery was in fairly good condition, with sporadic damage to asphalt paths and especially old memorial plaques, which were quickly repaired.

In 2003, the memorial cemetery underwent comprehensive renovation. The works, according to the project of the Institute for the Protection of Cultural Monuments Valjevo, were financed by the then Ministry of Labor and Social Policy.

The memorial cemetery was again comprehensively reconstructed in April 2016. The reconstruction consisted of replacing time-worn concrete paths and asphalt with concrete pavers, restoring stone and marble plaques with the names of shot Partisans, installing new lighting, benches, decorative planters, and restoring grassy areas and trees.

Today, the Krušik Memorial Cemetery is a cultivated memorial park that is regularly maintained and intensively used for rest and recreation by citizens of Valjevo of all ages.

== Layout ==
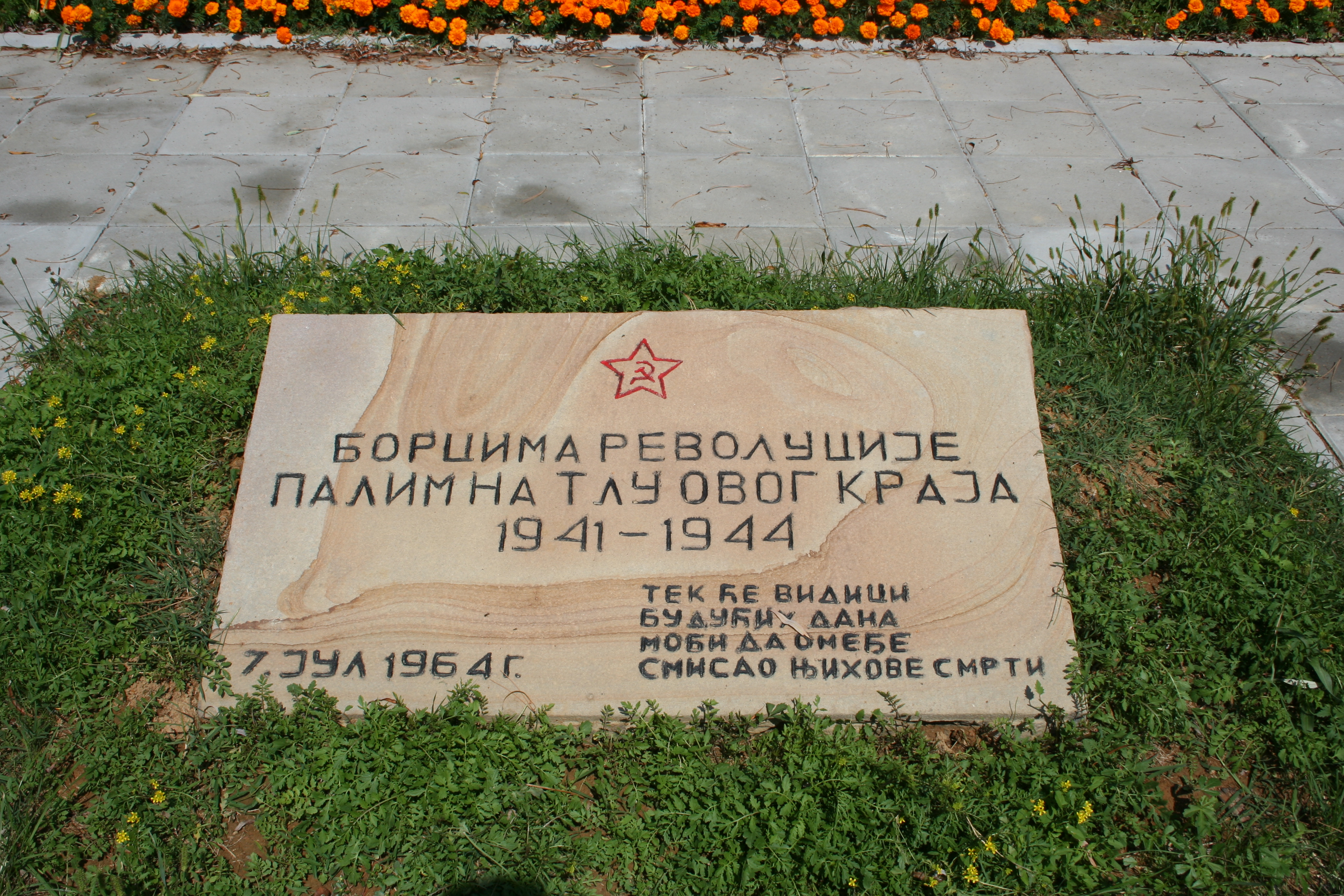
5. Memorial plaque in front of the flagpoles with the flags of Serbia and the city of Valjevo at the entrance to the cemetery

The Partisan Memorial Cemetery is located in the northwestern part of Valjevo, on Krušik Hill. It is shaped as an irregular triangle covering an area of 2.5 hectares, designed by architectural engineer Božidar Krković. The cemetery is enclosed by a hedge; at the main entrance, one of three entrances, flagpoles are placed, and in front of them a memorial plaque reading:

TO THE FIGHTERS OF THE REVOLUTION

FALLEN ON THE SOIL OF THIS REGION
1941–1944

7 JULY 1964 Only the horizons of future days will be able to measure the meaning of their death

(figs. 5 and 6)

The interior consists of a grassy area intersected by asphalt pedestrian paths along which memorial plaques—67 of them—are placed, as well as ornamental plants. The plaques are made of sandstone and bear text painted in black with the names of the executed fighters. Each plaque has a five-pointed star with a hammer and sickle carved in the upper left corner. The dimensions of the plaques are 120 × 70 × 40 cm. (figs. 7 to 14)

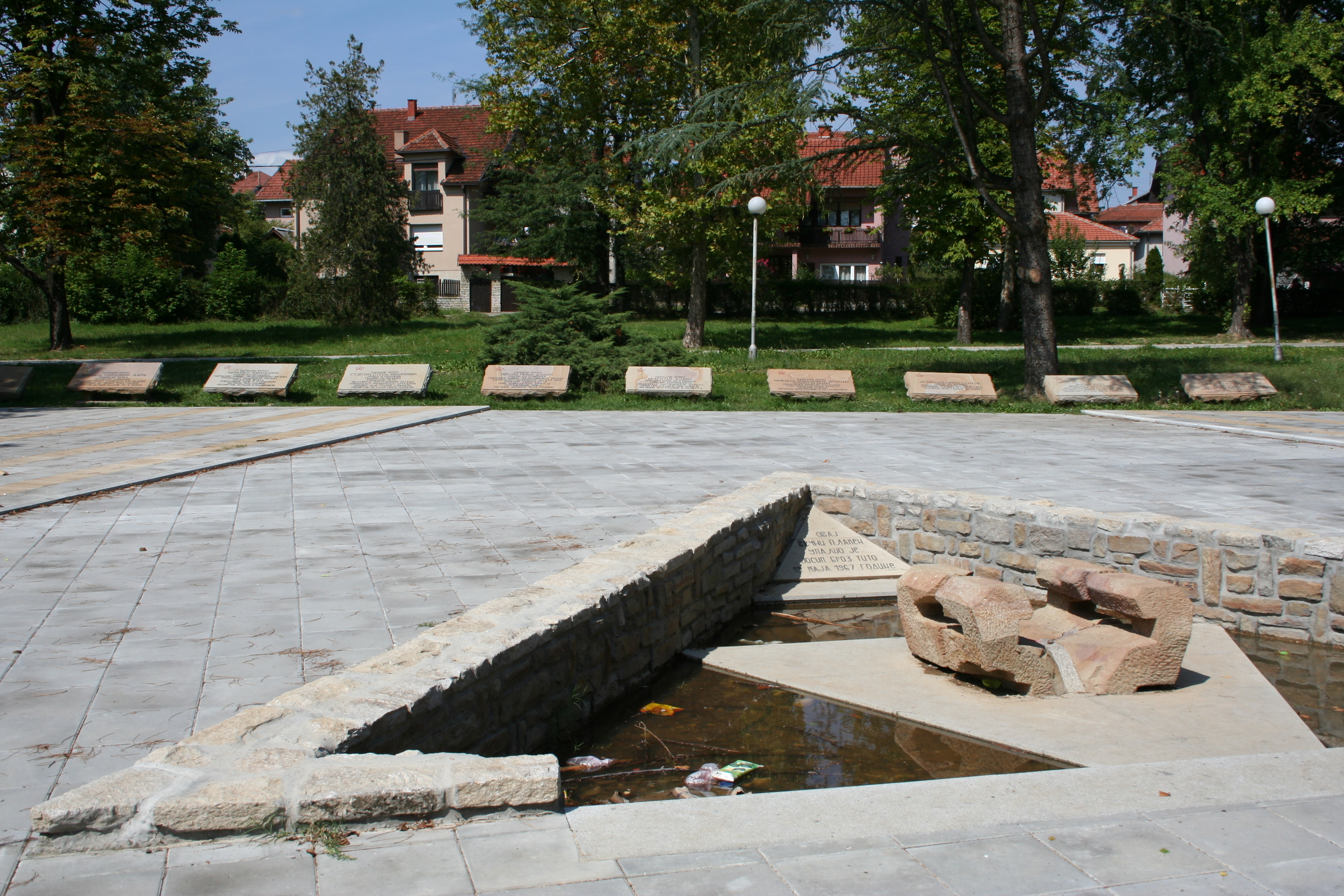
15. The eternal flame in the central part of the cemetery; in front are plaques with the names of national heroes from Valjevo and its surroundings or who fell here

In the central part of the cemetery, there is a monument with a torch and an eternal flame, the work of academic sculptor Milica Bogunović. The torch is made of metal, and the surrounding space is walled with sandstone blocks in the shape of a triangle, with the inscription:

THIS

ETERNAL FLAME
WAS LIT BY
JOSIP BROZ TITO

ON 18 MAY 1967.

(figs. 15 to 18)

In the central part, above the eternal flame, on granite slabs are carved the names of fallen national heroes from the Valjevo area. (figs. 19 to 28)

Monuments dedicated to those shot on 27 November, made of stone and concrete, are placed at all three access sides to the memorial park. While the monument at the main entrance was erected later and is more modern in design, the other two monuments in the remaining corners of the park were erected significantly earlier and are pyramidal in shape. On the latter two, white marble memorial plaques measuring 120 × 30 cm are installed with an inscription of identical content. (figs. 29 to 36) On the first of the two, the text reads: "At this place on 27 November 1941, the German occupiers together with traitorous Chetnik bands shot 121 Partisans."

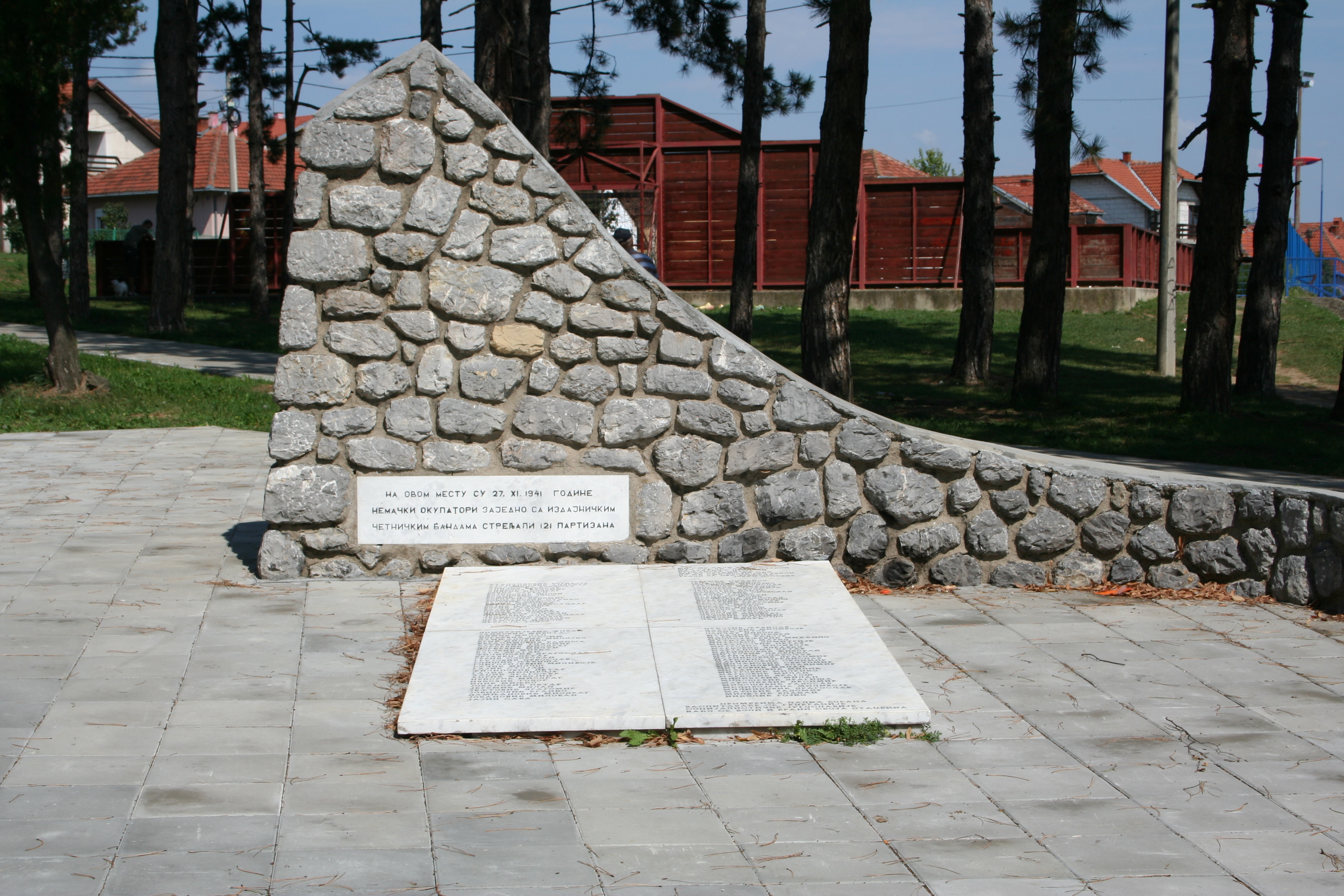
29. Pyramidal monument with memorial plaque and plaque with names of the executed in front

On the second, the same text is written, but instead of 121, it states that 140 Partisans were shot there. Below these memorial pyramids are monuments of white marble in the shape of a sarcophagus, on the top of which the names of the executed are inscribed. At the top is a marble five-pointed star, and below it is carved the following verse by the poet and revolutionary Jovan Popović:

We fell for what

you have forever gained,
so that each new generation
carries the torch forward
We are not silent even now,
we have spoken our word,

spoken for all time

The more recent monument at the main entrance is rectangular in shape and bears newer memorial plaques dedicated to the fighters of the 6th Lika Division "Nikola Tesla" who fell in the battles for the liberation of Valjevo and its surroundings in September 1944. These plaques were installed on 27 November 1999 by surviving fighters of this division and grateful citizens of Valjevo. Next to it is a new monument of black marble, erected by Valjevo SUBNOR on 15 September 2014, dedicated to fallen fighters of the 1st Proletarian Brigade in the battles for the liberation of Valjevo and to the fighters of Valjevo. (figs. 37 to 40)

Within this memorial cemetery there is also a monument erected at the place where the Germans shot 18 hostages from the Valjevo area on 18 September 1943.

=== National Heroes ===
List of national heroes who were born or fought and fell in the Valjevo area, and to whom a memorial plaque was placed at the memorial cemetery:

- Žikica Jovanović Španac
- Dragojlo Dudić
- Miloš Dudić
- Stjepan Filipović
- Živan Đurđević
- Milica Pavlović Dara
- Zdravko Jovanović
- Sava Vujanović Žuća
- Bogdan Bolta
- Miša Pantić

== Gallery ==
=== Visit of Tito to the cemetery ===
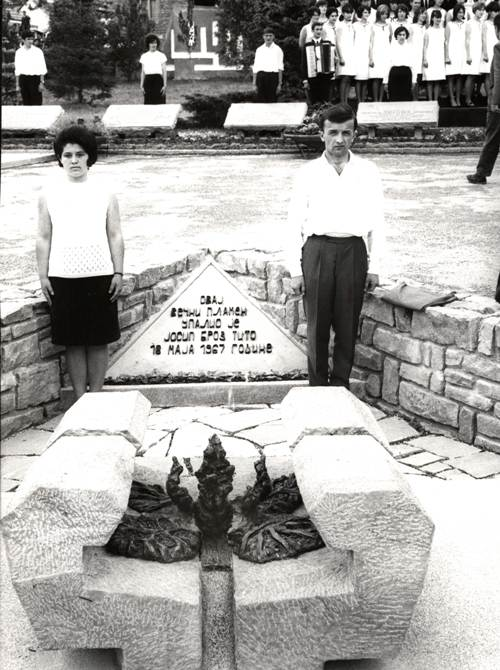
3.

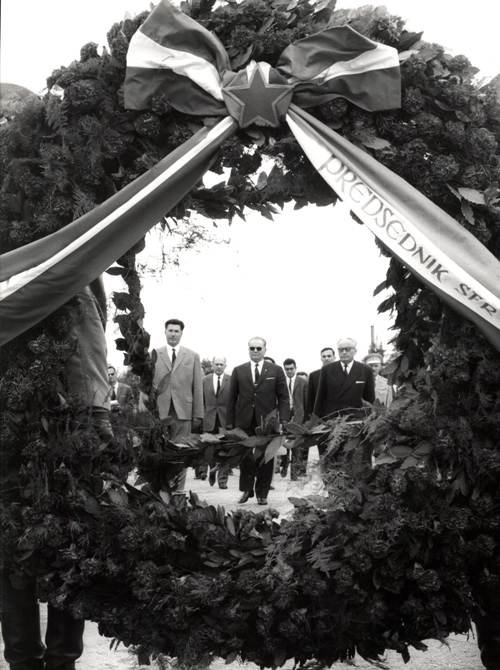
4.

=== Appearance of the monument ===
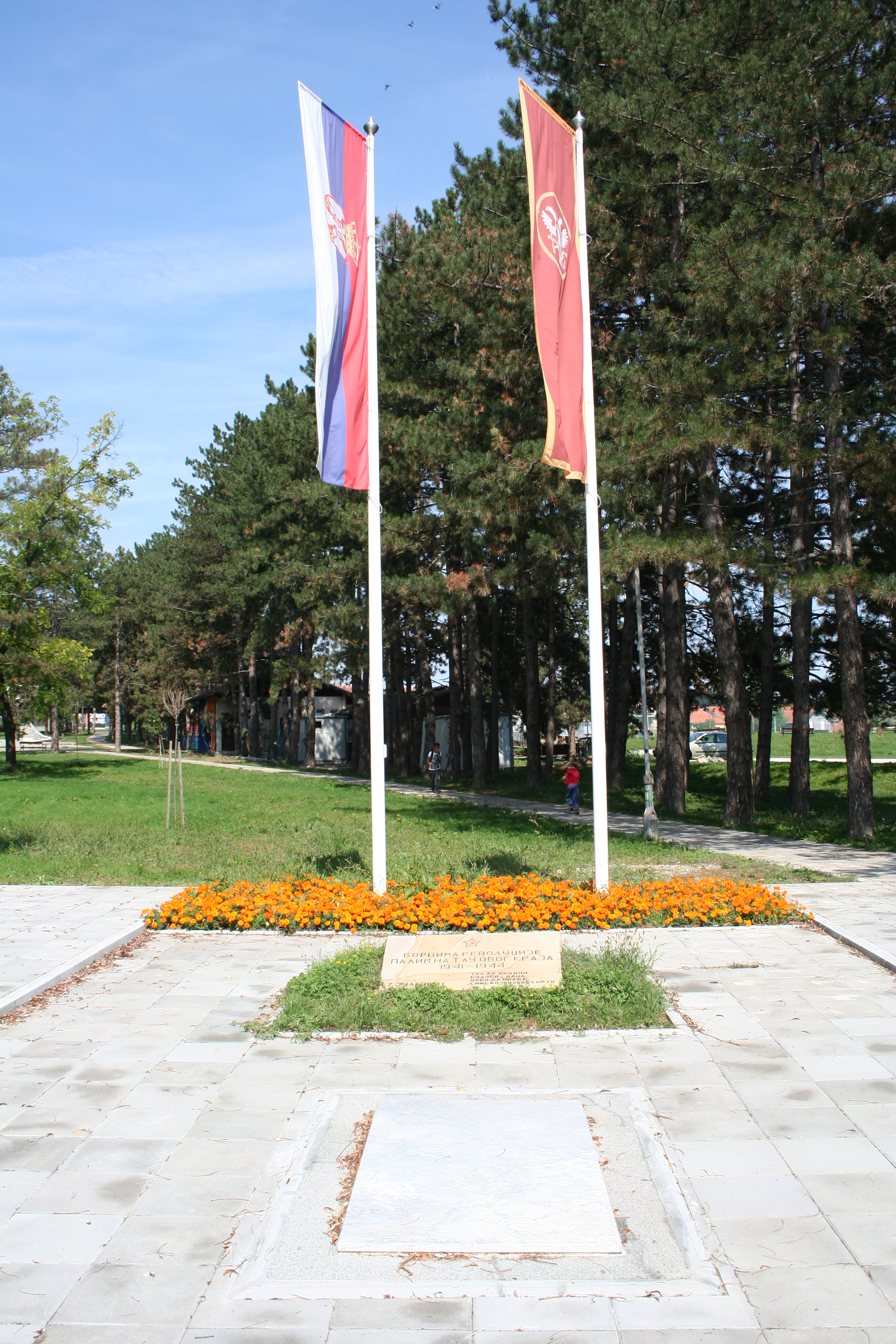
6. Flagpoles with the flag of Serbia and the flag of the city of Valjevo at the entrance to the memorial park. In front of the flagpoles is the memorial plaque with the mentioned text.

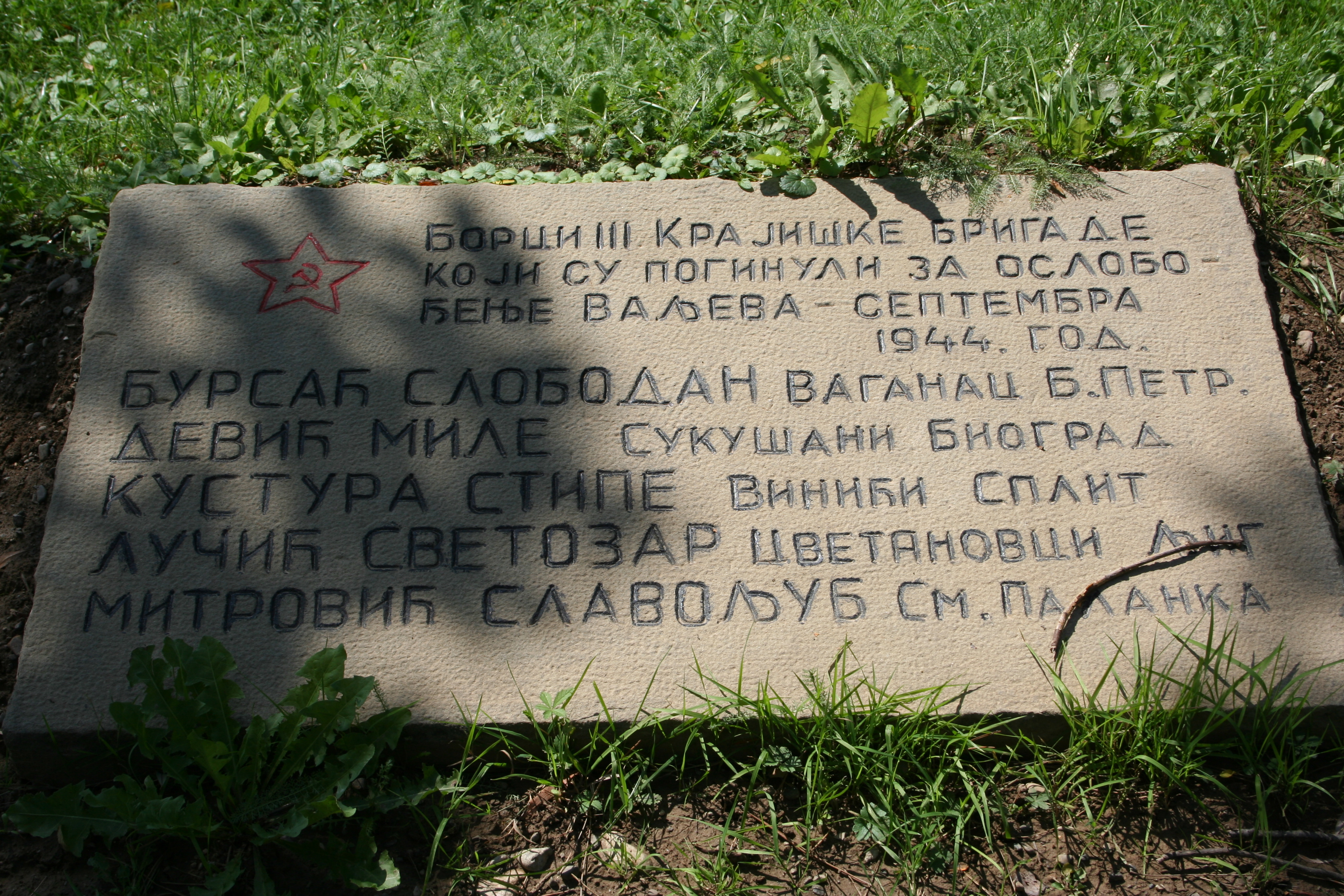
7. Some of the 67 memorial plaques dedicated to the fallen, placed along the paths in the park

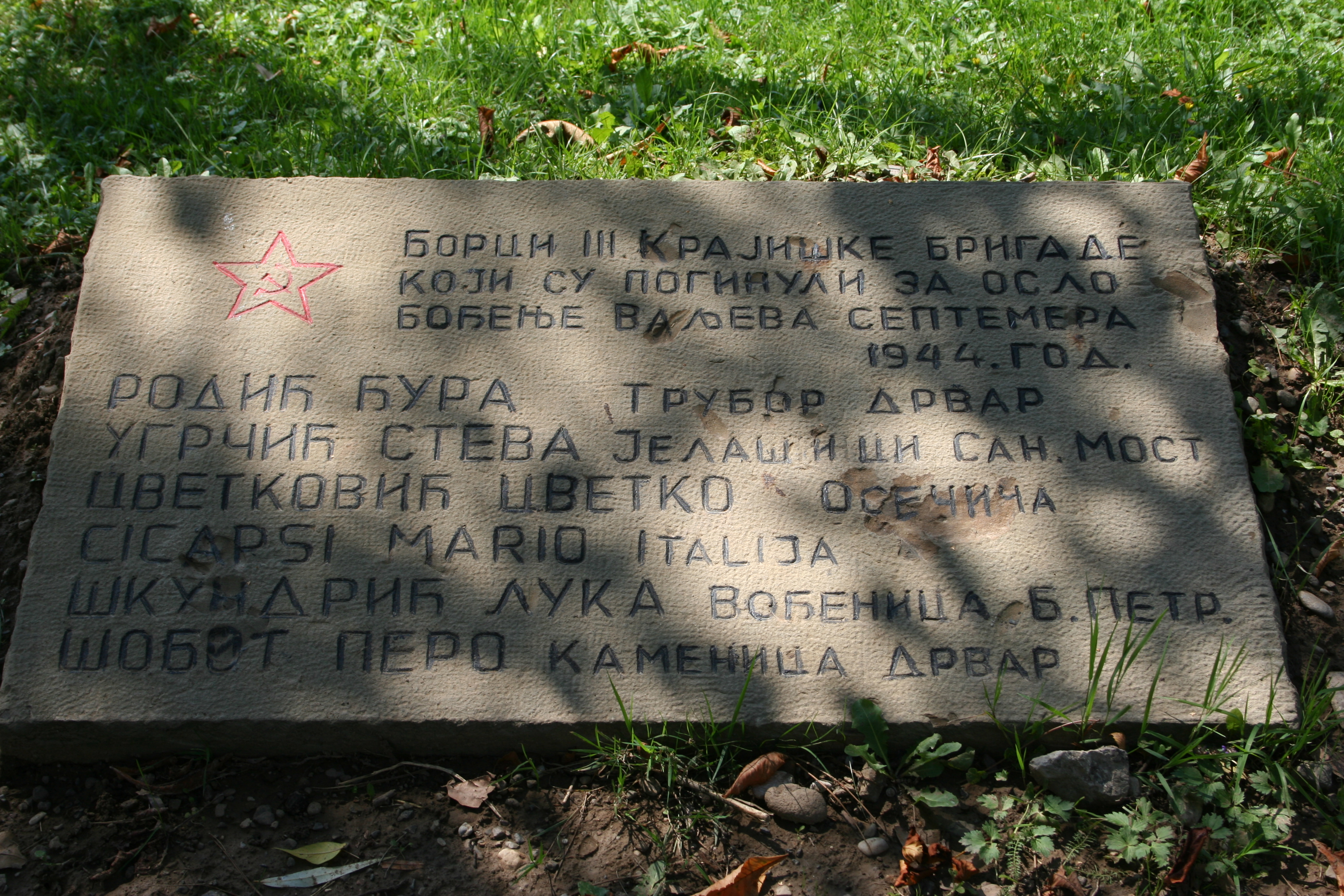
8.

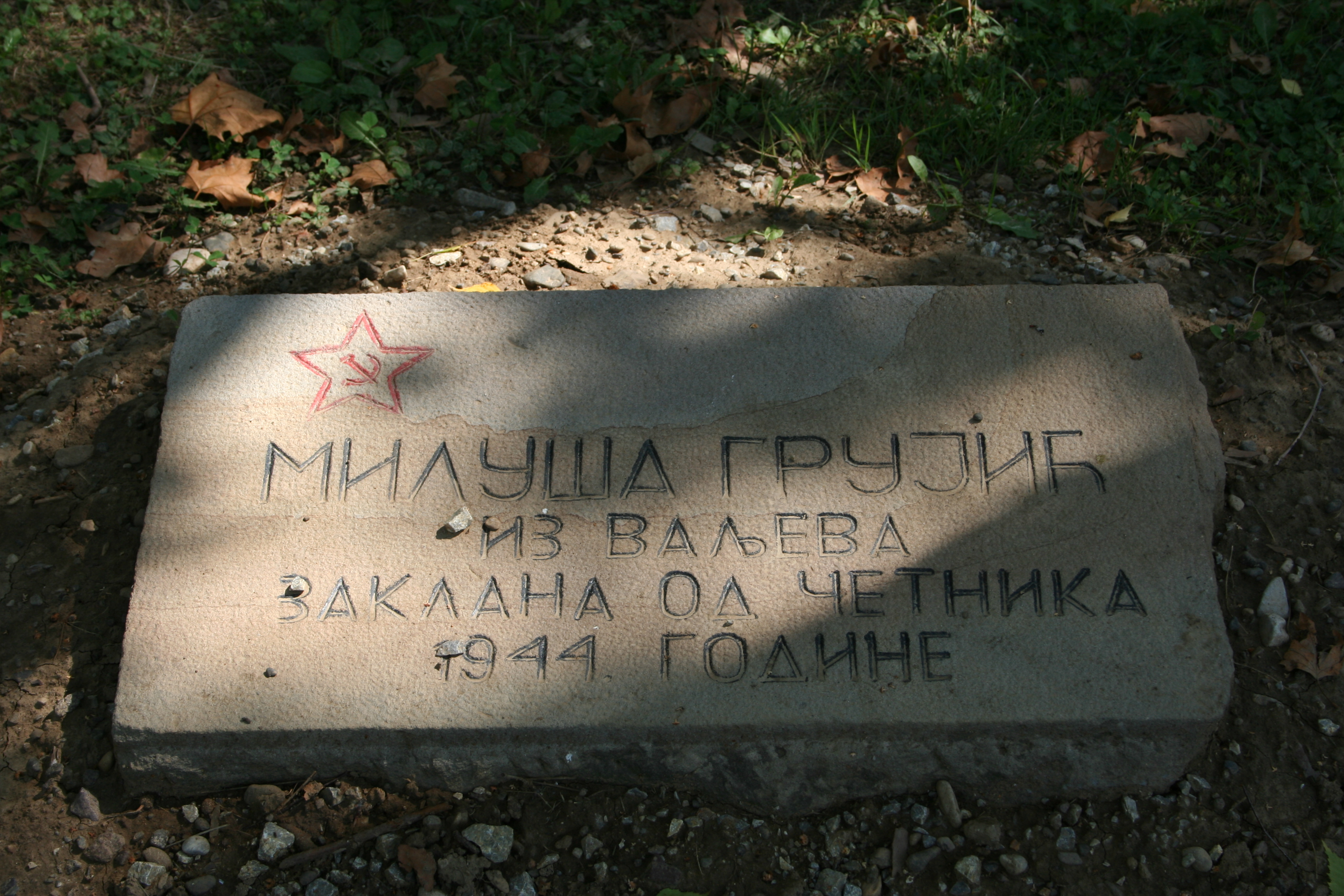
9.

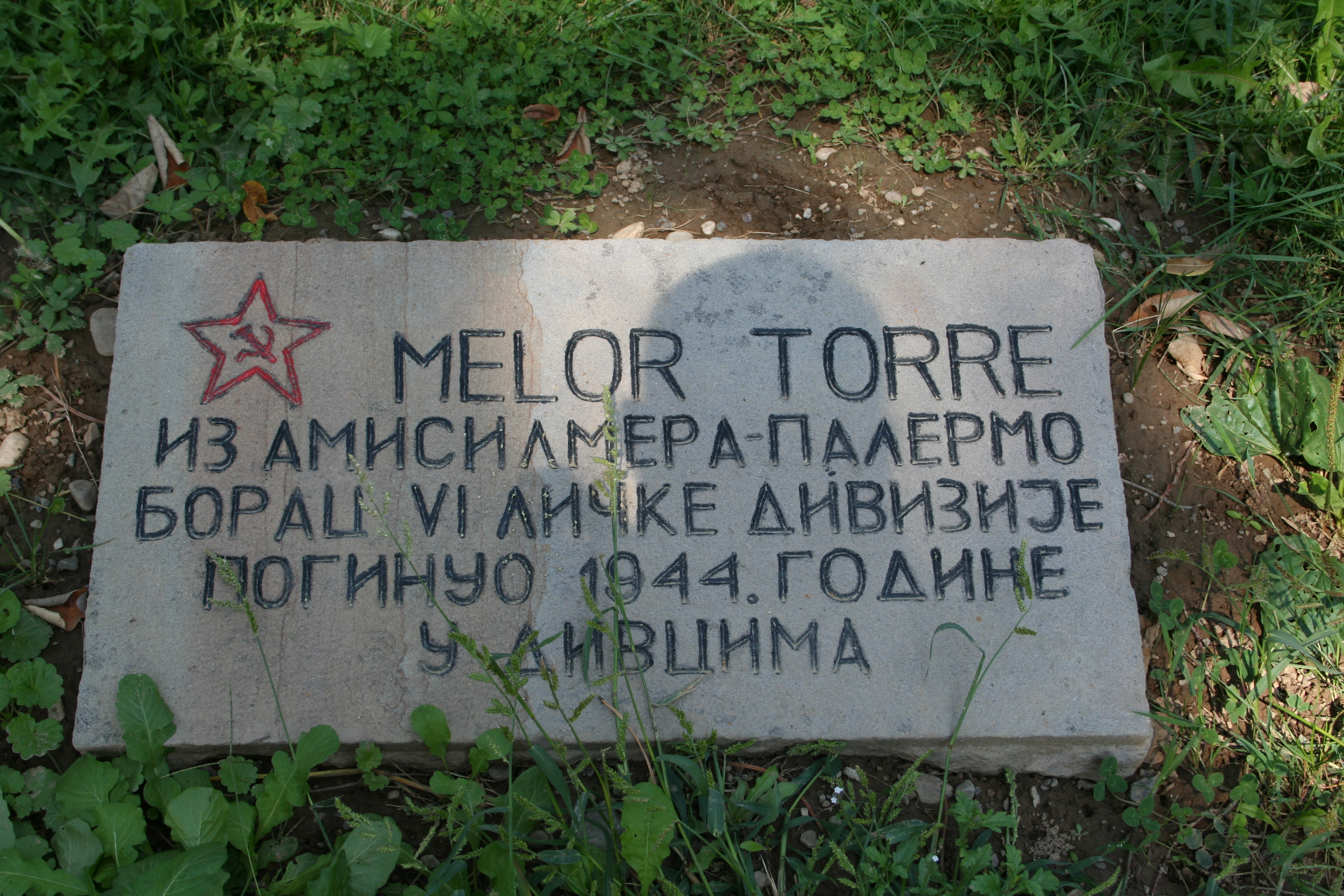
10.

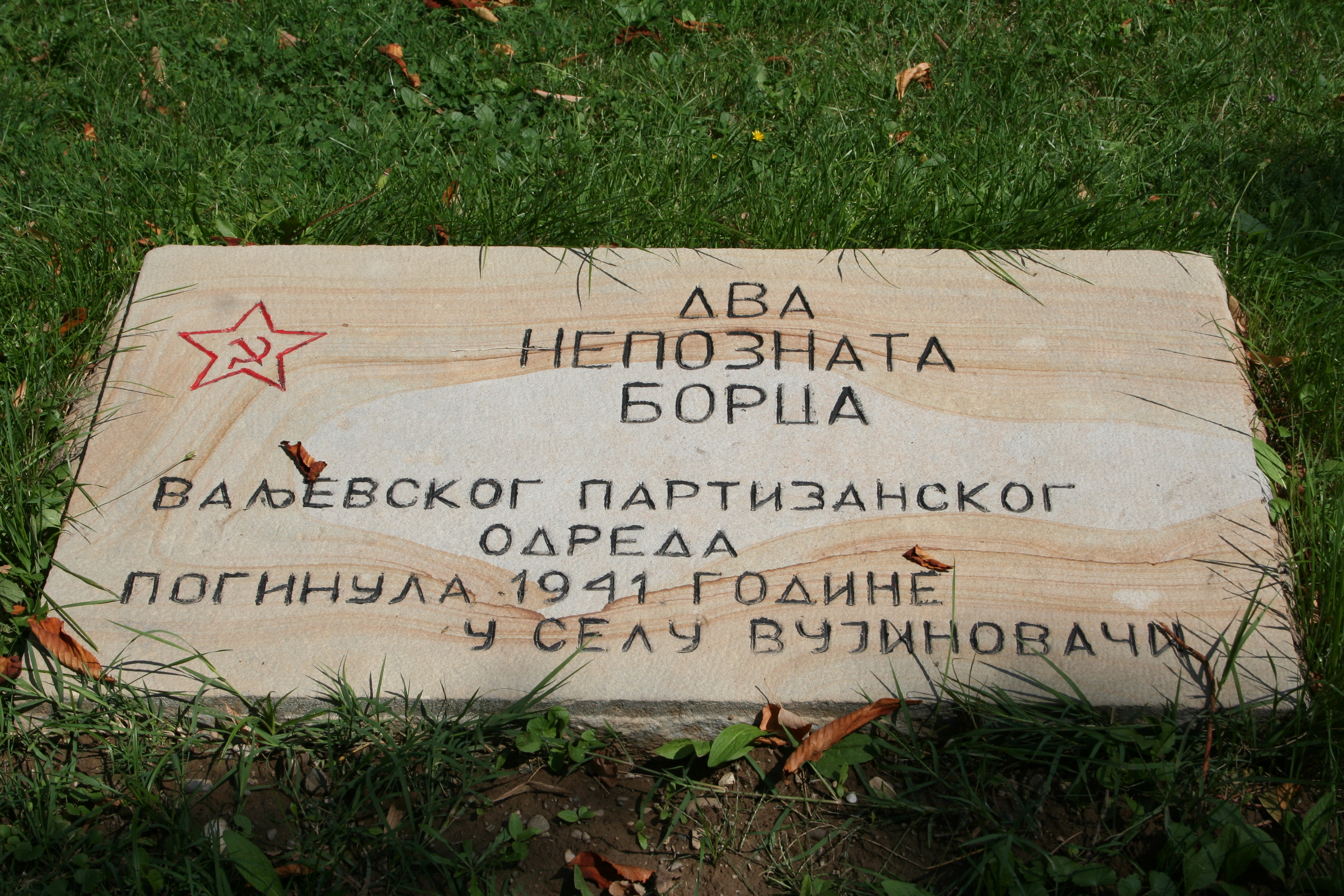
11.

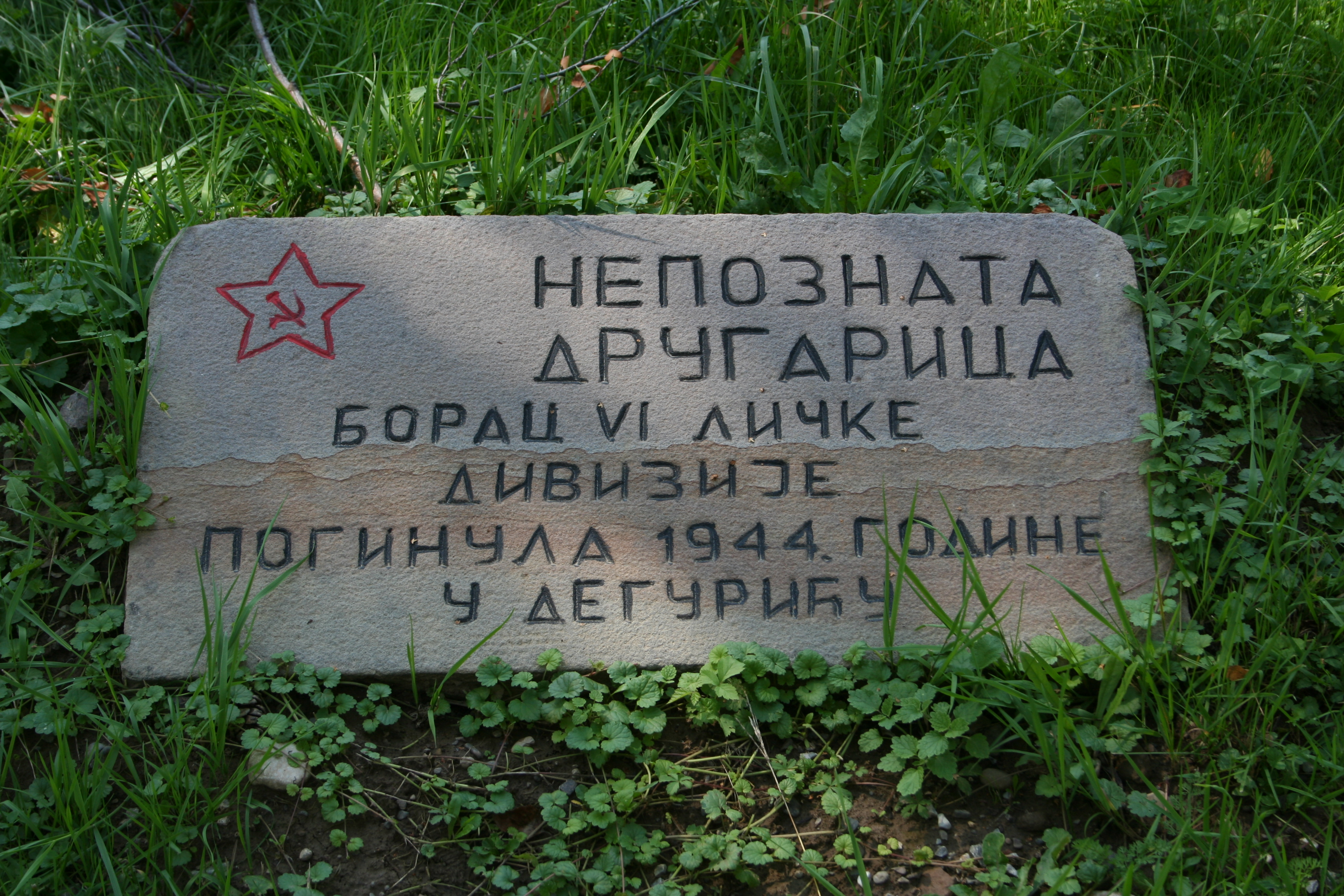
12.

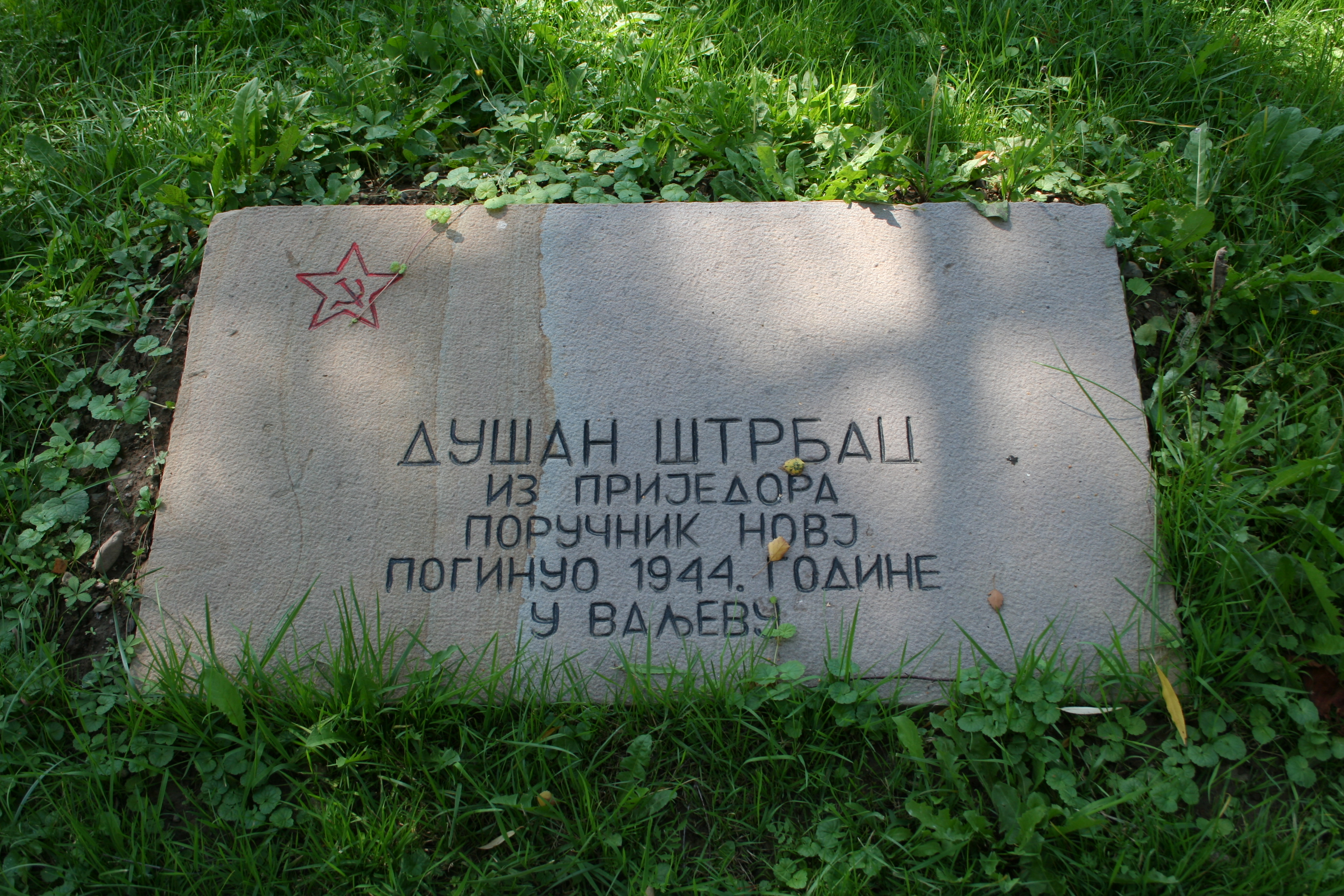
13.

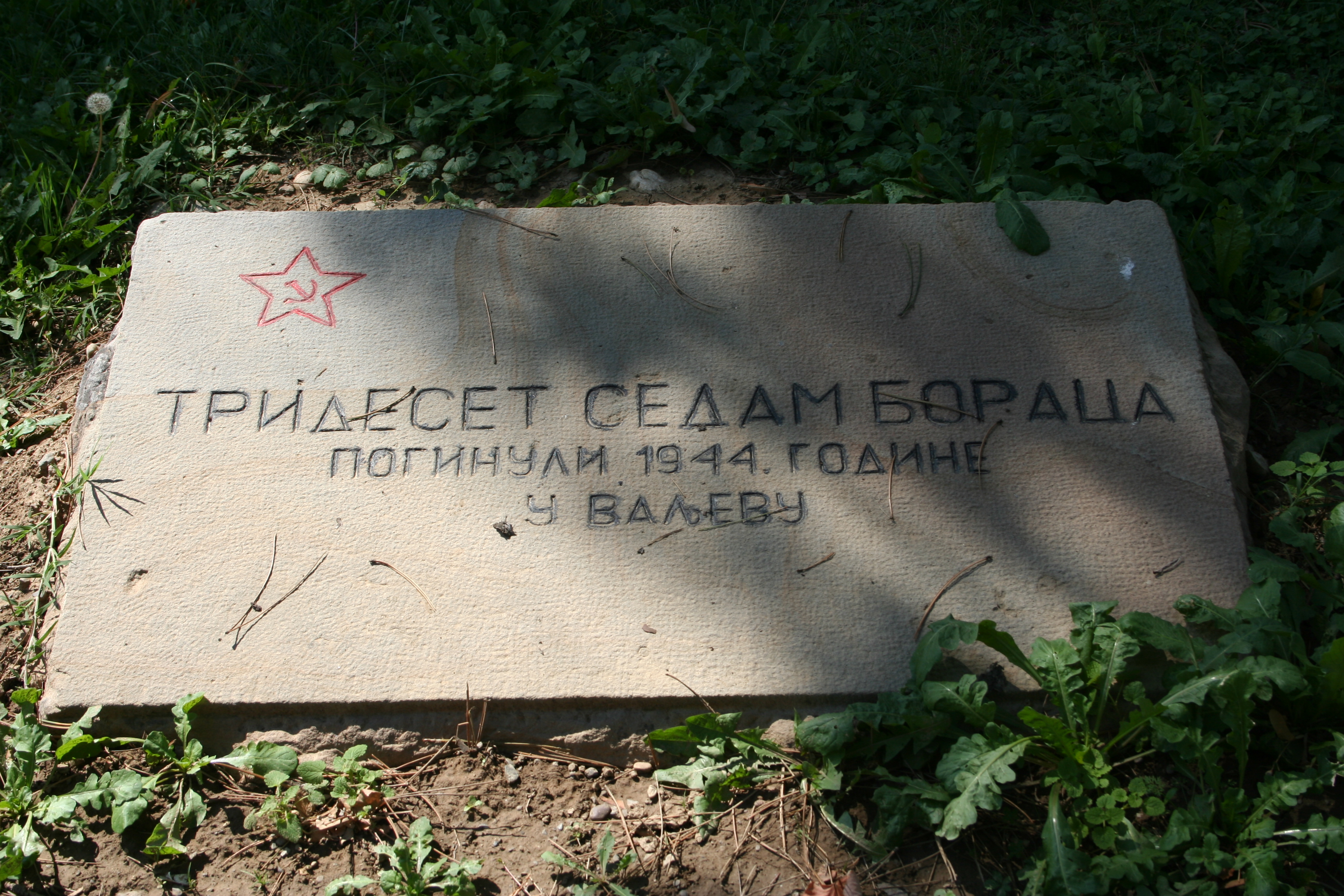
14.

==== The eternal flame ====
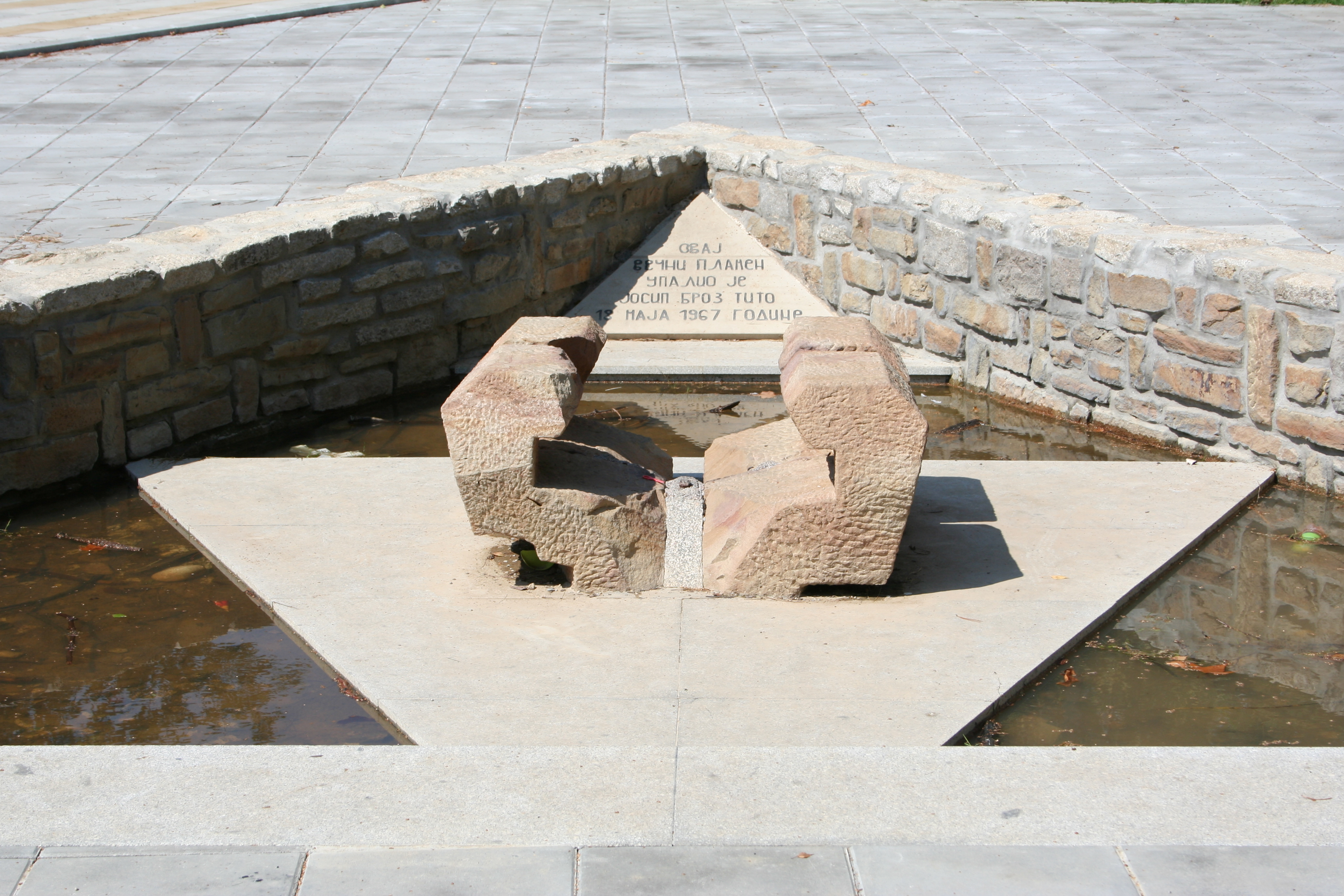
16. The eternal flame in the central part of the cemetery

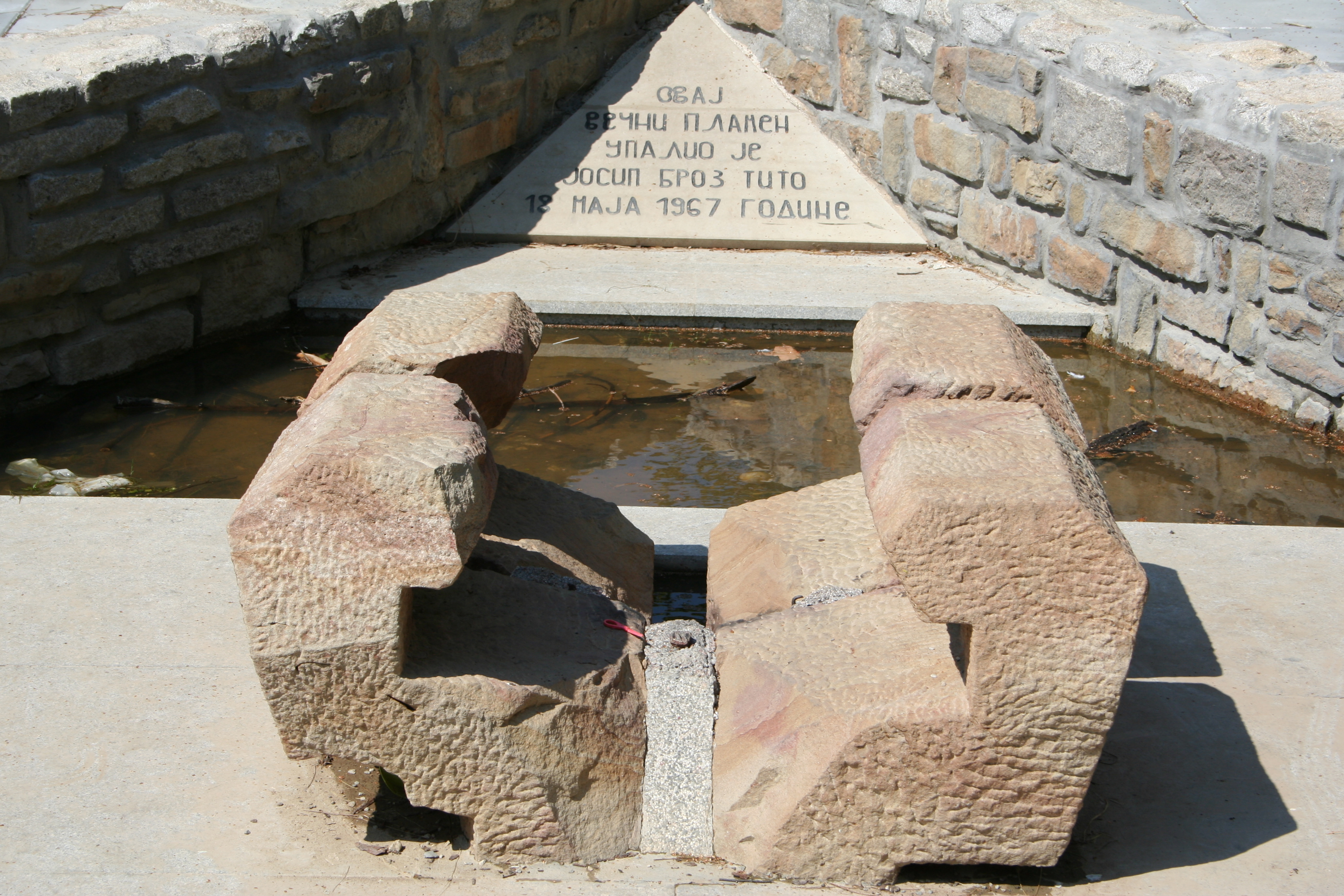
17.

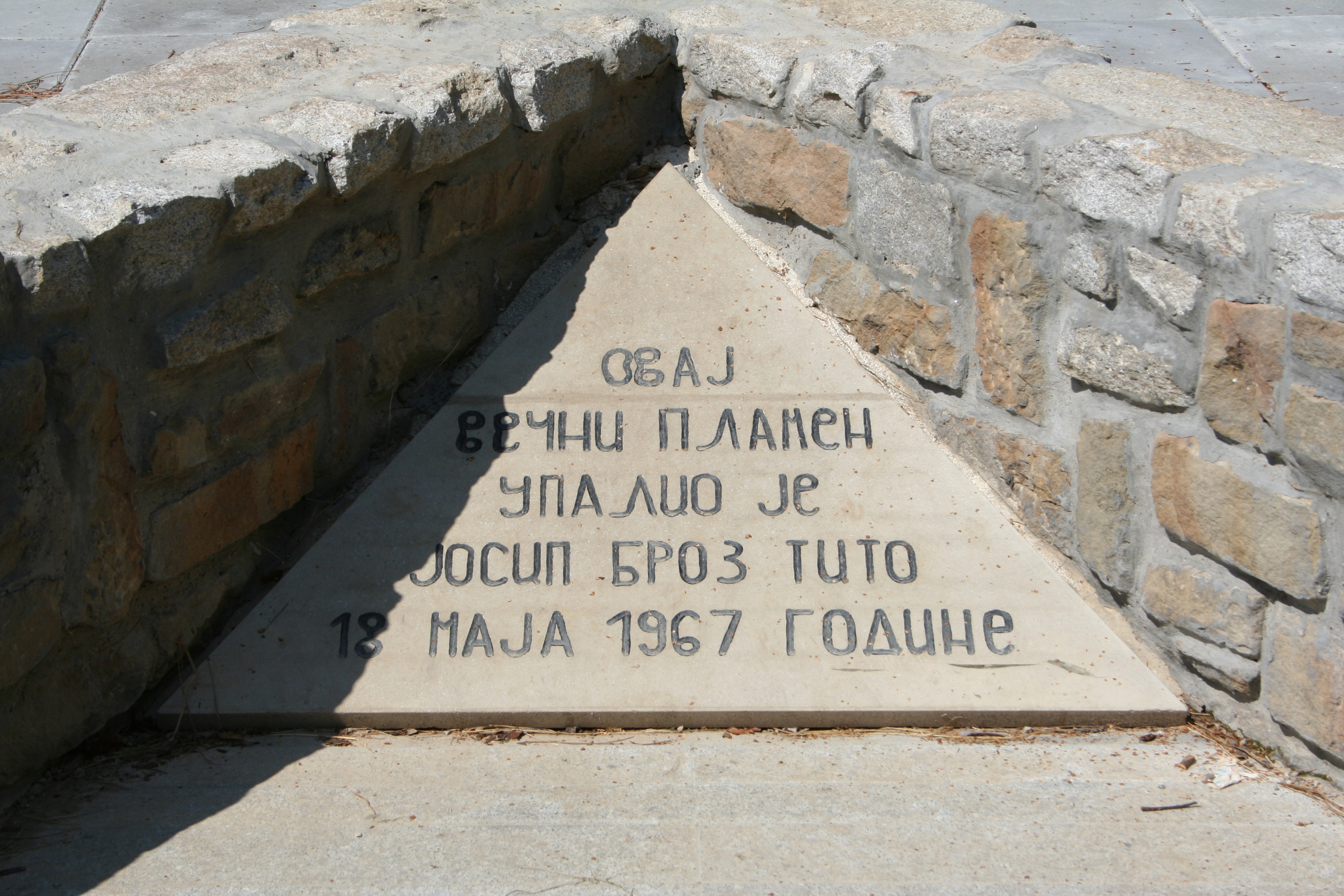
18. The inscription in the upper corner of the triangular flame monument

=== Memorial plaques of national heroes ===
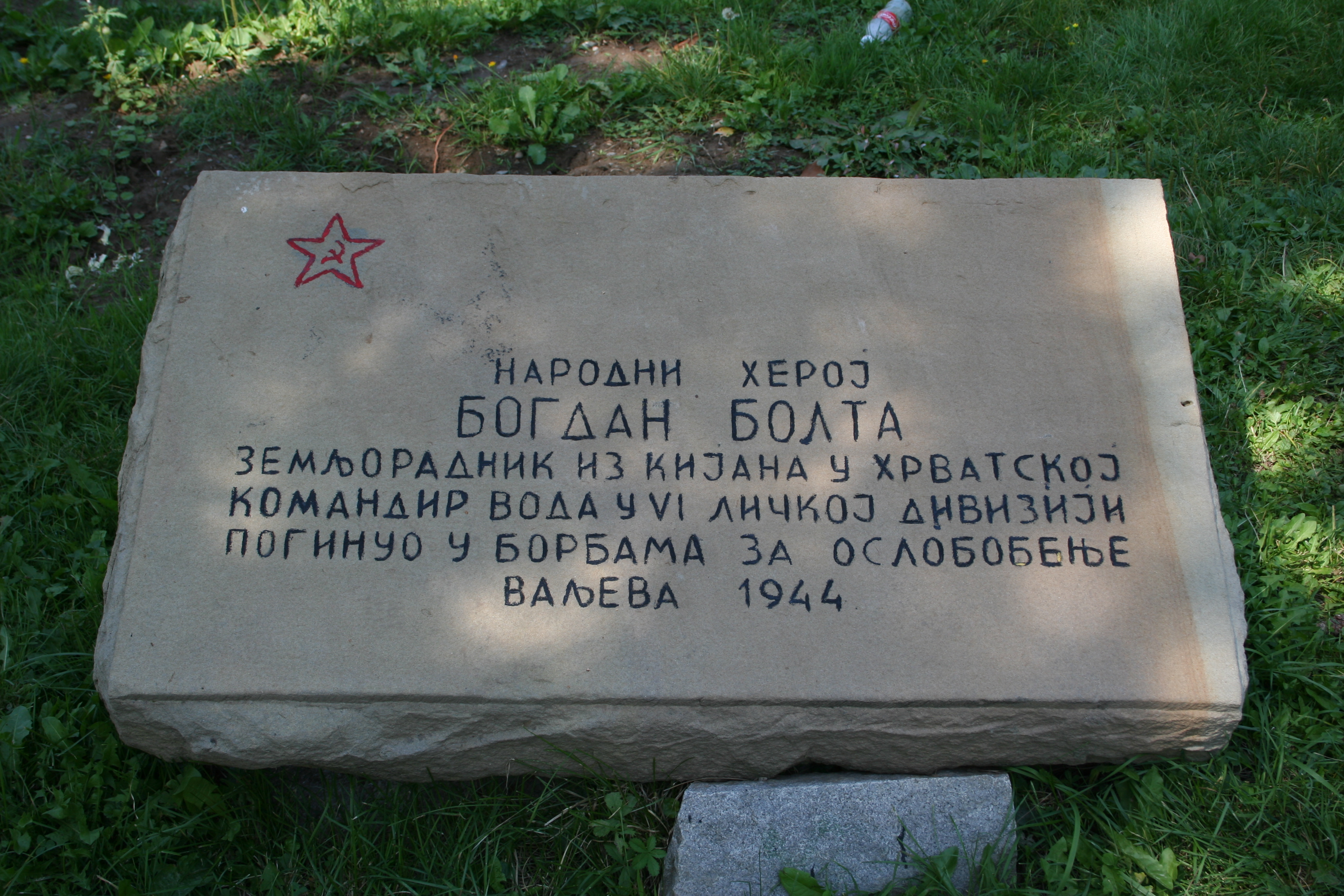
19. Memorial plaque to Bogdan Bolta – a bomber and machine gunner, platoon commander in the 1st Lika Proletarian Brigade; killed in battle with Chetniks in Bačevci near Valjevo in 1944

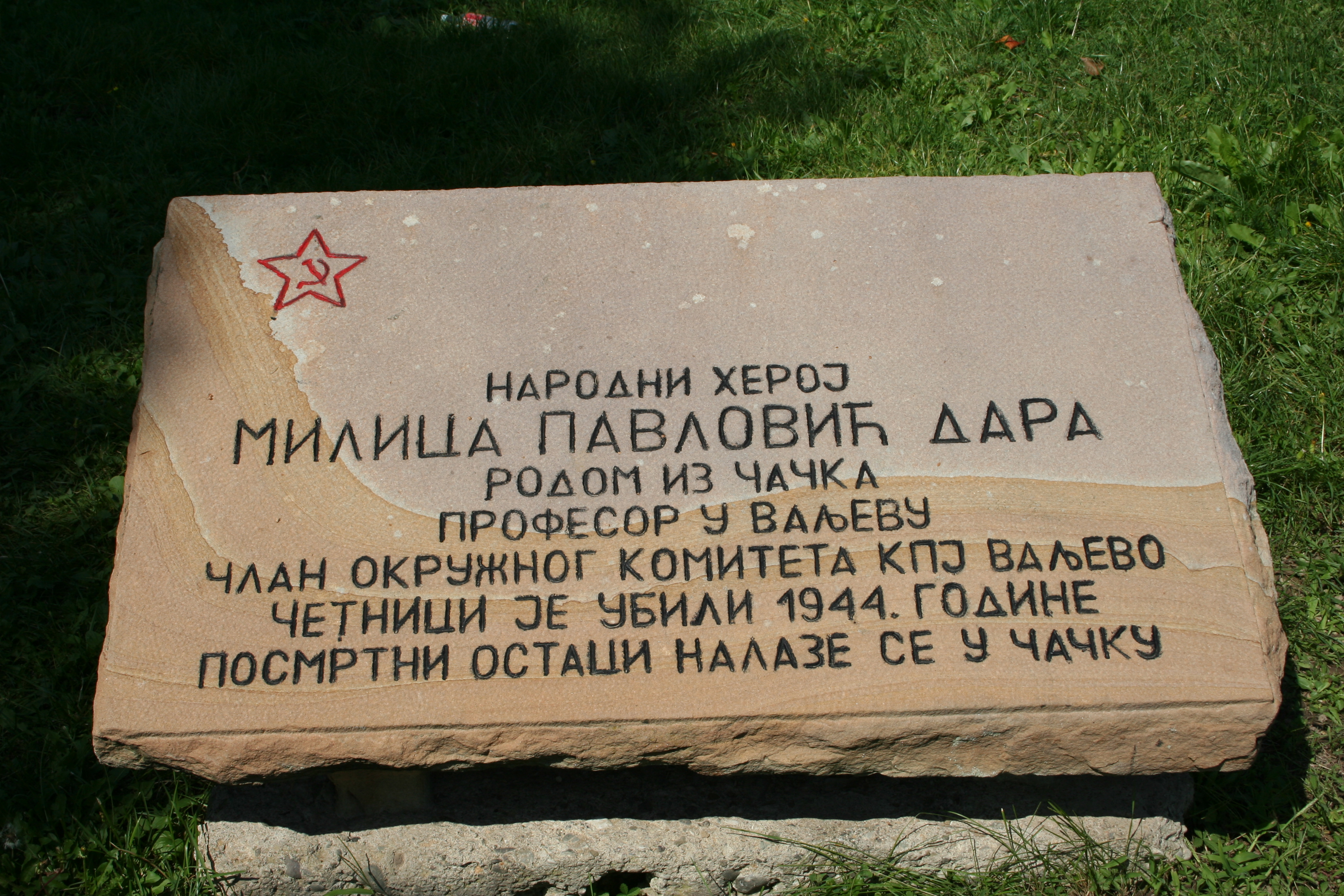
20. Memorial plaque to Milica Pavlović Dara – a teacher and secretary of the District Committee of the Communist Party of Yugoslavia for Valjevo; killed by Chetniks in captivity in Lelić near Valjevo in 1944

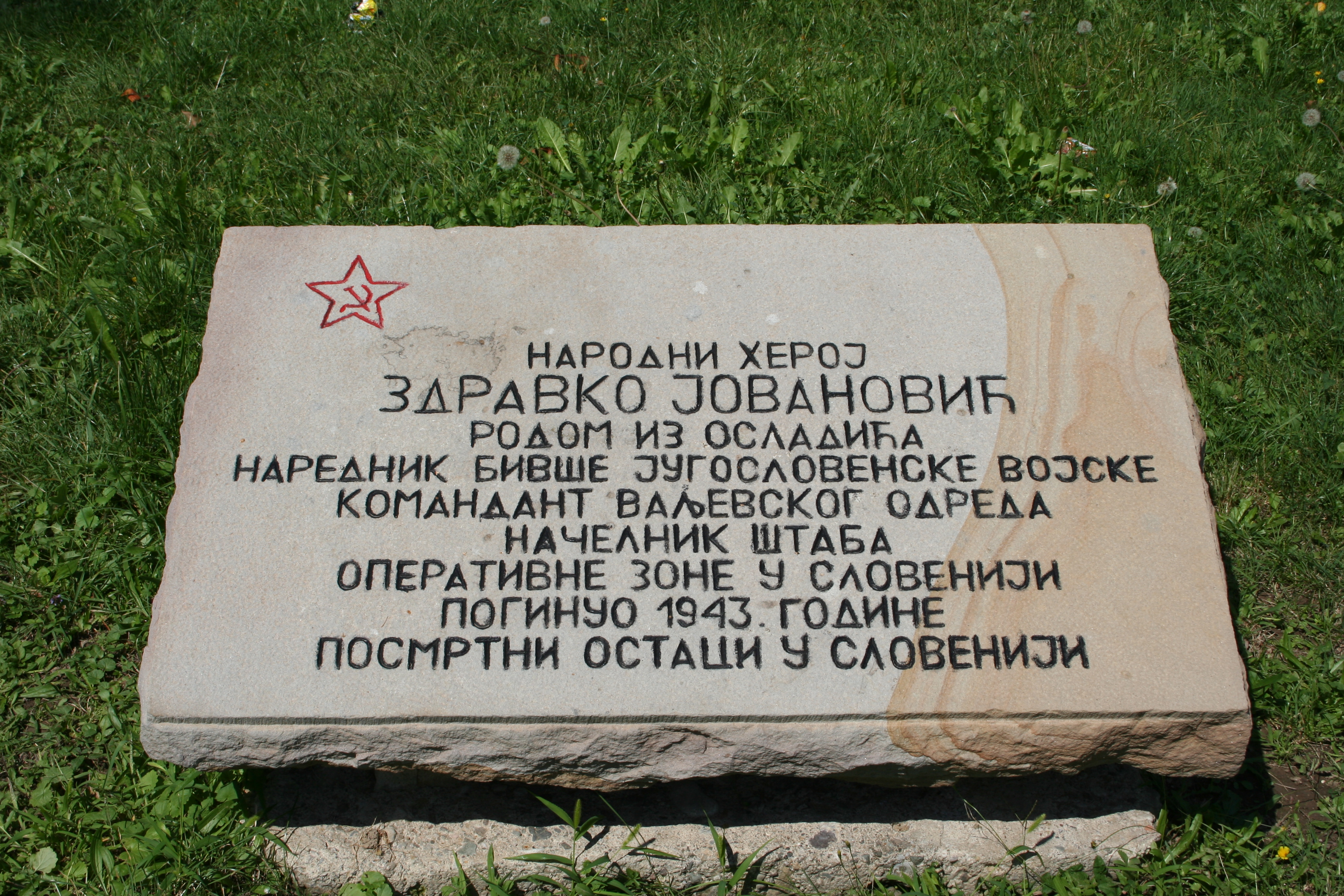
21. Memorial plaque to Zdravko Jovanović – the first commander of the Valjevo Partisan Detachment; killed in Dednik near Velike Lašče in Slovenia in 1943

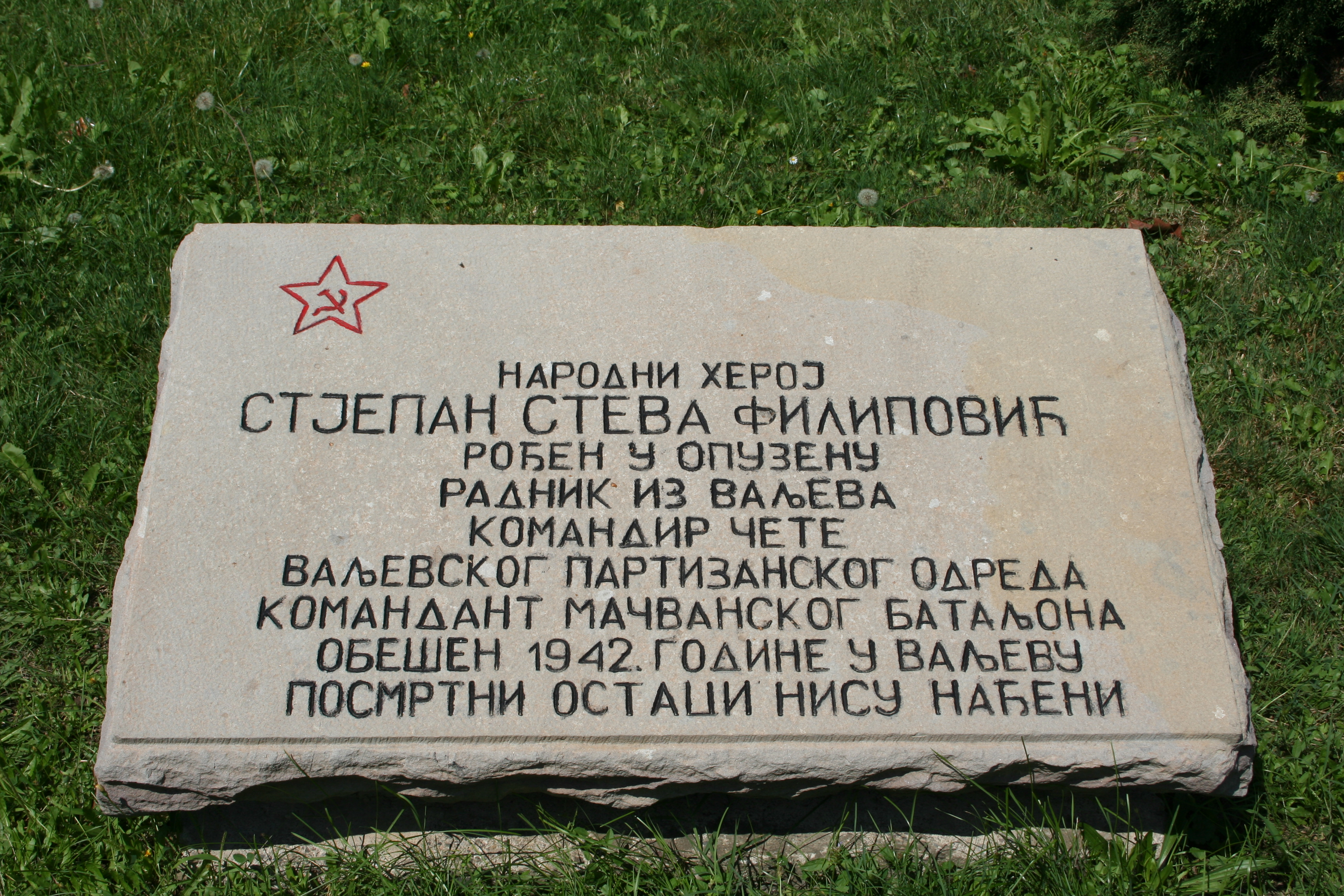
22. Memorial plaque to Stjepan Filipović – a famous Partisan known for his speech under the gallows in Valjevo on 22 May 1942 and the photograph taken at that moment, a symbol of the fight against fascism

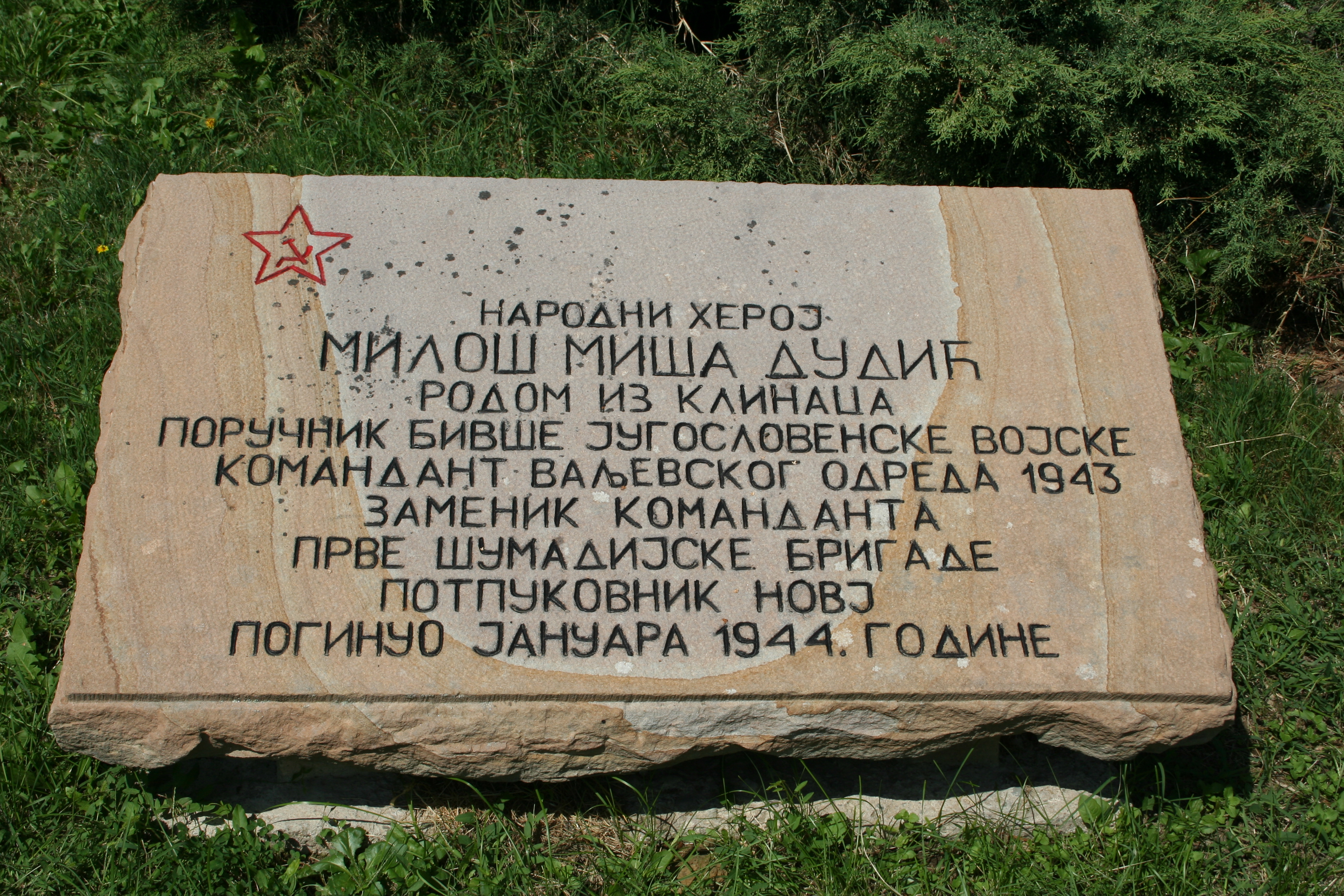
23. Memorial plaque to Miloš Dudić – participant in the 1941 uprising, a renowned commander of the Valjevo Partisan Detachment

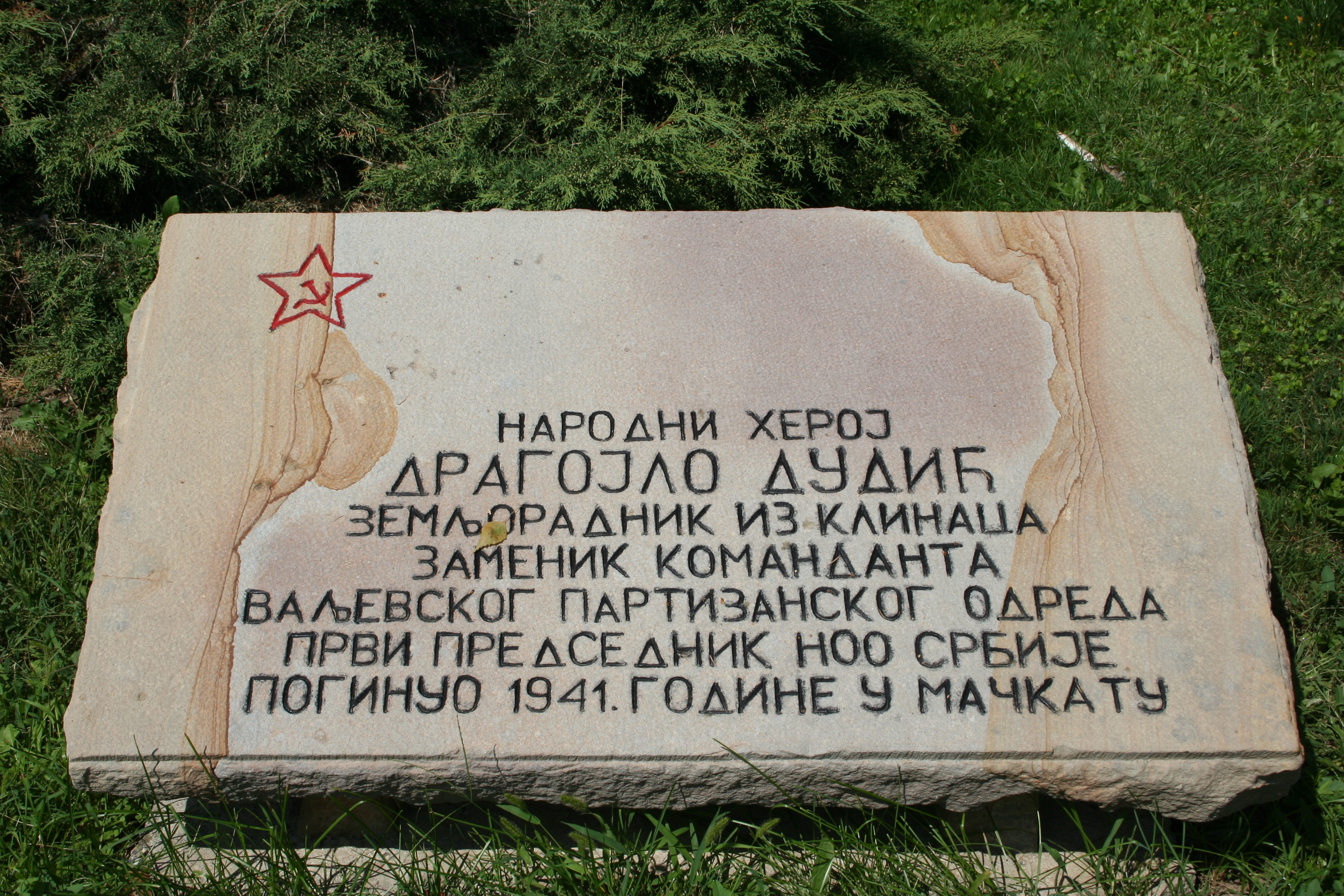
24. Memorial plaque to Dragojlo Dudić – a pre-war communist, peasant and writer, the first president of the Main People's Liberation Committee of Serbia from November 1941, father of Miloš Dudić

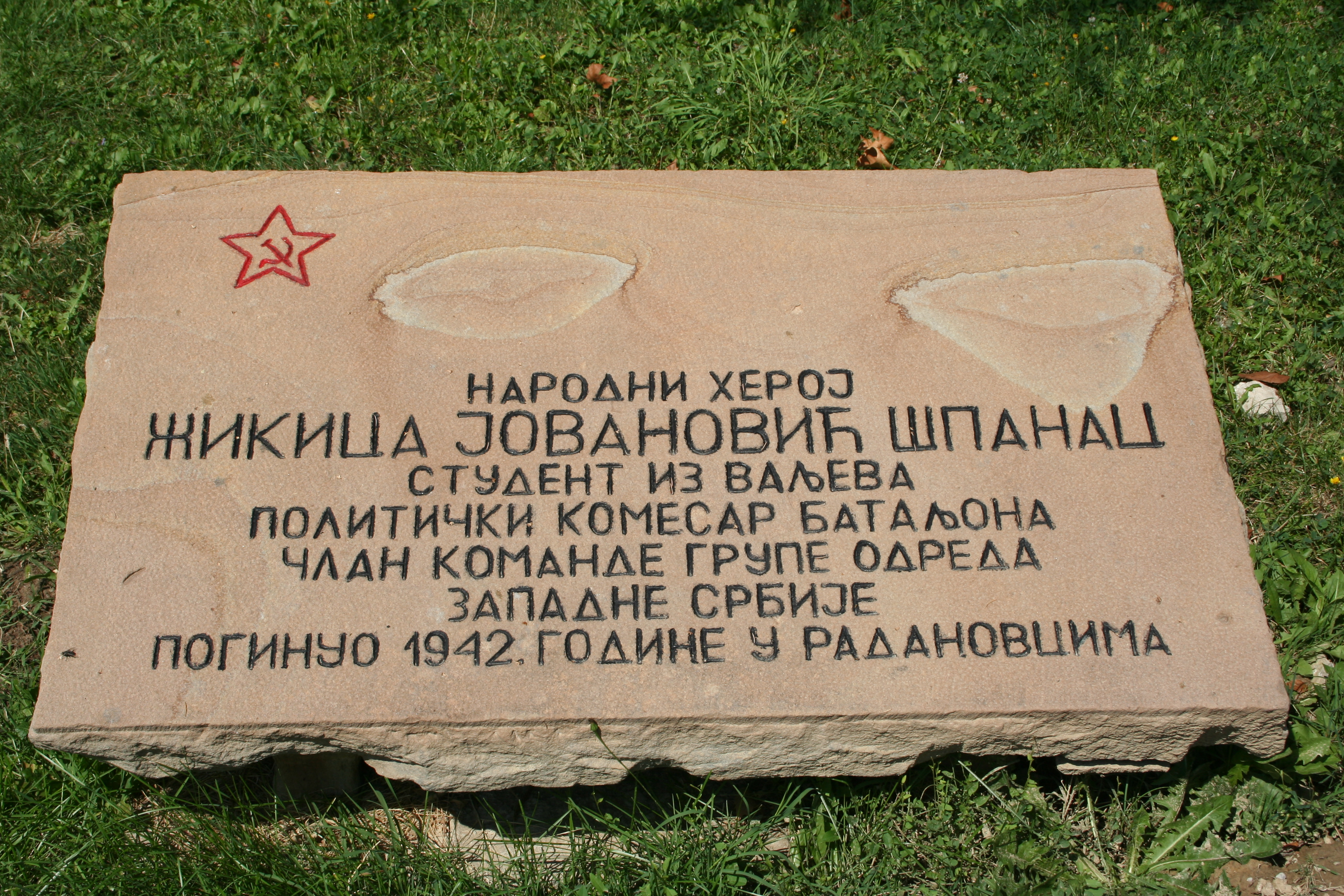
25. Memorial plaque to Žikica Jovanović Španac – a Spanish fighter, one of the organizers of the 1941 uprising in western Serbia

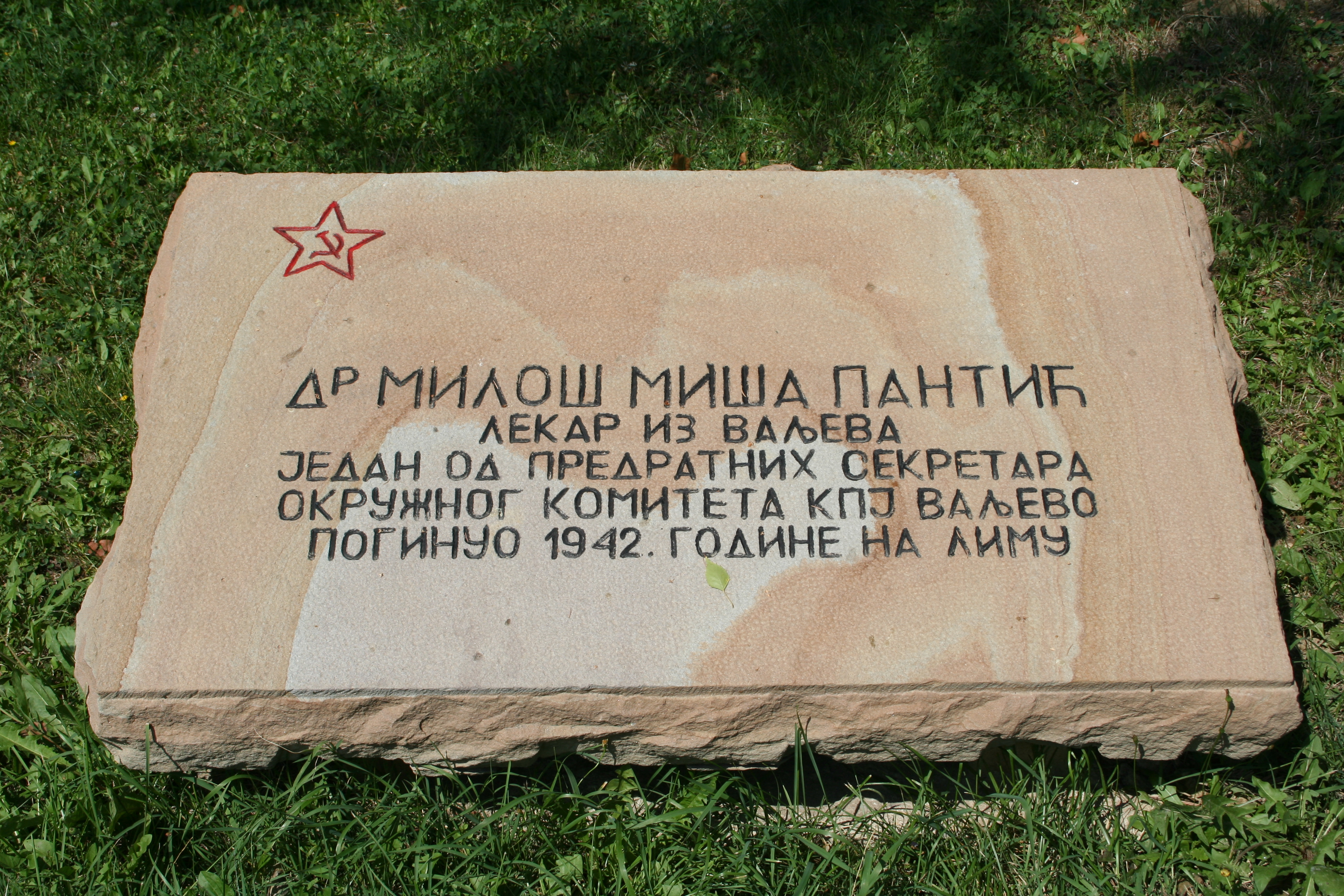
26. Memorial plaque to Dr. Miša Pantić – a physician, one of the leaders of Valjevo communists in the interwar period and one of the organizers of the 1941 uprising; the only person not proclaimed a People's Hero of Yugoslavia who has a memorial plaque among national heroes at the cemetery

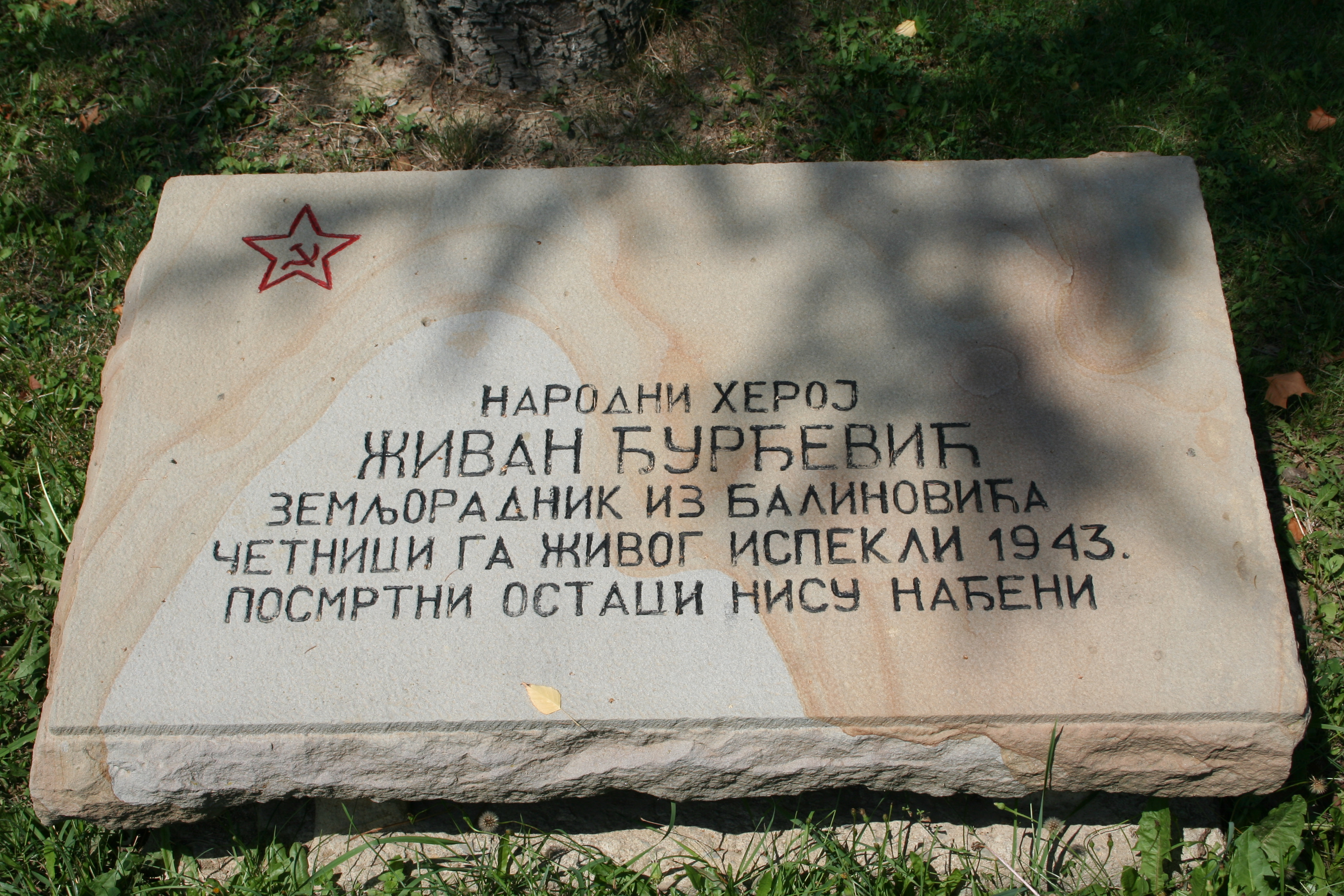
27. Memorial plaque to Živan Đurđević – a farmer and helper of the Partisan movement in the Valjevo area; died a terrible death at the hands of Chetniks in May 1943

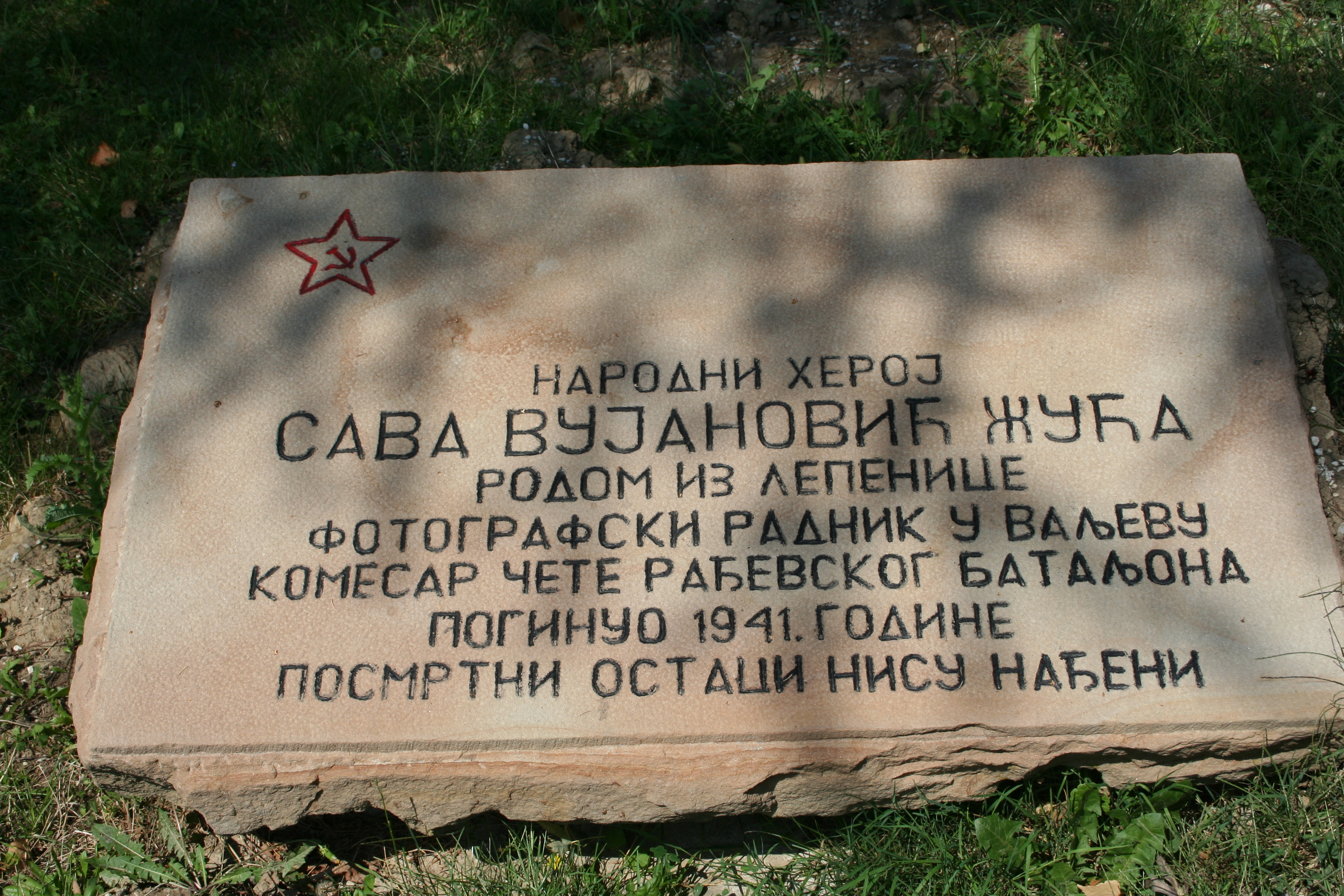
28. Memorial plaque to Sava Vujanović Žuća – a photographic worker, pre-war member of the SKOJ; died at the hands of Chetniks in the swollen Drina near Ljubovija

=== Monuments at the entrances to the cemetery ===
==== Monuments at the side entrances ====
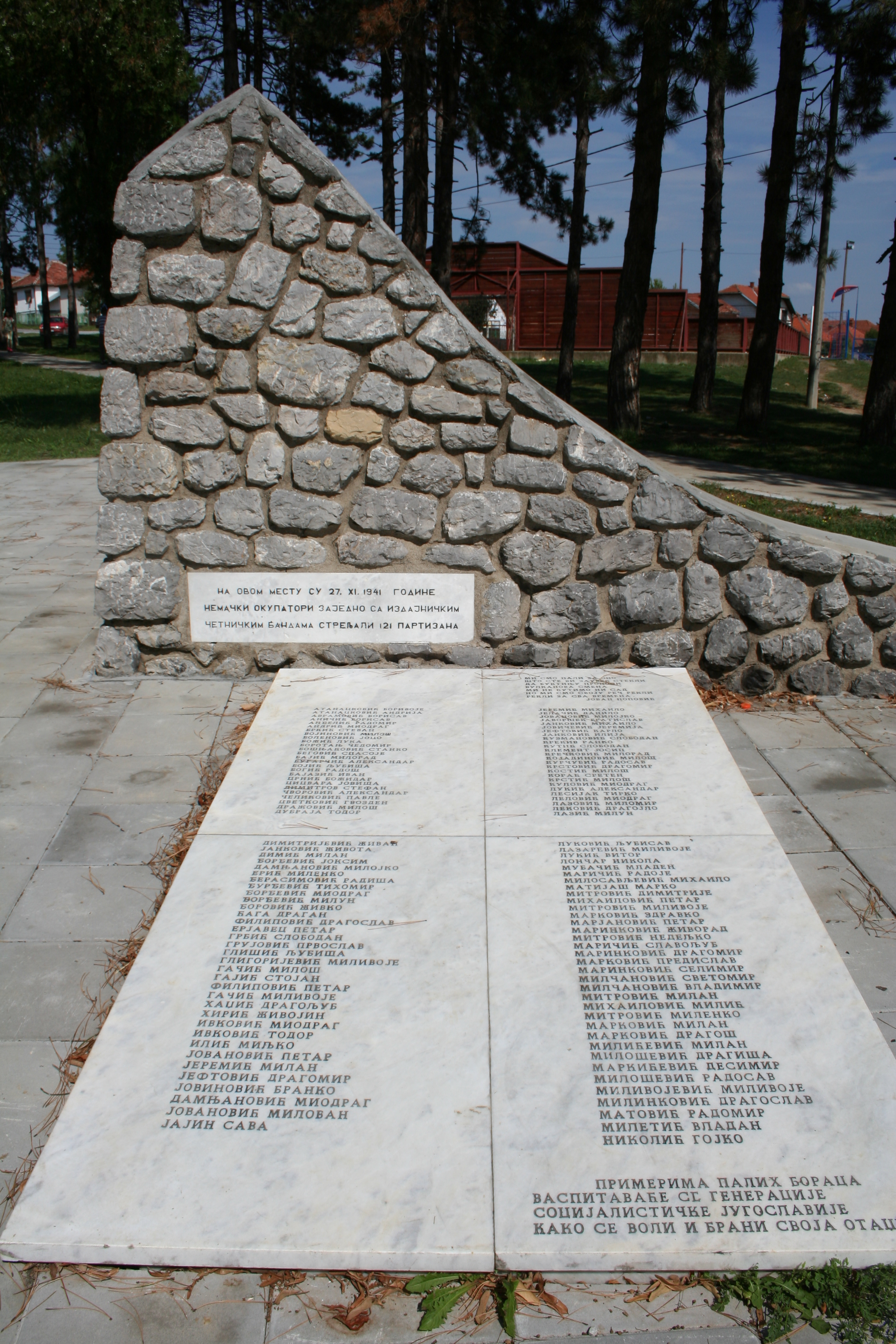
30. Pyramidal monument at a side entrance dedicated to the 121 executed patriots and the sarcophagus with names of victims in front

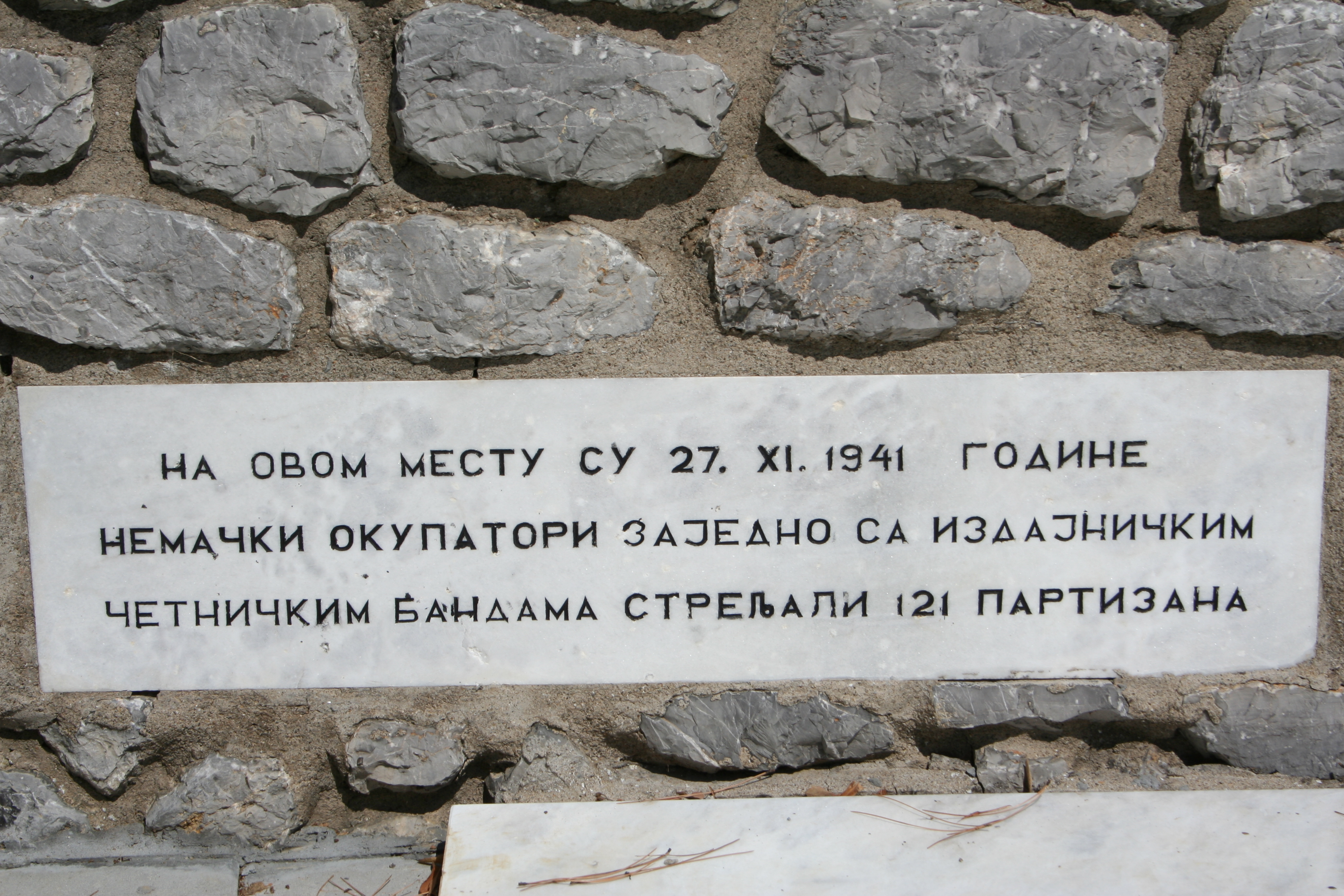
31. Inscription on the monument

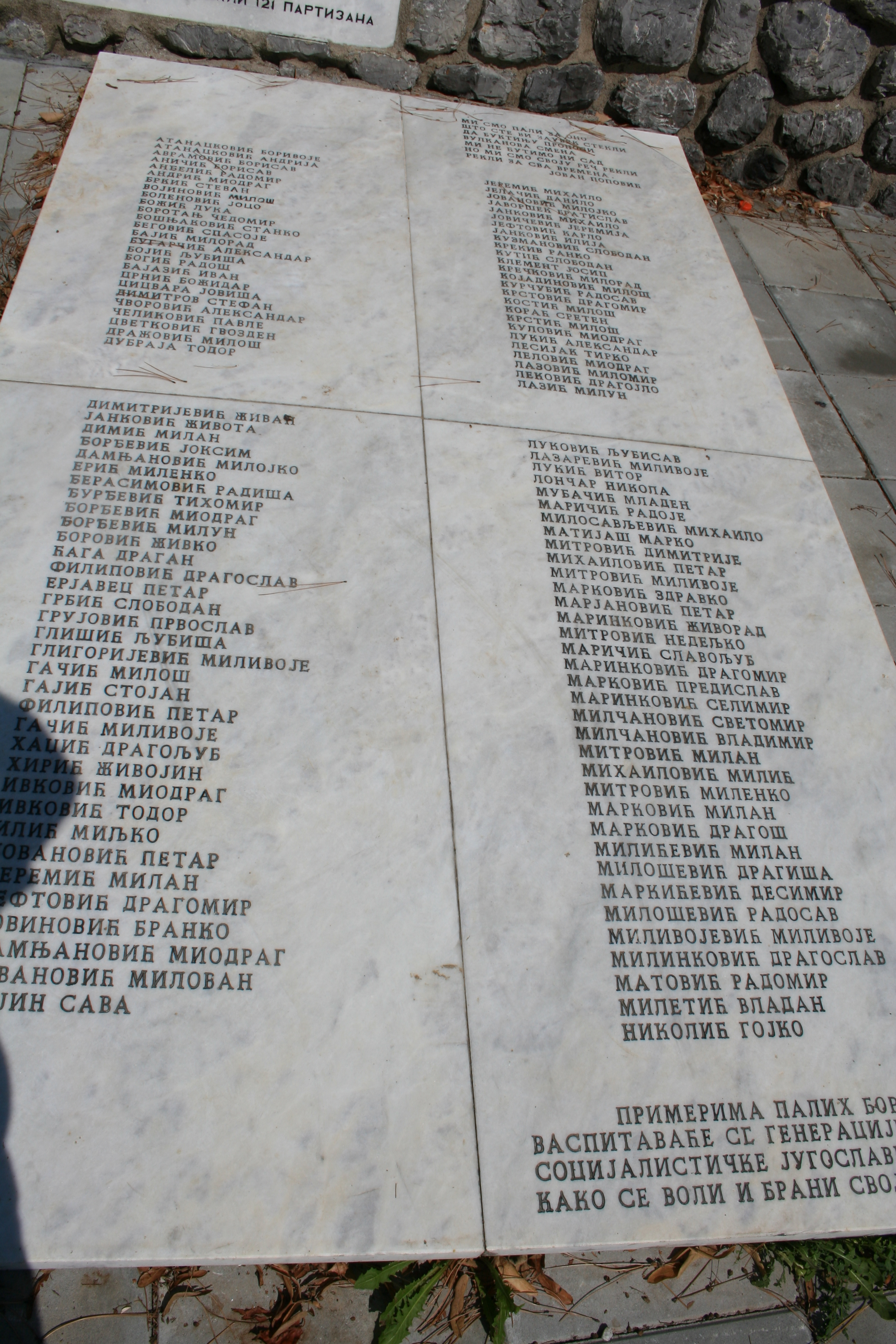
32. Sarcophagus with verses by poet Jovan Popović in the upper right corner of the plaque

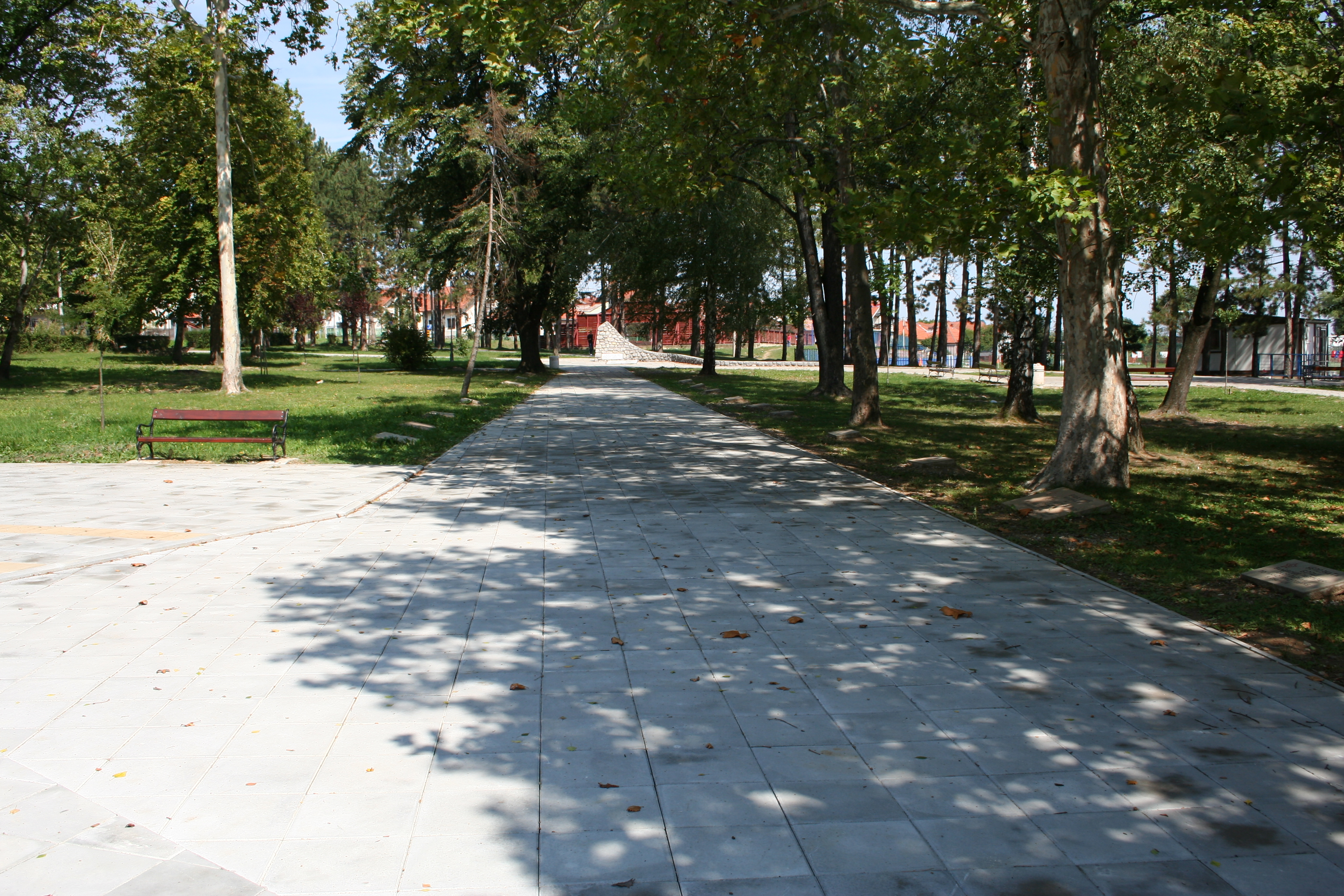
33.

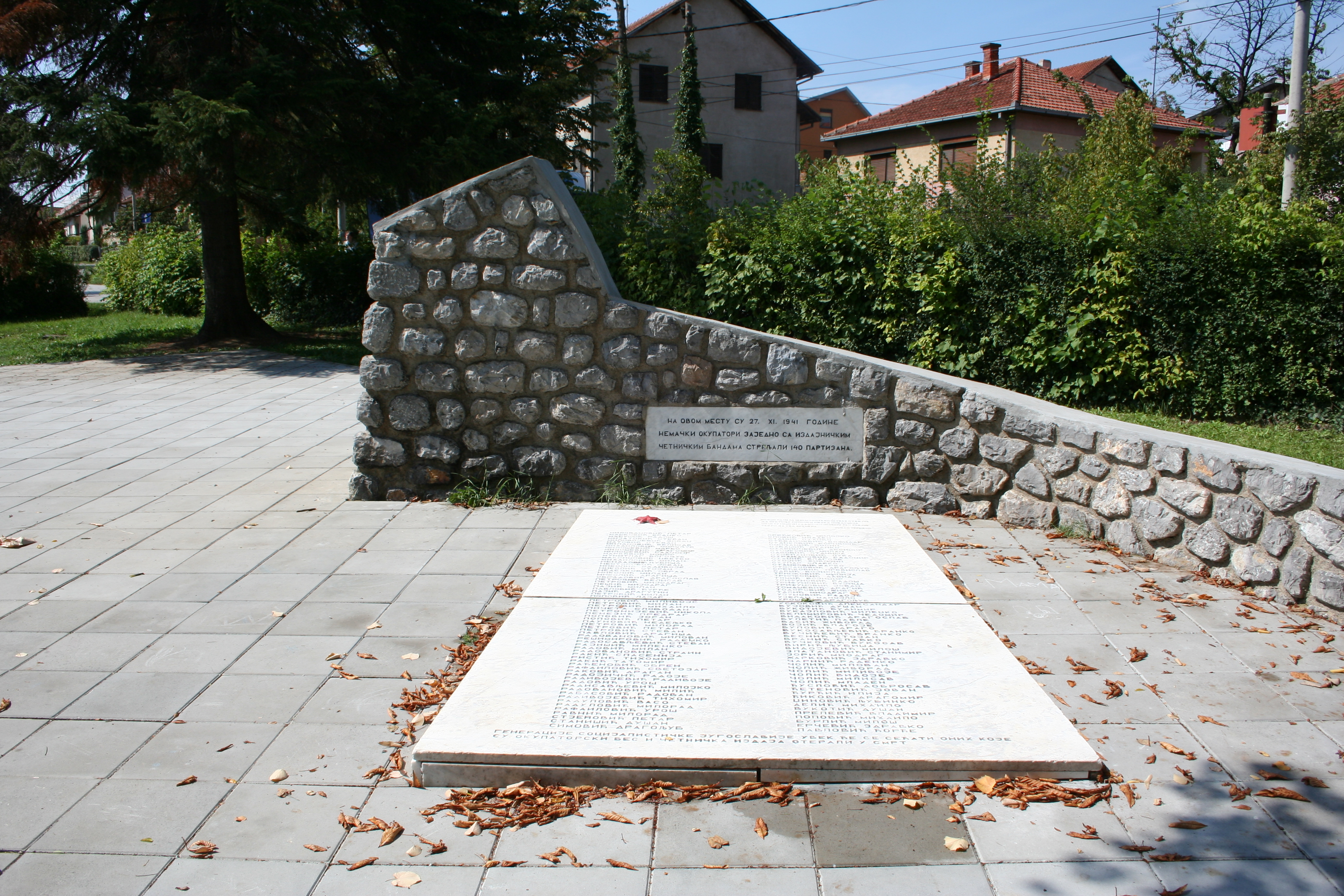
34. Pyramidal monument at the other side entrance

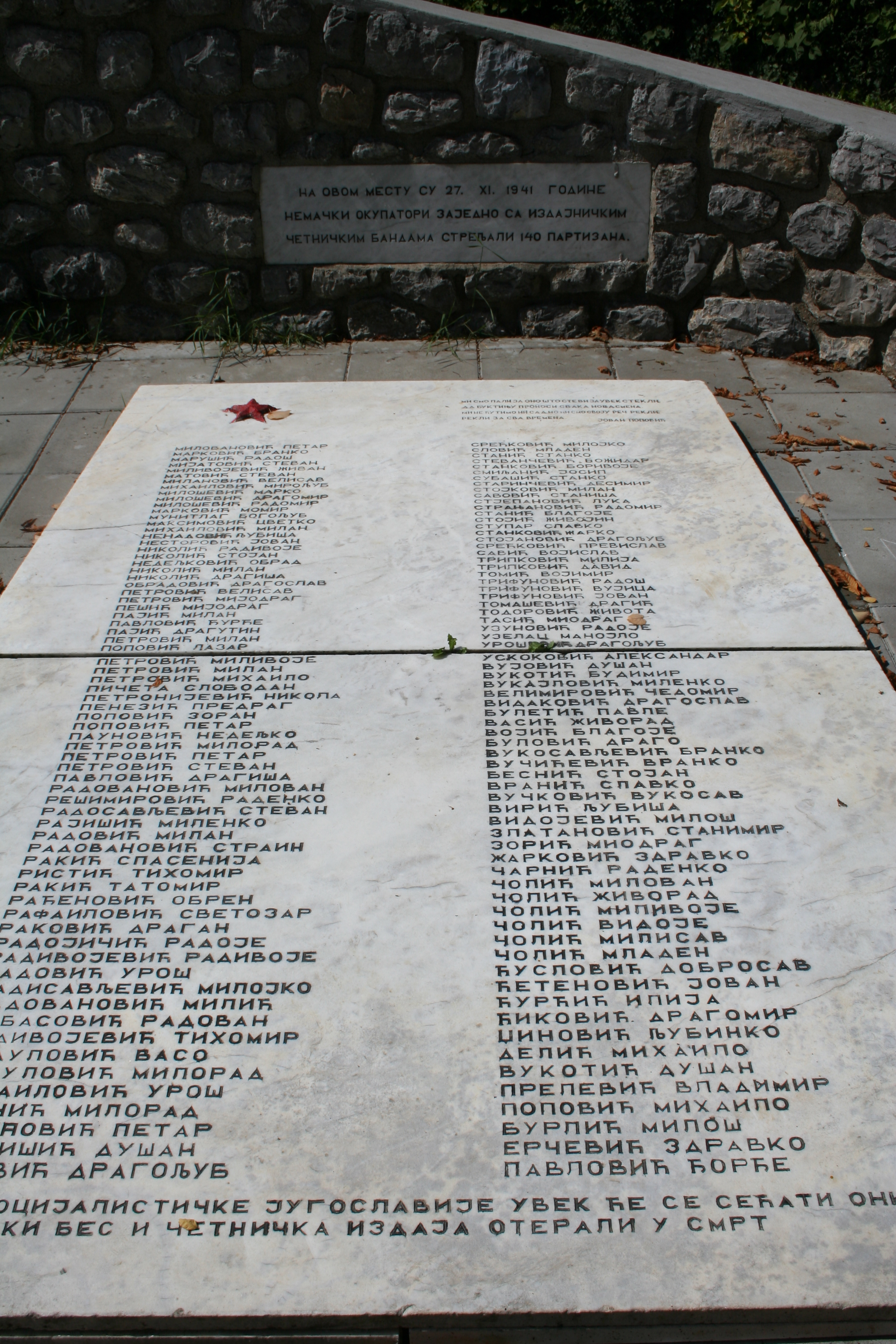
35.

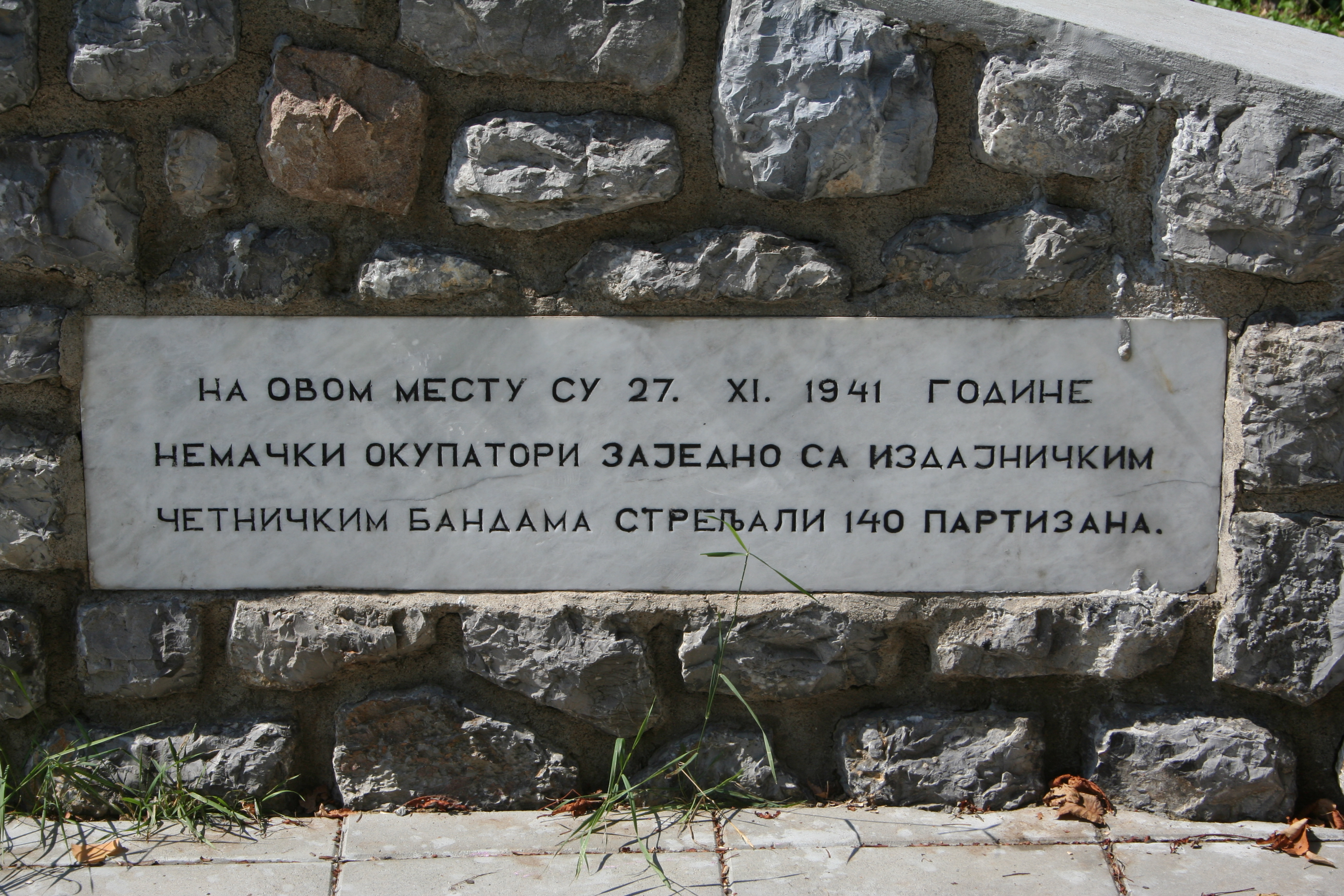
36. Inscription on this monument dedicated to 140 executed patriots

==== Monument at the main entrance ====
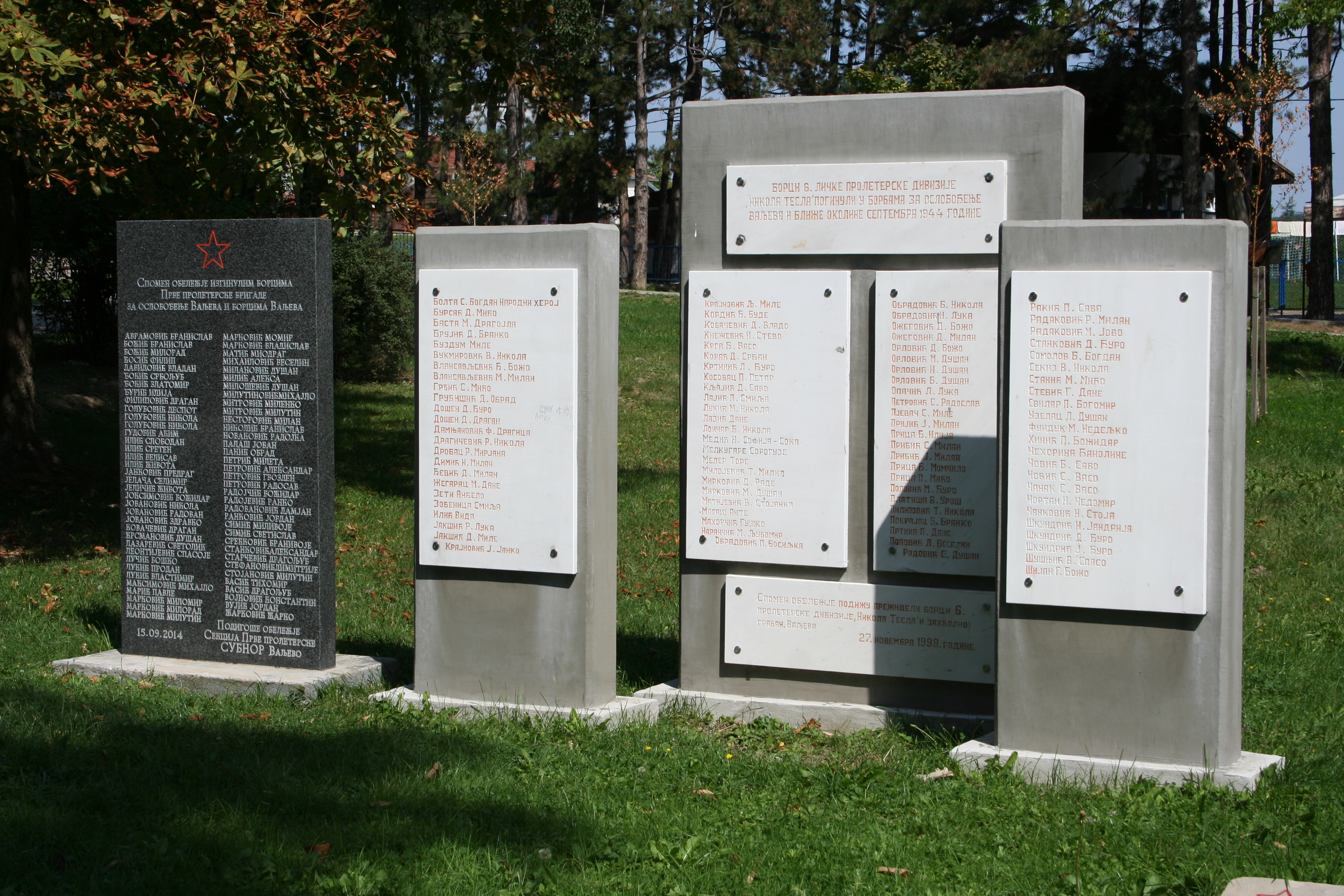
37. Monument at the main entrance with recently installed memorial plaques

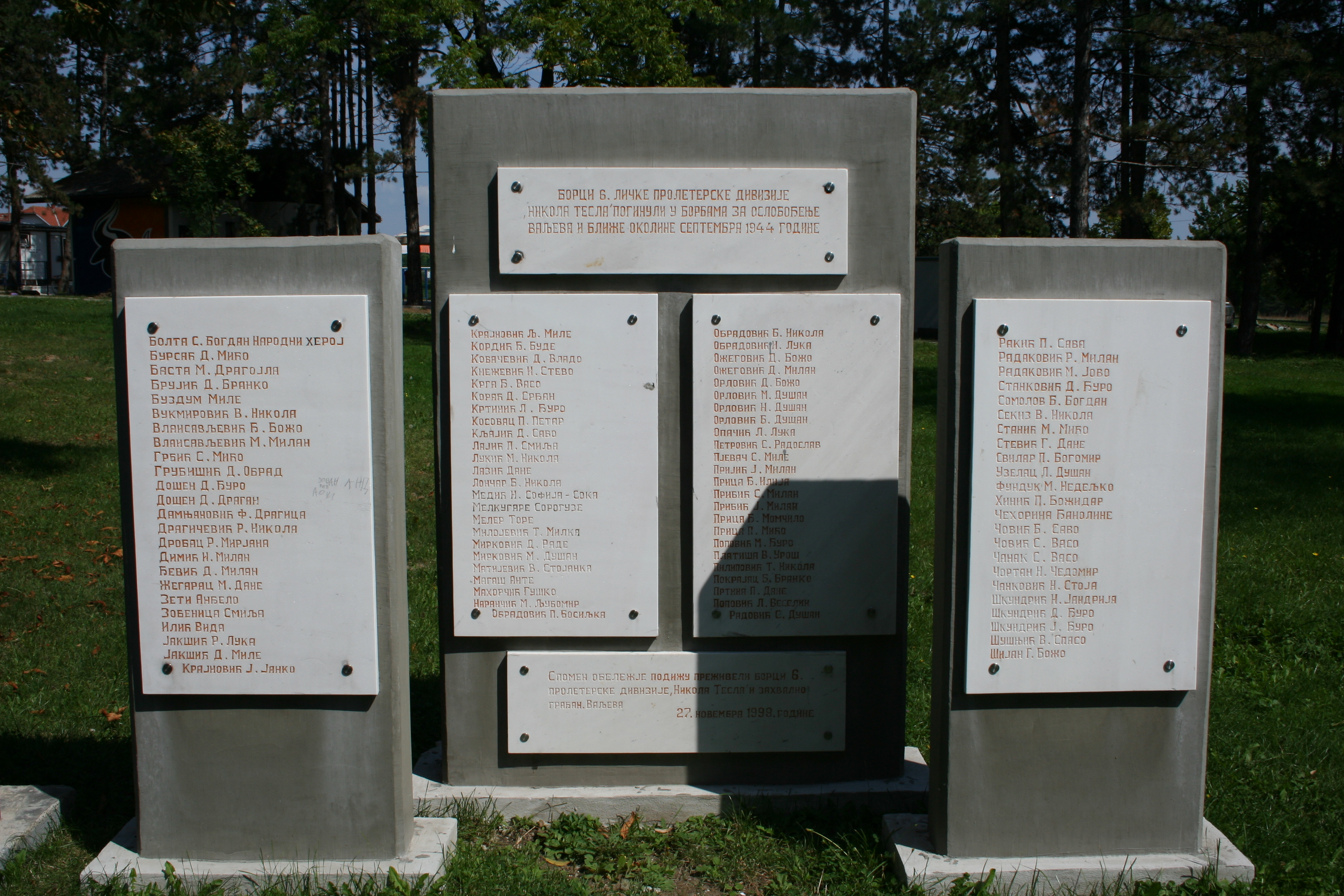
38.

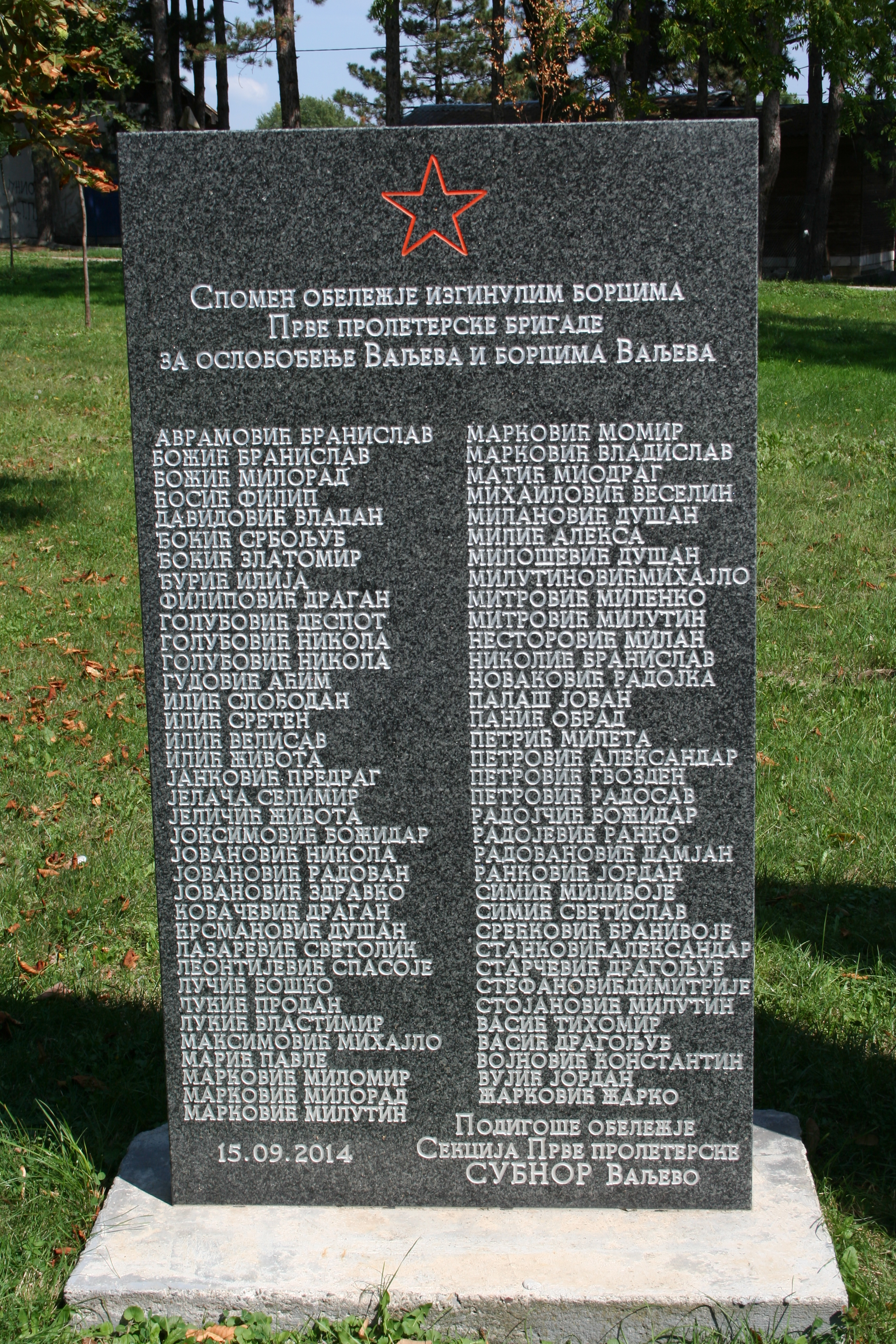
39.

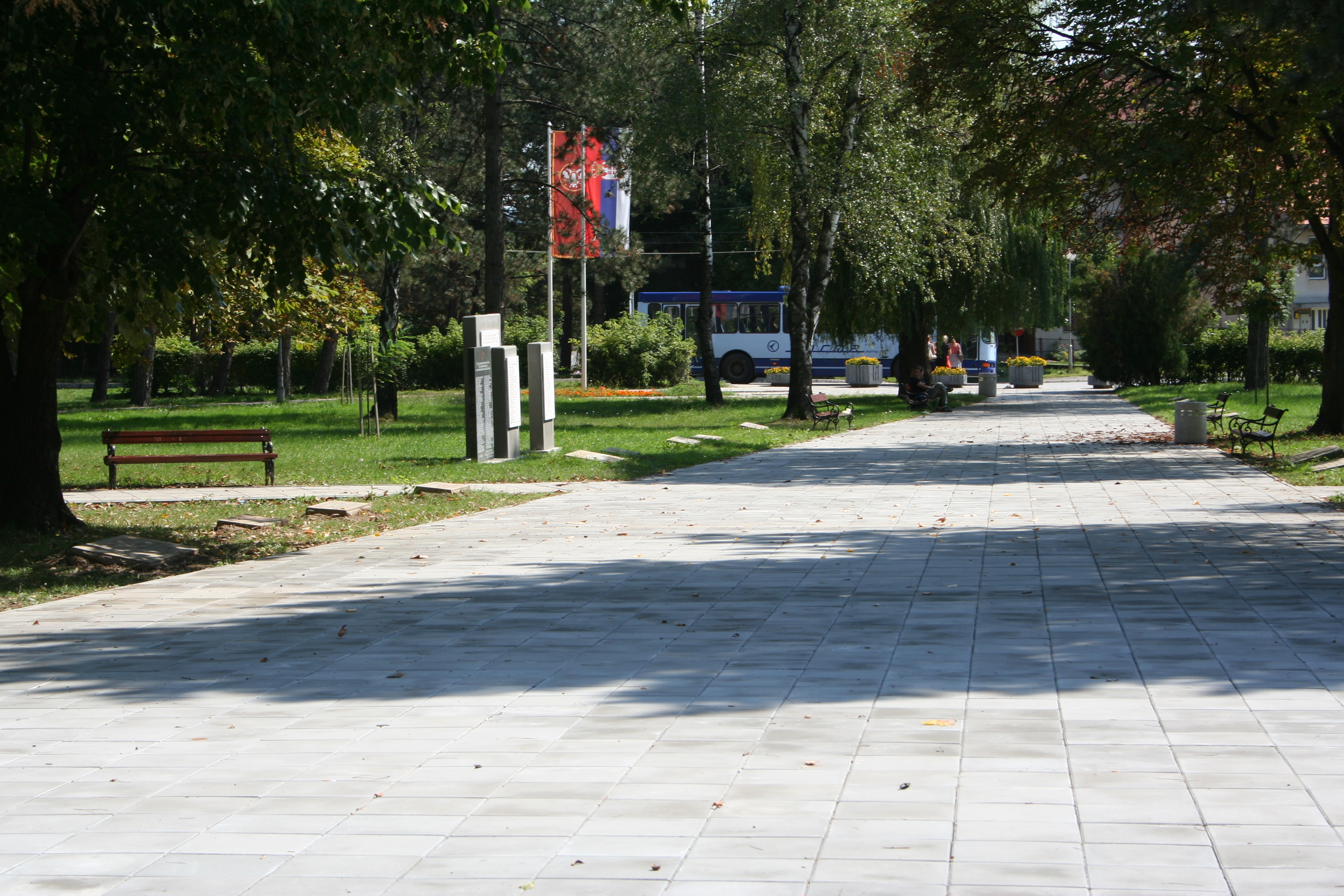
40.

== See also ==
- List of cultural monuments in Kolubara District

== Bibliography ==
- Vlaisavljević, Ugo (2012). Avetinjska stvarnost narativne politike. Sarajevo: Rabic. ISBN 978-9958-33-055-1.
- Group of authors (2006). Spomeničko nasleđe Kolubarskog i Mačvanskog okruga. Valjevo: Institute for the Protection of Cultural Monuments Valjevo. ISBN 978-86-904745-2-3.
- Krstić, Željko Lj. (2018). "Valjevo u potrazi za identitetom". Svitac: časopis za sociološke i psihološke teme. VI (37): 3–18.
- Madić, Milča (2005). "Valjevska varoška (gradska) groblja" (PDF). Glasnik Istorijskog arhiva u Valjevu (39). Valjevo: Istorijski arhiv Valjevo: 5–26.
- Manojlović Pintar, Olga (2014). Arheologija sećanja, spomenici i identiteti u Srbiji 1918–1989. Beograd: Udruženje za društvenu istoriju, Čigoja štampa.
- Milosavljević, Branislav; Ninković, Lazar; Radojčić, Milorad (1995). Spomenica palim borcima i žrtvama fašističkog terora opštine Valjevo: 1941–1945. Valjevo: Istorijski arhiv Valjevo; Opštinski odbor SUBNOR-a Valjevo.
- Narodni heroji Jugoslavije (PDF). Beograd: Mladost. 1975. Archived from the original (PDF) on 15 July 2018.
- Obrenović, Violeta N. (2013). Srpska memorijalna arhitektura 1918–1955 (doctoral dissertation). Belgrade: Faculty of Philosophy, University of Belgrade.
- Poznanović, Rade; Radić, Milun; Radojčić, Milorad (1987). Tragom izdaje: svedočenja o izdaji četnika i streljanju na Krušiku, u Valjevu 1941. Titovo Užice: Opštinski odbori SUBNOR: Bajina Bašta, Valjevo, Gornji Milanovac, Kosjerić, Lajkovac, Ljig, Mionica, Požega, Titovo Užice i Čačak.
- Popović, Razumenka Zuma (1981). Spomenici Narodnooslobodilačke borbe i revolucije SR Srbije 1941–1945. Beograd: Eksport pres.
- Radojčić, Milorad (1987). "Partizansko spomen-groblje na Krušiku u Valjevu" (PDF). In: Tragom izdaje: svedočenja o izdaji četnika i streljanju na Krušiku, u Valjevu 1941. (authors: Rade Poznanović, Milun Radić & Milorad Radojčić). Titovo Užice: Opštinski odbori SUBNOR: Bajina Bašta, Valjevo, Gornji Milanovac, Kosjerić, Lajkovac, Ljig, Mionica, Požega, Titovo Užice i Čačak.
- Sokolović, Miodrag (1974). "Prilog evidenciji spomenika posvećenim ustanku Srbije 1941. godine" (PDF). Saopštenja (X). Beograd: Republički zavod za zaštitu spomenika kulture SR Srbije: 245–250.
- Tito u valjevskom i podrinskom kraju. Šabac; Valjevo; Loznica: Radio novinsko-izdavačka radna organizacija Glas Podrinja; Novinska i radio ustanova Napred; Radio Podrinje. 1981.
