= List of People's Heroes of Yugoslavia monuments in Serbia =

There were 1,322 individuals who were decorated by the Order of the People's hero of Yugoslavia between 1942 and 1973. Many busts and memorials were built in honor of each People's hero. Each of them usually had a bust in his birthplace or at the place of his death. Most of these monuments are built in figurative style.

== Monument list ==
Image	Name	Location	Notes
	Stjepan Abrlić memorial stone	Lisović	Part of the Monument to fallen partisans in Lisović
	Bust of Božidar Adžija	Niš	
	Vlada Aksentijević memorial plaque	Grabovac (Obrenovac)	On the building where Vlada Aksentijević attended school.
	Vlada Aksentijević memorial plaque	Obrenovac	On the place where Vlada Aksentijević was executed together with Buda Davidović
	Cana Babović memorial	Lazarevac	Located inside the House of Culture in Lazarevac.
	Bust of Slobodan Bajić Paja	Novi Sad	Located in front of the "Slobodan Bajić" students' dormitory.
	Bust of Mustafa Bakija	Đakovica	
	Busts of Rajka and Zdenka Baković	Niš	Only Rajka Baković was proclaimed People's Hero of Yugoslavia.
	Bust of Milan Blagojević	Natalinci	
	Bust of Vera Blagojević	Šabac	In the backyard of the library building
	Gravestoneof Bogdan Bolta	Valjevo	Within the Krušik Memorial Cemetery.
	Gravestone and bust of Milorad Bondžulić	Glumač	
	Bust of Dragoljub Božović Žuća	Kragujevac	In the backyard of The "Vukašin Marković" Primary and Secondary School in Kragujevac.
	Monument of Josip Broz Tito	Belgrade	Designed by Antun Augustinčić. There are two castings of the same Augustinčić statue of Tito within the complex of the Museum of Yugoslav History.
	Bust of Josip Broz Tito	Padina	
	Bust of Josip Broz Tito	Robaje	In front of the Robaje memorial house. Sculptor Antun Avgustinčić.
	Monument of Josip Broz Tito	Užice	Sculptured by Frano Kršinić. Moved from its original location on the Partisans Square in 1991. Now located behind the museum.
	Bust of Viktor Bubanj	New Belgrade	
	Bust of Boško Buha	Jabuka	Located within the Memorial Complex "Boško Buha"
	Boško Buha memorial stone	Jabuka	On the place where Boško Buha was killed. Located within the Memorial Complex "Boško Buha".
	Bust of Vladimir Bukilić	Medveđa	
	Gravestone of Miroslav Bukumirović	Belgrade	Located within the Alley of the Executed Patriots in the Belgrade New Cemetery
	Bust of Miroslav Bukumirović	Šetonje	
	Bust of Marija Bursać	Belgrade	In front of the "Marija Bursać" Elementary School
	Bust of Miodrag Čajetinac Čajka	Vrnjačka Banja	
	Monument to Zdravko Čelar	Čelarevo	Sculptor: Aleksandar Zarin
	Bust of Jelena Ćetković	Belgrade	In front of the "Jelena Ćetković" Elementary School
	Bust of Radivoj Ćirpanov	Čurug	
	Monument of Janko Čmelik	Stara Pazova	Designed by Stevan Bodnarov.
	Bust of Janko Čmelik	Stara Pazova	
	Bust of Stevan Čolović	Arilje	
	Bust of Dušan Ćubić	Banatski Despotovac	
	Milorad Dimanić memorial plaque	Gramada (mountain)	On the place where Dimanić was killed.
	Bust of Milorad Dimanić	Vlasotince	
	Bust of Nada Dimić	Zemun	Located within the Zemun Gymnasium
	Bust of Božidar Dimitrijević Kozica	Požarevac	
	Božidar Dimitrijević Kozica memorial plaque	Belgrade	Within the building of the Technical faculties
	Bust of Đura Dimitrijević	Kragujevac	Within the Zastava factory complex
	Đuka Dinić memorial plaque	Belgrade	In the Đuke Dinić street
	Gravestone of Đuka Dinić	Belgrade	Located within the Alley of the Executed Patriots in the Belgrade New Cemetery
	Bust of Đuka Dinić	Donje Konjuvce	
	Bust of Đuka Dinić	Niš	
	Memorial to Dragoslav Đorđević Goša and Sveta Đorđević	Baničina	Only Dragoslav Đorđević was proclaimed People's hero.
	Bust of Dragoslav Đorđević Goša	Belgrade	Bust is located at his grave on Novo groblje.
	Bust of Vladimir Đorđević	Leskovac	Sculptor Dušan Nikolić.
	Memorial Huts "Partisan Camp" with the Monument to Stevan Đorđević Novak and Borivoj Colić Joca	Donja Bela Reka	Only Stevan Đorđević Novak was proclaimed People's Hero.
	Bust of Svetozar Dragović - Toza	Kragujevac	
	Monument of Petar Drapšin	Turija	In front of the elementary school.
	Bust of Dragomir Dražević	Gornji Milanovac	Located within the Peace Hill memorial park.
	Bust of Gojko Drulović	Radoinja	In front of the Gojko Drulović Elementary School
	Dragojlo Dudić monument	Valjevo	Sculptor Vida Jocić
	Gravestone of Dragojlo Dudić	Valjevo	Within the Krušik Memorial Cemetery.
	Bust of Miloš Dudić	Valjevo	Sculptor Vida Jocić
	Gravestone of Miloš Dudić	Valjevo	Within the Krušik Memorial Cemetery.
	Veljko Dugošević monument	Kučevo	In front of the Centar za kulturu "Dragan Kecman"
	Bust of Veljko Dugošević	Ruma	Sculptor Vanja Radauš
	Bust of Stevan Dukić	Belgrade	In front of the "Stevan Dukić" Elementary school
	Bust of Pane Đukić Limar	Niš	In front of the Vožd Karađorđe Elementary School
	Bust of Radomir Đurakić	Čačak	
	Grave of Radomir Đurakić	Ljubić (Čačak)	Part of the Memorial complex and monument on Ljubić.
	Bust of Živan Đurđević	Debelo Brdo	Sculptor Vida Jocić. The bust is located on the place where Đurđević was tortured and killed by the Četniks. The original plaque below the bust, that contained the text about Đurđević's death, was replaced in the 2020s. The new plaque only contains his name and years of birth and death.
	Bust of Živan Đurđević	Valjevo	Sculptor Vida Jocić
	Cenotaph of Živan Đurđević	Valjevo	Within the Krušik Memorial Cemetery.
	Bust of Vasilije Đurović Žarki	Prokuplje	
	Hajdar Dushi memorial plaque	Đakovica	On the house where Hajdar Dushi was born.
	Bust of Sava Eraković Strahinja	Prokuplje	
	Bust of Stjepan Filipović	Belgrade	In the Stjepana Filipovića street.
	Bust of Stjepan Filipović	Valjevo	Sculptor Marijan Kocković
	Monument of Stjepan Filipović	Valjevo	Part of the Monument to the Fighters of the Revolution. Designed by Vojin Bakić, built in 1961.
	Cenotaph of Stjepan Filipović	Valjevo	Within the Krušik Memorial Cemetery.
	Bust of Ljubivoje Gajić	Sopot, Belgrade	Sculptor Momčilo Krković.
	Bust of Radovan Grković	Gornji Milanovac	Located within the Peace Hill memorial park.
	Gravestone of Mahmut Ibrahimpašić	Belgrade	Within the Cemetery of Belgrade Liberators
	Bust of Obren Janjušević Artem	Banatsko Karađorđevo	
	Bust of Ravijojla Janković	Belgrade	On the building of the Military Medical Center "Slavija"
	Bust of Dušan Ječmenić	Guča	
	Monument to Dušan Jerković	Bajina Bašta	
	Busts of Dušan and Nebojša Jerković	Belgrade	Only Dušan Jerković was proclaimed People's Hero
	Predrag "Dragan" Jevtić memorial plaque	Gornji Milanovac	Located on Jevtić's birthhouse.
	Bust of Đoko Jovanić	Apatin	
	Isa Jovanović memorial plaque	Izbište	
	Bust of Rade Jovanović	Parcani (Sopot)	
	Bust of Rade Jovanović	Sopot, Belgrade	Sculptor Momčilo Krković.
	Bust of Savo Jovanović Sirogojno	Jabuka	Located within the Memorial Complex "Boško Buha"
	Bust of Savo Jovanović Sirogojno	Sirogojno	In front of the "Savo Jovanović Sirogojno" Elementary School
	Bust of Stevica Jovanović	Pančevo	
	Bust of Zdravko Jovanović	Valjevska Kamenica	Sculptor Vida Jocić
	Cenotaph of Zdravko Jovanović	Valjevo	Within the Krušik Memorial Cemetery.
	Bust of Žikica Jovanović Španac	Bela Crkva (Krupanj)	Within the Bela Crkva Memorial Complex. Sculptor Stevan Bodnarov.
	Bust of Žikica Jovanović Španac	Belgrade	In front of the former "Žikica Jovanović Španac" Elementary School (Now "Nadežda Petrović" Elementary School)
	Monument of Žikica Jovanović Španac	Radovci	Dedicated to Žikica Jovanović Španac, leader of the 1941 antifascist uprising in Bela Crkva.
	Bust of Žikica Jovanović Španac	Valjevo	Sculptor Vida Jocić
	Gravestone of Žikica Jovanović Španac	Valjevo	Within the Krušik Memorial Cemetery.
	Ratko Jović memorial plaque	Aleksinac	Located on the Aleksinac railway station, where Jović had previously worked.
	Bust of Ratko Jović	Niš	At the Kralj Aleksandar Ujedinitelj Square.
	Slobodan Jović memorial plaque	Kučevo	Located on a house where Jović was born. Address: Svetog Save No. 136
	Bust of Desimir Jovović	Gornji Milanovac	Located within the Peace Hill memorial park.
	Bust of Bogdan Kapelan	Guča	
	Boris Kidrič monument	Belgrade	Sculptor Nikola Koka Janković. The monument was originally located near the Government Building, but in the 1990s, it was moved to its current location in the park of the Museum of Contemporary Art.
	Bust of Filip Kljajić	Niš	
	Filip Kljajić memorial plaque	Niš	
	Bust of Rade Končar	Apatin	
	Bust of Blagoje Kostić Crni	Leskovac	Sculptor Dušan Nikolić
	Sava Kovačević memorial plaque	Belgrade	Located on the street previously named "Save Kovačevića Street" (now "Mileševska Street")
	Bust of Sava Kovačević	Zrenjanin	In front of the Sava Kovačević local council building.
	Bust of Sava Kovačević	Savino Selo	
	Sava Kovačević monument	Vrbas	Within the Agricultural Company "Sava Kovačević"
	Monument of Branko Krsmanović	Paraćin	Sculptor Oto Logo.
	Bust of Marko Kulić	Pančevo	
	Bust of Milinko Kušić	Ivanjica	
	Bust of Trivo Latinović Garonja	Čestereg	
	Bust of Dimitrije Lazarov Raša	Čerević	
	Grave of Janko Lisjak	Belgrade	Located within the Alley of the Executed Patriots in the Belgrade New Cemetery
	Bust of Stojan Ljubić	Brestovac (Bojnik)	
	Bust of Stojan Ljubić	Leskovac	
	Relief portrait of Veljko Lukić Kurjak	Lukićevo	Part of the World War II memorial in the center of the village.
	Bust of Milutin Luković	Gornji Milanovac	Located within the Peace Hill memorial park.
	Bust of Zaga Malivuk	Krnjača	In front of the "Zaga Malivuk" Elementary School
	Bust of Milivoje Manić Albanta	Pirot	
	Živan Maričić memorial plaque	Žiča (Kraljevo)	On the Živan Maričić's birthhouse. The house has since been demolished.
	Bust of Aleksa Markišić	Sokobanja	
	Aleksa Markišić memorial plaque	Sokobanja	Located on the house where Markišić lived.
	Branislav Marković memorial stone	Ljig	Part of the Monument to the victims of fascism.
	Bust of Toza Marković	Kikinda	In front of the main entrance to the "Toza Marković" factory
	Bust of Toza Marković	Stajićevo	
	Toza Marković memorial plaque	Novi Sad	Located on the Archibald Reiss military barracks where Toza Marković was killed
	Toza Marković memorial plaque	Vrbas, Serbia	The Partisan base "Centar" was located at Milivoja Čobanskog Street No. 126 in Vrbas.
	Bust of Veselin Masleša	Belgrade	In front of the "Veselin Masleša" Elementary school
	Bust of Anka Matić Grozda	Inđija	
	Bust of Tihomir Matijević	Gornji Milanovac	Located within the Peace Hill memorial park.
	Bust of Mićo Matović	Ivanjica	
	Milan Mijalković monument	Vinorača	
	Bust of Bora Mikin	Melenci	
	Busts of Sinadin Milenović and Aleksandar Sinadinović	Mlačište	Only Sinadin Milenović was proclaimed People's hero.
	Bust of Miloje Milojević	Belgrade	Bust is located at his grave on Novo groblje.
	Bust of Branko Milošević Metalac	Pranjani	
	Bust of Miodrag Milovanović Lune	Ponikovica	
	Monument to Živan Milovanović Ćata	Sremska Rača	
	Ivan Milutinović memorial plaque	Belgrade	Located in the Gavrila Principa Street
	Ivan Milutinović memorial plaque	Belgrade	Located in the former "Ivana Milutinovića" Street (now "Kneginje Zorke Street")
	Bust of Vera Miščević	Belegiš	
	Bust of Jovan Mitić Đorđe	Bela Palanka	Within the "Vrelo Park of Heroes"
	Bust of Mika Mitrović	Bogatić	In front of the "Milka Mitrović" Elementary School.
	Mika Mitrović memorial	Bogatić	In front of the municipal building.
	Bust of Mika Mitrović	Šabac	In the backyard of the Medical School
	Ratko Mitrović memorial plaque	Čačak	Located on the house where Mitrović lived.
	Bust of Ratko Mitrović	Jezdina	
	Bust of Vukica Mitrović	Apatin	
	Bust of Sreten Mladenović Mika	Belgrade	In front of the kindergarten "Sreten Mladenović", Ulica Vukasovićeva 1a, Kanarevo brdo
	Bust of Sreten Mladenović Mika	Niš	
	Bust of Ivan Muker	Smederevska Palanka	In front of the Elementary School "Hero Ivan Muker"
	Slavko Munćan memorial plaque	Kruščica, Bela Crkva	Located on the house where Munćan was born.
	Bust of Slavko Munćan	Vršac	
	Bust of Ljubomir Nešić	Zaječar	
	Bust of Đorđe Nikšić Johan	Bešenovo	
	Bust of Miodrag Novaković Džudža	Ćuprija	
	Bust of Branislav Obradović Džambo	Guča	
	Bust of Vlada Obradović Kameni	Ašanja	
	Bust of Ljubica Odadžić	Kumane, Novi Bečej	
	Statue of Mileta Okiljević	Sutjeska	
	Bust of Mileta Okiljević	Sutjeska	
	Bust of Marko Orešković	Apatin	
	Bust of Marko Orešković	Belgrade	
	Marko Orešković memorial plaque	Belgrade	Located in the Marka Oreškovića Street
	Bust of David Pajić	Belgrade	
	Bust of Boško Palkovljević Pinki	Manđelos	
	Bust of Boško Palkovljević Pinki	Novi Sad	
	Boško Palkovljević Pinki memorial plaque	Novi Sad	
	Boško Palkovljević Pinki memorial plaque	Stejanovci	
	Boško Palkovljević Pinki memorial stone	near Mala Remeta	One the place where Palkovljević was killed
	Bust of Boško Palkovljević Pinki	Stara Pazova	
	Pavle Pap memorial plaque	Perlez	Located on the birthhouse of Pavle Pap.
	Bust of Nenad Parenta	Belgrade	Located in the Vojvode Stepe street. Sculptor Milan Besarabić
	Grave of Nenad Parenta	Belgrade	Located within the Alley of the Executed Patriots in the Belgrade New Cemetery
	Bust of Stanko Paunović	Beočin	
	Bust of Stanko Paunović	Niš	
	Busts of Drinka and Darinka Pavlović	Belanovica	Only Drinka Pavlović was proclaimed People's Hero
	Bust of Drinka Pavlović	Belgrade	In the backyard of the Drinka Pavlović Elementary School
	Drinka Pavlović Monument	Kuršumlija	In the backyard of the "Drinka Pavlović" Elementary School
	Bust of Milica Pavlović Dara	Leskovac	
	Bust of Milica Pavlović Dara	Valjevo	Sculptor Vida Jocić
	Cenotaph of Milica Pavlović Dara	Valjevo	Within the Krušik Memorial Cemeteryy.
	Bust of Miloje Pavlović	Kragujevac	
	Ratko Pavlović Ćićko memorial plaque	Berilje	
	Bust of Ratko Pavlović Ćićko	Berilje	
	Bust of Ratko Pavlović Ćićko	Prokuplje	In front of the Gymnasium building.
	Grave of Ratko Pavlović Ćićko	Prokuplje	At the Square of Toplica heroes (Trg topličkih junaka).
	Bust of Ratko Pavlović Ćićko	Ratkovo	
	Bust of Marko Peričin Kamenjar	Crepaja	
	Bust of Marko Peričin Kamenjar	Grgurevci	
	Bust of Olga Petrov	Baranda	
	Olga Petrov monument	Padinska Skela	In the yard of the "Olga Petrov" Elementary school
	Bust of Olga Petrov	Pančevo	
	Tomb of Dušan Petrović Šane	Aranđelovac	
	Monument of Moša Pijade	Belgrade	Designed by Branko Ružić, built in 1969.
	Bust of Moša Pijade	Kikinda	In the backyard of the former "Moša Pijade" Elementary School (since renamed to "Sveti Sava" Elementary School)
	Bust of Sima Pogačarević	Vranje	
	Bust of Svetozar Popović-Milić	Gornji Milanovac	Located within the Peace Hill memorial park.
	Bust of Dragica Pravica	Belgrade	In the back yard of the former "Dragica Pravica" Elementary School (Now "1300 kaplara" Elementary School)
	Bust of Đuro Pucar	Subotica	
	Bust of Momir Pucarević	Akmačići	
	Bust of Nada Purić	Belgrade	
	Grave of Nada Purić	Belgrade	Located within the Alley of the Executed Patriots in the Belgrade New Cemetery
	Nada Purić memorial plaque	Belgrade	On the house where Nada Purić lived, 73 Njegoševa street.
	Bust of Lazo Radaković	Apatin	
	Bust of Mićo Radaković	Apatin	
	Bust of Voja Radić	Donje Konjuvce	
	Bust of Voja Radić	Kragujevac	Within the "Zastava" factory
	Bust of Dobrosav Radosavljević	Šabac	In front of the Post office building
	Bust of Dragoljub Radosavljević Toplica	Prokuplje	
	Bust of Aleksandar Ranković	Belgrade	Bust is located at his grave on Novo groblje.
	Aleksandar Ranković memorial plaque	Belgrade	Located on the building of the old hospital, Džordža Vašingtona street.
	Anđa Ranković memorial plaque	Izbište	On Anđa Ranković's birthhouse.
	Bust of Anđa Ranković	Vršac	
	Bust of Ivo Lola Ribar	Mladenovac	
	Bust of Ivo Lola Ribar	Niš	
	Bust of Ivo Lola Ribar	Novi Kozarci	In front of the Elementary School "Ivo Lola Ribar". Sculptor Duško Pašić.
	Bust of Ivo Lola Ribar	Subotica	In front of the Students' Dormitory "Ivo Lola Ribar"
	Bust of Slavko Rodić	Belgrade	Bust is located at his grave on Novo groblje
	Bust of Slavko Rodić	Krajišnik	
	Bust of Jovan Šerbanović	Laznica	In front of his birthhouse
	Bust of Jovan Šerbanović	Žagubica	
	Bust of Mihalj Servo	Mužlja	In front of the "Servo Mihalj" Elementary School building.
	Mihalj Servo memorial plaque	Zrenjanin	On the house where Servo lived.
	Bust of Đorđe Simeonović	Boljevac	
	Bust of Radmila Šišković	Smederevska Palanka	In front of the Elementary School "Hero Radmila Šišković"
	Bust of Ratko Sofijanić	Ivanjica	
	Bust of Luka Spasojević	Ljig	In the backyard of the "1300 kaplara high school"
	Bust of Luka Spasojević and Joviša Radojević	Ljig	Only Luka Spasojević was proclaimed a People's Hero.
	Stanislav Sremčević memorial plaque	Belgrade	In the Stanislava Sremčevića Street
	Bust of Dragan Srnić	Šabac	In front of the People's University building
	Kosta Stamenković monument	Leskovac	
	Bust of Kosta Stamenković	Leskovac	Sculptor Sreten Stojanović.
	Bust of Trajko Stamenković	Leskovac	
	Monument to the Stamenković brothers (Petar, Trajko and Božidar)	Belgrade	In front of the Cultural Institution "Vlada Divljan". Only Trajko was proclaimed People's Hero.
	Bust of Miodrag Mija Stanimirović	Niš	
	Bust of Petar Stanković Ljuba	Vlasotince	
	Velizar Stanković memorial fountain	Miljakovac	
	Bust of Milorad Mića Stanojlović	Koceljeva	
	Bust of Moma Stanojlović	Kragujevac	In front of the "Moma Stanojlović" Elementary School
	Bust of Božidar Stojanović	Medveđa	
	Bust of Milorad Lazar Stojanović	Svilajnac	
	Bust of Mladen Stojanović	Bačko Dobro Polje	
	Bust of Mladen Stojanović	Čestereg	
	Bust of Mladen Stojanović	Mladenovo	
	Bust of Nikodije Stojanović Tatko	Prokuplje	In front of the "Nikodije Stojanović Tatko" Elementary school
	Đuro Strugar memorial plaque	Belgrade	Located in the former "Đure Strugara Street" (since renamed to "Carigradska Street")
	Gravestone of Đuro Strugar	Belgrade	Located within the Alley of the Executed Patriots in the Belgrade New Cemetery
	Milan Tepić monument	Belgrade	
	Milan Tepić memorial plaque	Belgrade	Located in the Heroja Milana Tepića Street
	Gravestone of Mirko Tomić	Belgrade	Located within the Alley of the Executed Patriots in the Belgrade New Cemetery
	Bust of Mirko Tomić	Kruševac	On the Fontana Square
	Monument to Rada Trnić	Mokrin	Sculptor Aleksandar Zarin
	Birth house of Rada Trnić with commemorativee plaque	Mokrin	Ige Dobrosavljeva street No. 8
	Bust of Miodrag Urošević	Kragujevac	Within the Zastava factory complex
	Bust of Čeda Vasović	Guča	
	Bust of Čeda Vasović	Požarevac	
	Bust of Stanimir Veljković Zele	Leskovac	In the backyard of the Gymnasium. Sculptor Dušan Nikolić.
	Bust of Stanimir Veljković Zele	Leskovac	In the factory "Zele Veljković"
	Bust of Veljko Vlahović	Temerin	
	Bust of Veljko Vlahović	Vrbas	
	Bust of Milosav Vlajić	Parcani (Sopot)	
	Bust of Milosav Vlajić	Sopot	Sculptor Momčilo Krković.
	Boško Vrebalov memorial plaque	Melenci	Located on the birthhouse of Boško Vrebalov
	Bust of Boško Vrebalov	Požarevac	
	Bust of Milica Vučetić	Slatina (Čačak)	
	Bust of Jovan Vučković	Bor	In front of the train station.
	Cenotaph of Sava Vujanović Žuća	Valjevo	Within the Krušik Memorial Cemetery.
	Bust of Bogdan Vujošević	Belgrade	Bust is located at his grave on Novo groblje, Belgrade.
	Bust of Radoje Vujošević Risto	Svrljig	
	Bust of Dušan Vukasović	Nova Pazova	
	Bust of Miloje Zakić	Malo Golovode	In front of the iloje Zakić's family house.
	Bust of Konrad Žilnik Slobodan	Bela Palanka	Within the "Vrelo Park of Heroes"
	Bust of Konrad Žilnik Slobodan	Niš	
	Bust of Ljubomir Živković Španac	Bela Palanka	Within the "Vrelo Park of Heroes"
	Đorđe Zličić memorial plaque	Novi Sad	On the house where Đorđe Zličić was killed (in the Karađorđeva Street)
	Đorđe Zličić memorial plaque	Novi Sad	In the Đorđa Zličića Street
	Gravestone of Đorđe Zličić	Novi Sad	Located within the Memorial Cemetery of NOR fighters
	Miladin Zorić Garača memorial plaque	Šid	Located on the Šid railway station
	Bust of Žarko Zrenjanin	Apatin	
	Bust of Žarko Zrenjanin	Belgrade	Formerly located in front of the "Žarko Zrenjanin" Elementary School (now "Aleksandar I Karađorđević" Elementary School). Moved to inside the school building in 2015.
	Žarko Zrenjanin memorial plaque	Belgrade	On the street previously named "Žarko Zrenjanin street" (now Stevana Šupljikca Street)
	Žarko Zrenjanin memorial plaque	Izbište	Located on the house where Žarko Zrenjanin was born.
	Bust of Žarko Zrenjanin	Kikinda	In front of the "Žarko Zrenjanin" Elementary School
	Bust of Žarko Zrenjanin	Novi Sad	In front of the "Žarko Zrenjanin" Elementary School
	Žarko Zrenjanin memorial plaque	Novi Sad	At the Tax Administration building.
	Žarko Zrenjanin memorial plaque	Pančevo	On the house where a Communist Party meeting was held.
	Žarko Zrenjanin memorial plaque	Pavliš	Located on the house where Žarko Zrenjanin was killed.
	Žarko Zrenjanin memorial plaque	Skorenovac	Located on the building where Žarko Zrenjanin attended school.
	Bust of Žarko Zrenjanin	Vrbas	In the courtyard of the Gymnasium
	Bust of Žarko Zrenjanin	Vršac	
	Monument of Žarko Zrenjanin	Zrenjanin	
	Memorial plaque to the People's Heroes - students of the Belgrade University Faculty of Law	Belgrade	Within the building of the University of Belgrade Faculty of Law
	Memorial plaque to the People's Heroes - students of the Belgrade University Faculty of Pholosophy	Belgrade	Within the building of the University of Belgrade Faculty of Philosophy
	Tomb of the People's Heroes with busts of Moša Pijade, Ivan Milutinović, Ivo Lola Ribar and Đuro Đaković	Belgrade	Located within the Kalemegdan Park. Đuro Đaković was not proclaimed a people's hero.
	The Stone Bouquet monument	Topola	Located in front of the Vineyard House, the monument depicts four carved marble heads that represent four People's heroes: Sofija Ristić, Milan Blagojević "Španac", Milić Radovanović "Mladen" and Darinka Radović. Sculptor Milija Glišić
	Memorial to National Heroes with busts of Ljubiša Miodragović, Dušan Tomašević, Milosav Stiković and Vladimir Perić-Valter	Prijepolje	Sculptors of the busts: Božidar Obradović and Milovan Krstić
	Busts of Stanko Paunović, Miodrag Stanimirović and Dimitrije Pisković	Niš	In front of the High School of Mechanics (Mašinska Škola)
	Busts of Ljubivoje Gajić, Miroslav Jovanović Cerovac and Milivoje Stojković Mića	Grocka	
	Busts of Ivan Stefanovića Srba, Milivoj Stojković Mića and Svetomir Mladenović Sveta	Smederevo	Located in the "Tree Heroes" park
	Busts of Veljko Dugošević, Žarko Zrenjanin and Dušan Vukasović	Sombor	In front of the Pedagogical Faculty. Sculptor Jovan Soldatović.
	Busts of Slavoljub Vuksanović "Jajko", Trajko Jovanović "Josif", Radivoj Uvalić, Radoš Jovanović "Selja", Živa Čiklovan and Ratko Pavlović "Ćićko"	Grgure	Vuksanović and Pavlović were proclaimed People's heroes. Bust of Ratko Pavlović is missing.
	Busts of Dimitrije Lazarov Raša and Stevan Petrović Brile	Beočin	Originally, the monument only contained a bust of Stevan Petrović Brile (photo). In 2017, local authorities modified it by adding five more busts including that of People's hero Dimitrije Lazarov Raša.
	Busts of Vlada Aksentijević and Bora Marković	Obrenovac	In the park
	Busts of Milivoje Manić Albanta and Milorad Petrović	Obrenovac	In the park
	Busts of Božidarka Damnjanović Kika and Milosav Vlajić	Mladenovac	
	Žarko Zrenjanin and Anđа Ranković memorial	Izbište	
	Busts of Marko Orešković and Miladin Zorić Garača	Nakovo	In the Main Street.
	Busts of Vlado Tomanović and Miro Popara	Sečanj	
	Busts of Rajko Mihailović and Milan Munjas	Ub	
	Busts of Lepa Radić and Zlate Malakovski	Jabuka	Located within the Memorial Complex "Boško Buha"
	Busts of Vera Miščević and Mate Blažina	Jabuka	Located within the Memorial Complex "Boško Buha"
	Busts of Vojislav Bogdanović and Boško Vrebalov	Rabrovo (Kučevo)	Sculptor B. Obradović.
	Busts of Ramiz Sadiku and Boro Vukmirović	Pristina	Only the bust of Sadiku remains. Vukmirović's bust has been destroyed.
	Busts of Slobodan Jović and Veljko Dugošević	Kučevo	Žike Popoviča 64
	Monument with reliefs of Boško Palkovljević Pinki and Sava Sogić	Manđelos	
	Gravestone of Branko Đonović and Slobodan Jović	Belgrade	Within the Cemetery of Belgrade Liberators
	Gravestone of Blažo Popivoda and Dušan Milutinović	Belgrade	Within the Cemetery of Belgrade Liberators
	Tomb of People's Heroes	Niš	Resting place of two People's Heroes: Miodrag Mija Stanimirović and Konrad Žilnik Slobodan
	Gravestone of Janko Čmelik and Boško Palkovljević Pinki	Sremska Mitrovica	Located within the Memorial Cemetery in Sremska Mitrovica
	Gravestone of Stanko Paunović and Slobodan Bajić Paja	Sremska Mitrovica	Located within the Memorial Cemetery in Sremska Mitrovica

== See also ==
- People's Heroes of Yugoslavia monuments
  - People's Heroes of Yugoslavia monuments in Bosnia and Herzegovina
  - People's Heroes of Yugoslavia monuments in Croatia
  - List of People's Heroes of Yugoslavia monuments in North Macedonia
- List of Yugoslav World War II monuments and memorials
  - List of World War II monuments and memorials in Serbia
