= Žiča (disambiguation) =

Žiča is a medieval monastery near the city of Kraljevo in Serbia.

Žiča may also refer to:

- Žiča (Kraljevo), a village near the city of Kraljevo in Serbia
- Archbishopric of Žiča, medieval Serbian Orthodox Archbishopric, founded in 1219
- Eparchy of Žiča, modern diocese of the Serbian Orthodox Church
