= Jovan Šerbanović =

Yugoslav Partisan and People's Hero (1919–1944)

- Јован Шербановић
- Born: 1919; Laznica, Žagubica, Kingdom of Serbs, Croats and Slovenes
- Died: 6 January 1944 (aged 24–25); Sige, near Žagubica, German occupied Serbia
- Military career
- Allegiance: Yugoslav Partisans
- Rank: Political commissar, Mlava Company
- Nickname: Šerban
- Unit: Požarevac Partisan Detachment
- Conflicts: World War II in Yugoslavia
- Awards: Order of the People's Hero

Jovan Šerbanović (1919 – 6 January 1944), known by the nom de guerre Šerban, was a Yugoslav communist and Partisan fighter in occupied Serbia. A medical student and member of the Communist Party of Yugoslavia from 1939, he served as political commissar of the Mlava Company of the Požarevac Partisan Detachment and was a leading figure of the resistance movement in eastern Serbia. He was killed in January 1944 and was posthumously proclaimed a People's Hero of Yugoslavia in 1949.

He is the only recipient of the title from the territory of the Žagubica municipality and the Homolje region.

== Early life and education ==
Šerbanović was born in 1919 in the village of Laznica, near Žagubica, in northern Homolje. He completed primary school in his native village and attended the gymnasium in Požarevac.

While in the fifth year of the gymnasium he joined the revolutionary youth movement and became one of its more prominent members at the school. After completing his secondary education he moved to Belgrade and enrolled at the Faculty of Medicine, where he took part in the revolutionary student movement at the university. He joined the Communist Party of Yugoslavia in 1939.

== Second World War ==
=== Požarevac, 1941 ===
Following the April War and the occupation of the Kingdom of Yugoslavia in 1941, Šerbanović was sent by the Party to Požarevac, where in May 1941 he became a member of the District Committee of the Communist Party of Yugoslavia for Požarevac. He worked on organising the uprising in the region and took part in the district party conference held on 8 June.

During this period he organised and participated in several acts of sabotage, the largest of which was the burning of 8.5 wagonloads of wheat intended for German forces at the "Meminac" state estate at Ljubičevo in early August 1941.

=== Požarevac Partisan Detachment ===
In September 1941, by decision of the Party, Šerbanović left Požarevac and joined the Požarevac Partisan Detachment, in which he served as political commissar of the Mlava Company. The detachment operated in the Homolje and Mlava areas, and its actions during this period included fighting against the Chetnik formations of Kosta Pećanac and operations in the area of Despotovac and the Gornjak Monastery.

At the end of 1941 and the beginning of 1942, occupying forces launched a major offensive against the liberated territory in eastern Serbia. In the fighting that followed, in which the detachment sustained heavy losses, Šerbanović worked as a party official and political leader on preserving the unit.

He was wounded in the spring of 1942 but recovered and returned to the detachment. In the autumn of the same year he was wounded a second time and more seriously in fighting with Chetnik forces, and was withdrawn from the unit for medical treatment, remaining in convalescence until February 1943.

=== Death ===
Šerbanović was killed on 6 January 1944 in the village of Sige, near Žagubica. The death was contested during the years by family members claiming that he was ordered to be killed by his own party local representatives from Homolje.

== Recognition ==
By decree of the Presidium of the National Assembly of the Federal People's Republic of Yugoslavia, Šerbanović was posthumously awarded the Order of the People's Hero in 1949.

== Legacy ==
Šerbanović's birthplace in Laznica, a house built in the late 19th or early 20th century, was declared a cultural monument in 1950. Built in the bondruk timber frame technique with split laths and mud infill, and laid out on a plan in the shape of the Cyrillic letter Г, it stands on the Žagubica Bor road and has been converted into a museum with a permanent ethnographic display; a memorial bust of Šerbanović stands in the courtyard.

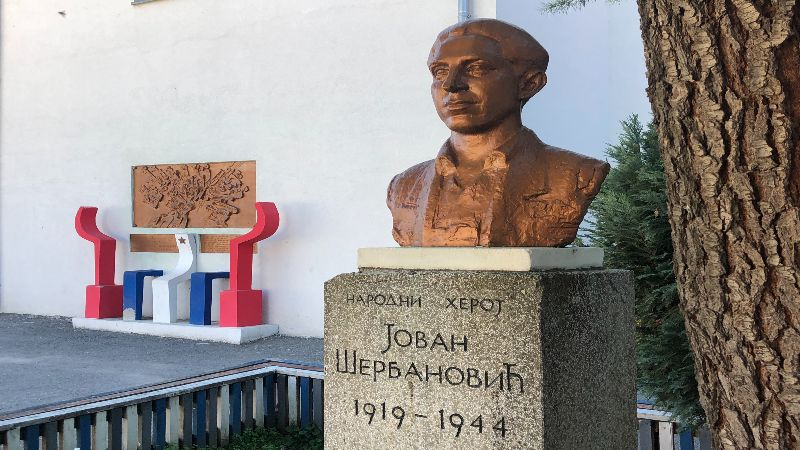
a memorial bust of Šerbanović stands in the courtyard of primary school carrying his name in Laznica

Several primary schools in the Braničevo District are named after him, including those in Laznica, Krepoljin and Ranovac.

In the historical memory of the Homolje region, Šerbanović is paired with the interwar outlaw Ivan Babejić, likewise a native of Laznica, as one of the two figures who define the district's identity.

== See also ==
- Order of the People's Hero
- Yugoslav Partisans
- World War II in Yugoslavia
- Homolje
- Laznica

== Bibliography ==
- Народни хероји Југославије. Belgrade: Партизанска књига / Народна књига; Titograd: Побједа, 1982.
- Народни хероји Југославије. Belgrade: Младост, 1975.dedicated entry at pages 249 to 250 of Narodni heroji Jugoslavije
