= Ivan Babejić =

Vlach hajduk and outlaw from Homolje (died 1934)

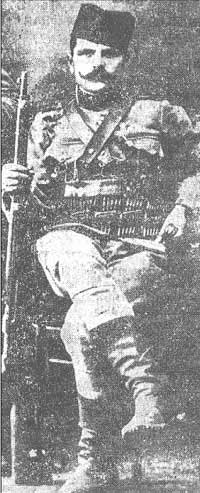
- Ivan Babejić
- Born: c. 1896; Laznica, Kingdom of Serbia
- Died: 5 September 1934; Paljane, Kingdom of Yugoslavia
- Other name: Mountain Tsar
- Occupation: Hajduk
- Years active: 1916–1934
- Spouse: Ana Babejić
- Children: Branko Babejić

Ivan Babejić (born c. 1896; died during the night of 4–5 September 1934) was a Vlach hajduk and outlaw from Homolje, known by the nickname Mountain Tsar (Serbian: Горски цар, Gorski car). He operated in Homolje, Zvižd, the Mlava and Resava regions, and Pomoravlje during the final years of the First World War and the interwar period.

He spent nearly two decades evading gendarmerie pursuits. During his lifetime, his name entered folk songs, stories and legends, although the events of his life are difficult to separate from newspaper sensationalism and later oral tradition.

The interwar press portrayed him as a dangerous bandit and attributed murders, robberies, extortion and an extensive network of helpers to him. By contrast, historian Đorđe Stanković wrote that, during Babejić's 18 years as a hajduk, it "could not be established" that he had committed any crime and that he consequently remained a "mythical hero" in popular memory.

== Early life ==
Babejić was born in Laznica near Žagubica, into a Vlach family. Vojislav S. Marjanović identified his parents as Nikola and Žarka Babejić.

His exact year of birth is uncertain. Marjanović and the Požarevac newspaper Građanin gave 1896, a year also used by the Radio Television of Serbia documentary Trag: Gorski car.

However, Vreme described Babejić in October 1931 as a 42-year-old man, which would indicate an earlier birth year. Because of this discrepancy, an exact year cannot be given with certainty.

He was married to Ana Babejić. On 11 October 1931, Vreme reported that Ana had initiated divorce proceedings before an ecclesiastical court and asked the Ministry of the Interior to certify that her husband was a hajduk.

According to her statement as reported by the newspaper, she married Ivan at the age of 18 after he allegedly threatened to kill her if she refused. She said that he left her several months after the wedding and fled into the forest after the authorities began searching for him in connection with a criminal offence. The ministry issued the requested certificate.

They had a son, Branko. According to the same report, Babejić separated the child from his mother and entrusted him to a man in Laznica. Branko died at the age of four. In 1931, Ana said that she was no longer sure whether Babejić was alive and that some of his relatives had expressed the same doubt.

Following the arrest of Draža Gligorijević in 1940, Vreme reported that news that Babejić had a son caused "a great sensation" in Homolje. The newspaper did not clearly identify the person or provide evidence that Babejić had another child, and the report remains unconfirmed.

== First World War ==
According to the RTS documentary, Babejić was mobilised into the Serbian Army at the beginning of the First World War. Bulgarian forces captured him in 1915, but he escaped and returned to Laznica. After being captured again, he was interned on Devil's Island in the Black Sea. According to the same source, he escaped from there as well and took to the forest in 1916. Local monographs and later oral tradition give differing and often dramatised versions of his captures and escapes, and the course of his imprisonment cannot be reconstructed in full.

Stanković dated the beginning of Babejić's activities as a hajduk to 1916 and stated that he continued them after the establishment of the new Yugoslav state.

Vreme wrote on 11 April 1928 that Babejić had lived in the forest during the Bulgarian occupation and that the Bulgarian authorities had sent soldiers and gendarmes against him. According to the report, he surrendered to the new authorities after the liberation.

According to Vreme, after the war he was sentenced to one year in prison in a case concerning the theft of two pairs of oxen. Babejić denied the charge, but the court convicted him on the basis of witness statements and a certificate issued by the municipality.

While being transported to Niš, he escaped by jumping from the carriage while handcuffed and while the train was travelling at high speed. No trace of him was found after the jump. The episode became one of the best-known parts of his biography and marked the beginning of a new period as an outlaw.

== Life as a hajduk ==
Stanković called Babejić the celebrated "Mountain Tsar" and stated that he operated in Homolje, Zvižd and across the Morava. According to Stanković, Babejić's band numbered between 11 and 15 men. Its members included Petar Strujić from Manastirica near Petrovac na Mlavi, Živojin Mitrović from Sena near Kučevo, and the Barbulović brothers.

On 18 November 1927, Politika published an article entitled "Hajduks with umbrellas", accompanied by a photograph which its caption identified as showing Ivan Babejić, Živojin Mitrović, Lazar Radovanović and Petar Strujić.

Newspaper reports from 1940 stated that Babejić and Draža Gligorijević ranged over a wide area—Homolje, Mlava, Resava and Pomoravlje—and allegedly reached Prahovo, Gradište, Kragujevac and Niš. These details came from reporting occasioned by Gligorijević's arrest and do not constitute a precisely documented itinerary.

The press occasionally claimed that Babejić crossed into Romania or hid there. After his death, Građanin wrote that he sometimes withdrew across the border, although such reports generally rested on tips, official assumptions and rumours.

His prolonged evasion of the authorities depended on a network of helpers who supplied the hajduks with food, shelter and information about the movements of the gendarmerie.

At a 1937 trial concerning the Homolje hajduks, Đorđe Puplić of Bigrenica was named as a man who had earlier hidden Babejić and Draža Gligorijević. Puplić allegedly offered later hajduks a cave in which Babejić had previously hidden. Dubočka Mountain was mentioned at the same trial as an area in which Babejić had hidden.

The catalogue of the Historical Archives of Požarevac records an archival unit containing confidential correspondence about the organisation of manhunts and cases concerning the arrest of Babejić and other hajduks between 1920 and 1940.

=== Reward for capture ===
The state reward for Babejić's capture increased over time. According to Građanin, it was 5,000 dinars on 2 January 1921, increased to 50,000 on 28 March 1927, and was raised to 100,000 dinars by an order of the Ministry of the Interior dated 22 December 1927.

On 31 March 1937, Vreme wrote that the reward of 50,000 dinars had been the highest for most outlaws, "with the exception of Babejić, for whom a reward of 100,000 was offered".

After Babejić's death, Pravda reported on 3 October 1934 that, by a decision dated 27 September, the interior minister had authorised payment of 100,000 dinars to the peasant who had contributed to his killing.

=== False report of death in 1929 ===
On 13 August 1929, Vreme published an article entitled "How the notorious hajduk Babejić was captured and killed", which described in detail his alleged death during a gendarmerie pursuit near Žagubica.

The report soon proved false. On 15 August the Slovenian daily Jutro published an article entitled "Babejić straši dalje" ("Babejić continues to spread fear"), stating that his death had not been confirmed and that the gendarmerie pursuit continued. The newspaper speculated that his associates may have spread the rumour of his death to reduce the pressure of the manhunt.

The episode illustrates the extent to which reports about Babejić relied on unverified tips and how he had already become the subject of sensational stories during his lifetime.

=== Letter to the National Museum ===
On 21 June 1930, Vreme reported that the National Museum in Belgrade had received an unusual letter signed with Ivan Babejić's name. The story appeared on the front page under the headline "Hajduk Babejić demands one million dinars from the National Museum?", with a subheading in which the editors questioned whether it was a bandit's message or a joke.

The letter contained a ten-Austrian heller nickel coin dated 1895, supposedly given to the museum by the sender. At the same time, the museum was instructed to prepare one million dinars by 29 June. The letter bore a Požarevac postmark and was delivered to Dr Josa Petrović of the museum's numismatic department.

The letter's authenticity was never established. The interwar press also reported cases of people using Babejić's name to make threats and demands, so it cannot be stated with certainty that Babejić sent the letter himself.

== Allegations of crimes ==
Interwar newspaper reports attributed murders, robberies, extortion, arson and revenge attacks against witnesses and opponents to Babejić. Immediately after his death, Građanin portrayed him as an outlaw responsible for numerous offences.

Stanković, however, wrote that during Babejić's 18 years as a hajduk it had not been possible to establish that he committed any crime. New statements about earlier crimes emerged after the 1940 arrest of Draža Gligorijević. Ilija Mikuljević of Laznica, who said that he had spent nine years in prison for the murder of Petar Šermanović, claimed that Babejić and Gligorijević were the actual killers and that Babejić had fired the fatal shot. The newspaper presented this as Mikuljević's later statement rather than as a fact previously established in court.

=== Gligorijević's account ===
After his arrest in 1940, Draža Gligorijević made several claims about the years he spent with Babejić. According to his statement as reported by Vreme, when the two men had collected about 10,000 dinars, Babejić would say that they had enough money for the winter and should no longer go out for money.

The claim was later used in portrayals of Babejić as a hajduk with his own rules and limits, but it rests solely on Gligorijević's later testimony. Pravda also reported that stories had circulated that Gligorijević had taken Babejić's rifle and money. Gligorijević partly denied this, claiming that he had taken only several thousand dinars.

== Death ==
Babejić was killed during the night of 4–5 September 1934 in Paljane near Ćuprija. Four days later, Građanin published a detailed report and stated that Babejić was 38 years old.

=== Miša Ilić's version ===
According to the version accepted in the investigation at the time, Babejić and Draža Gligorijević came to the house of Miša Ilić in Paljane. Ilić claimed that he opened fire on them, killing Babejić and wounding Gligorijević, who escaped.

Ilić was identified as the man who had contributed to Babejić's killing and received the state reward of 100,000 dinars.

=== Draža Gligorijević's version ===
The official version was challenged six years later, following the arrest of Draža Gligorijević. Gligorijević stated that he had personally killed Babejić and had agreed with Miša Ilić that Ilić would take the credit and collect the reward.

As a result of the statement, Ilić was arrested and confronted with Gligorijević. Gligorijević claimed that he had killed Babejić in Paljane and rejected rumours that the body had been brought from elsewhere. According to Vreme, residents of Laznica were surprised by the confession because they had regarded Gligorijević and Babejić as good friends.

Pravda stressed that Gligorijević's claims still had to be investigated. Because of the conflicting statements, it cannot be determined with complete certainty who fired the fatal shots.

According to Građanin, Babejić was a very large man, weighing more than 100 kg (220 lb). Four bags were found on him, two of which contained food, while he had only about sixteen dinars in cash.

== Public image and legend ==
Babejić's name became widely known long before his death. In January 1929, in an article about the famous Hungarian outlaw Sándor Rózsa, the newspaper Novi Sad explained him to its readers by comparing him to "today's Babejić". The comparison indicates that the journalist assumed Babejić's name was already familiar to readers beyond Homolje.

The extent to which his name became synonymous with a hajduk can also be seen in a 1936 Vreme court report in which the insult "your lover is hajduk Babejić" was the subject of a lawsuit. In December 1936, Vreme presented Laznica as a place known as Ivan Babejić's birthplace and described Draža Gligorijević as his former companion.

The contrast between the newspaper portrayal of Babejić as a bandit and the popular image of the "Mountain Tsar" persisted after his death. Over time, the stories came to include disguises, encounters with gendarmes, secret hideouts, lovers, buried treasure and claims that bullets could not harm him. Many of these stories belong to oral tradition and cannot be independently confirmed.

In a later popular-history article, Nikodije Spasić called him a "mountain flower of the Homolje Mountains". This was a later literary description, rather than reliable evidence that "Mountain Flower" was a contemporary nickname.

== Vlach oral tradition ==
Babejić remained present in Vlach oral and musical tradition. Paun Es Durlić's Vlach dictionary records him as Babĭeĭ, a popular interwar outlaw from Laznica celebrated in numerous Vlach songs, and also records the dialectal form Babau.

In 2022, Radio Television of Serbia devoted an episode of the documentary series Trag to Babejić, entitled Gorski car. The programme presented the conflicting images of him as a bandit and a folk hero, describing him as both a "Dillinger and Robin Hood", a villain and a benefactor of the poor.

Stories about Babejić continued to be passed down through generations. One of the better-known songs is Sava Mošić's Vlach-language song "Knćiku 'lu Babau", which helped preserve his story in local musical tradition.

== Gallery ==
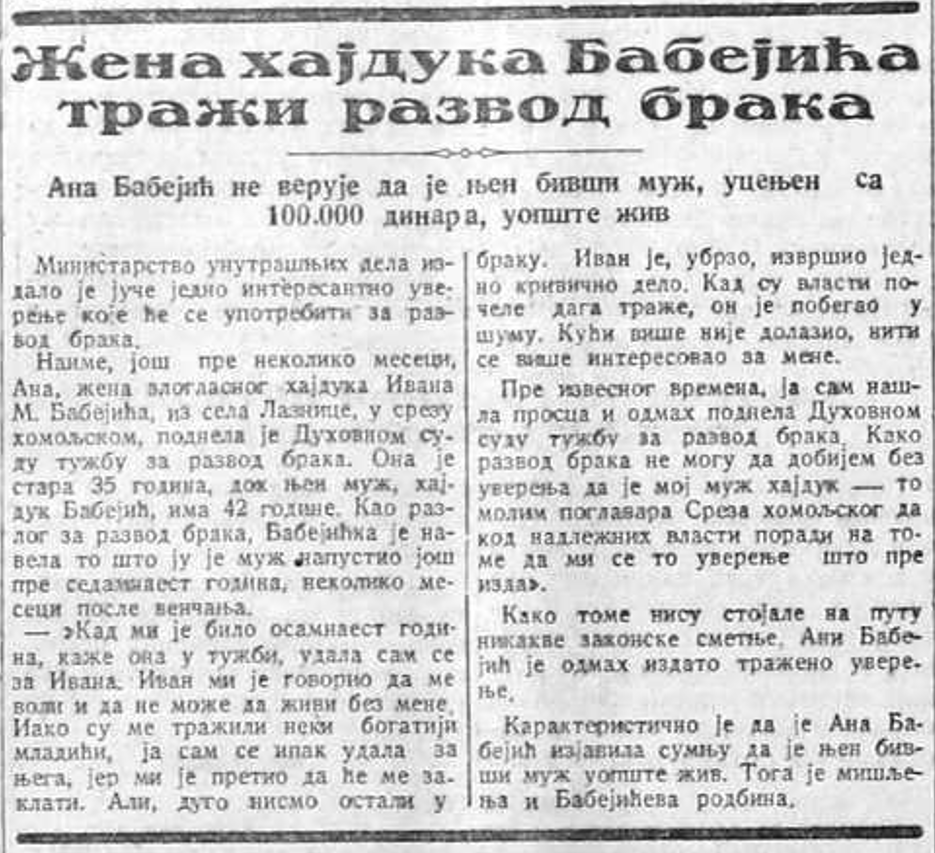
Divorce of Ivan and Ana

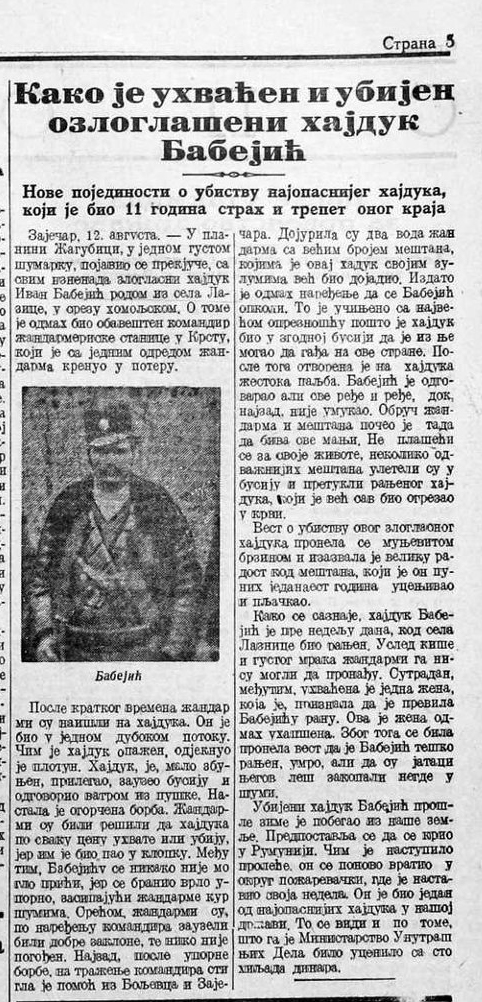

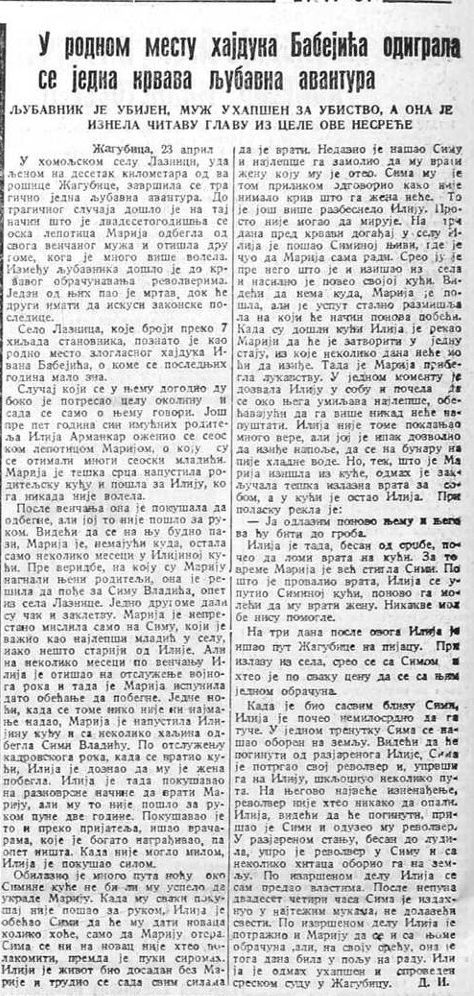

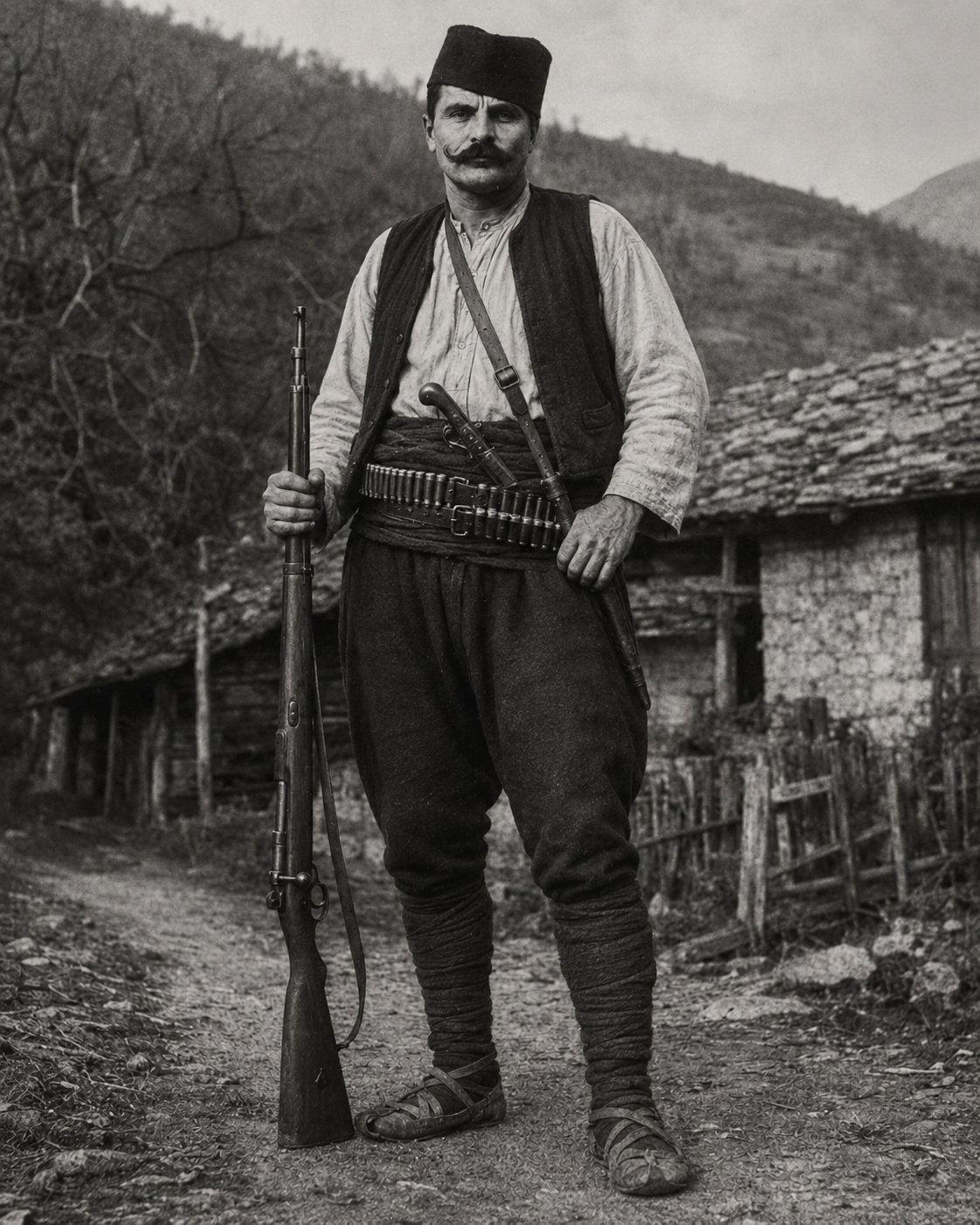
Reconstructed image of Ivan Babejić created with the help of artificial intelligence

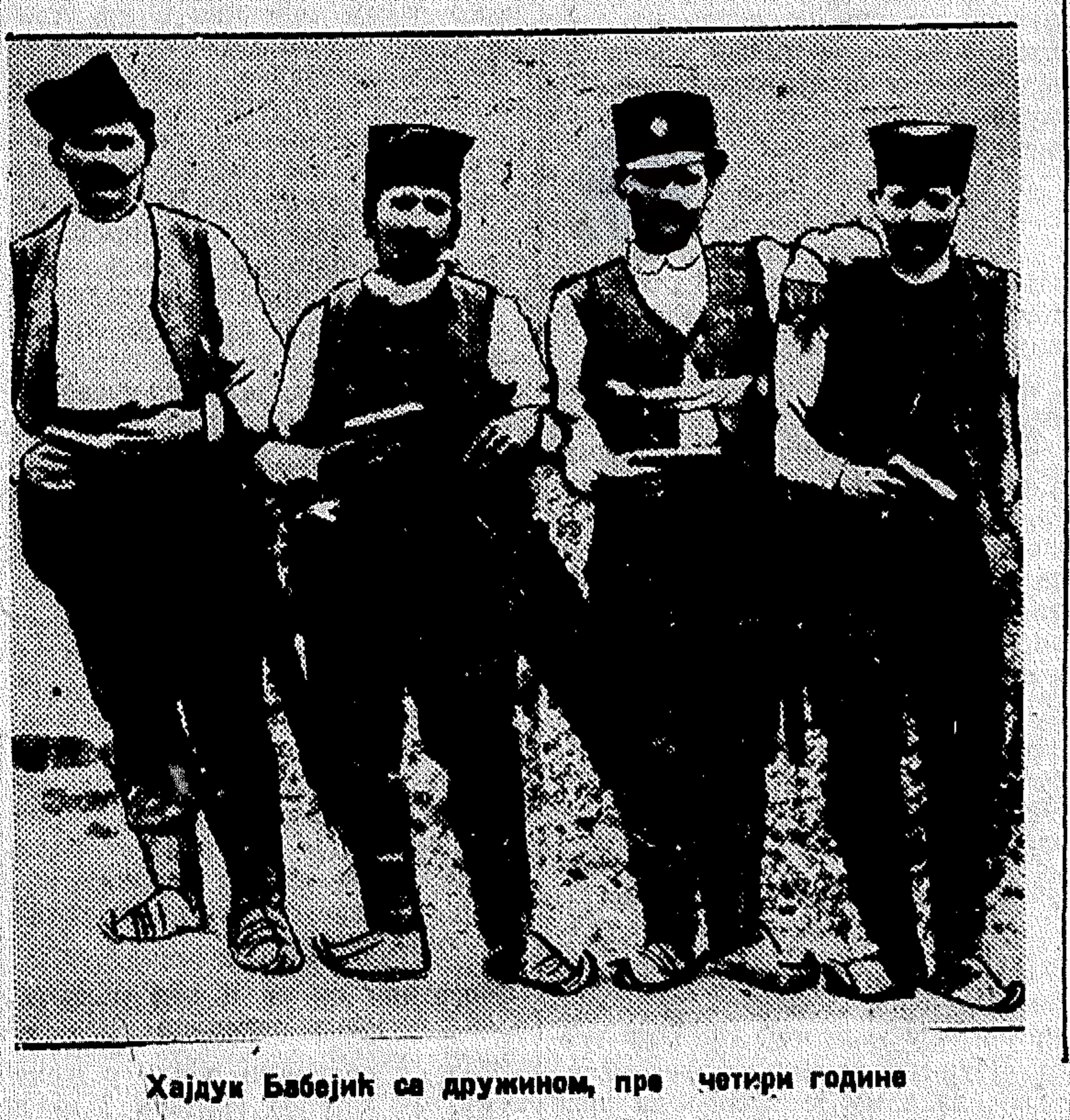
Ivan Babejić, Živojin Mitrović, Lazar Radovanović, Petar Strujić

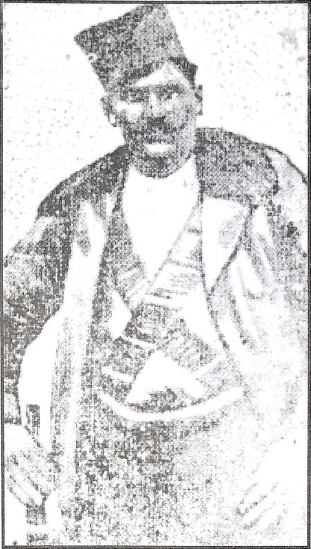
Ivan Babejić

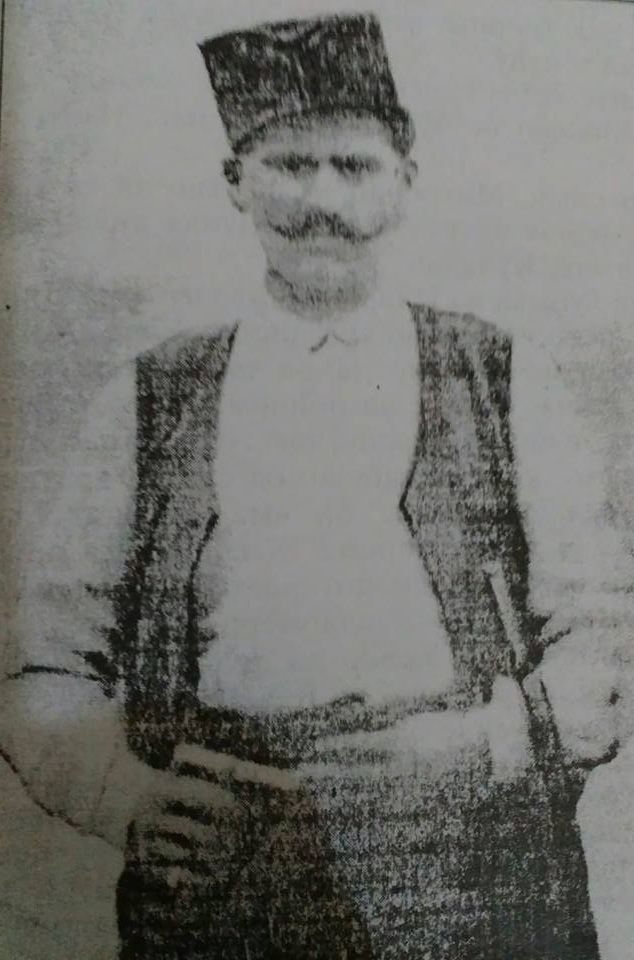
Ivan Babejić

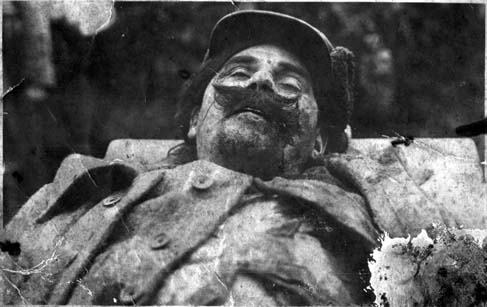
The deceased Ivan Babejić, higher-quality image

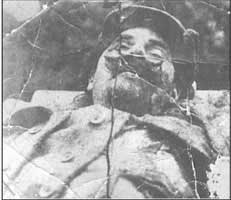
Babejić dead in Paljane. There is also a version of the story claiming that the dead man was a priest and that Babejić had staged his own death.

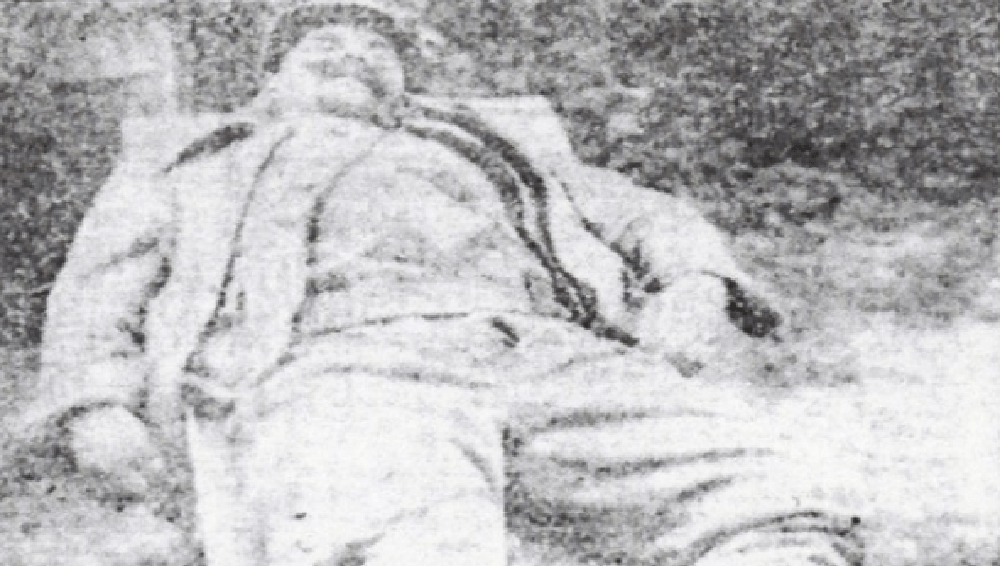
The deceased Ivan Babejić

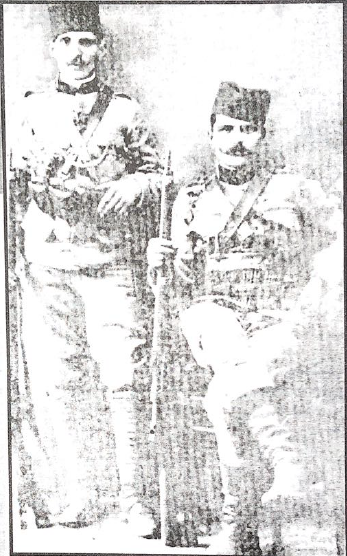
Ivan Babejić and an unidentified soldier during the war with Bulgaria

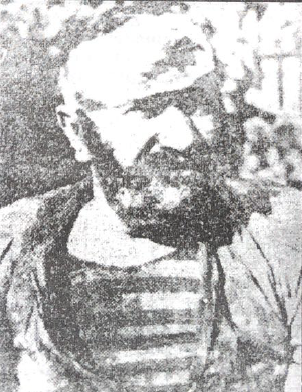
Draža Gligorijević

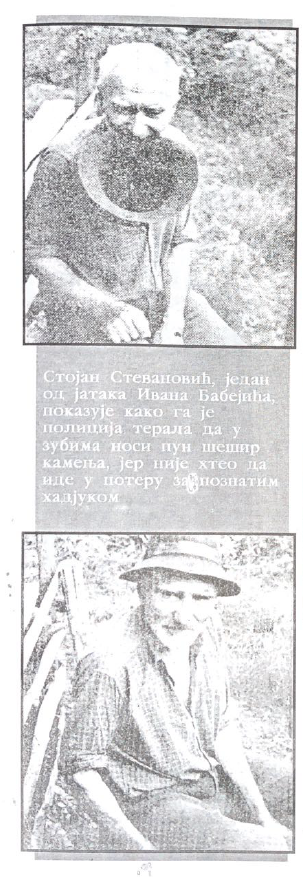
Stojan Stevanović, an accomplice of Ivan Babejić, who was forced by the gendarmes to carry his hat in his teeth through the village as punishment

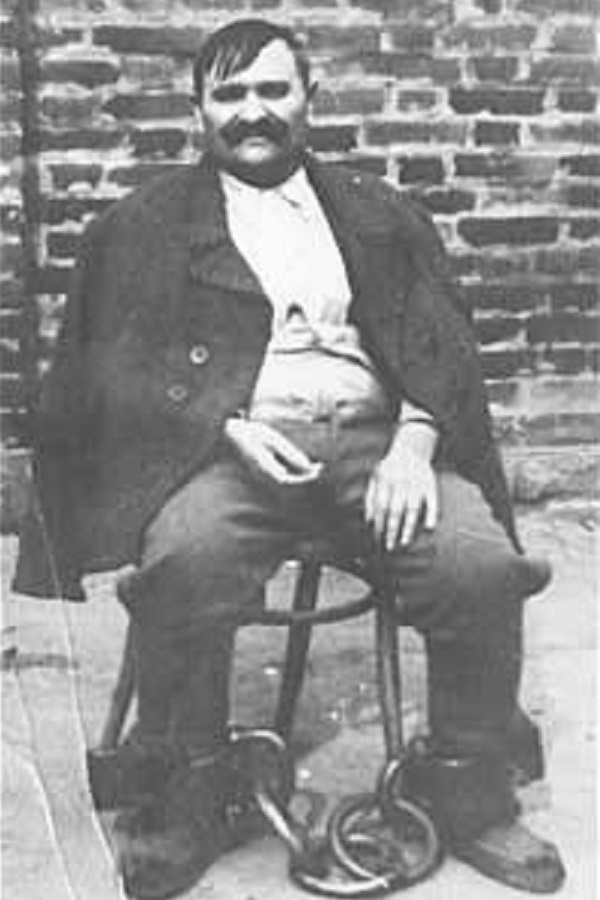
Draža Gligorijević

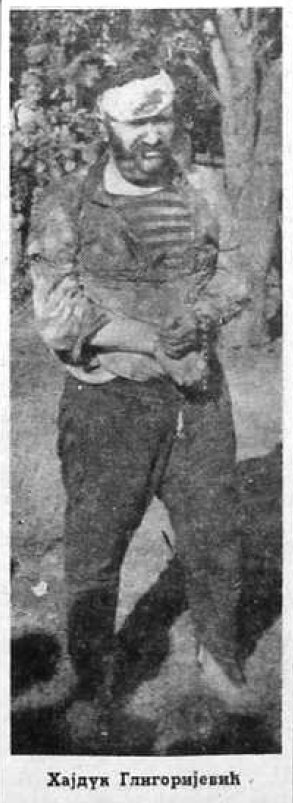
Draža Gligorijević in the newspaper Vreme, 15 October 1940

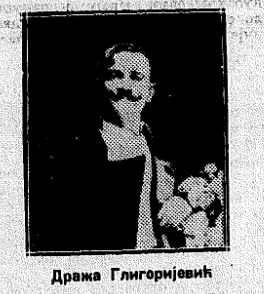
Draža Gligorijević

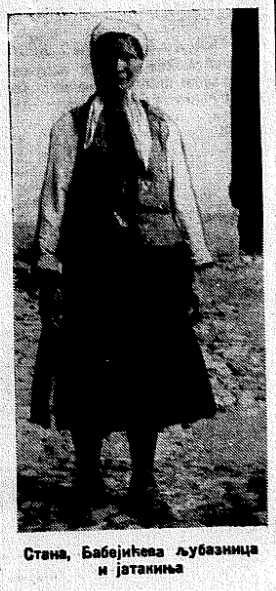
Stana, Babejić's mistress and accomplice

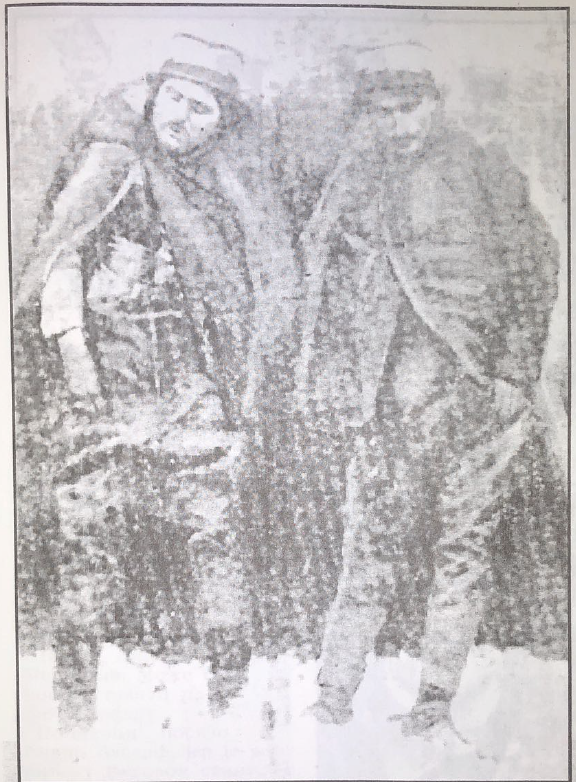
The deceased members of the Barbulović family

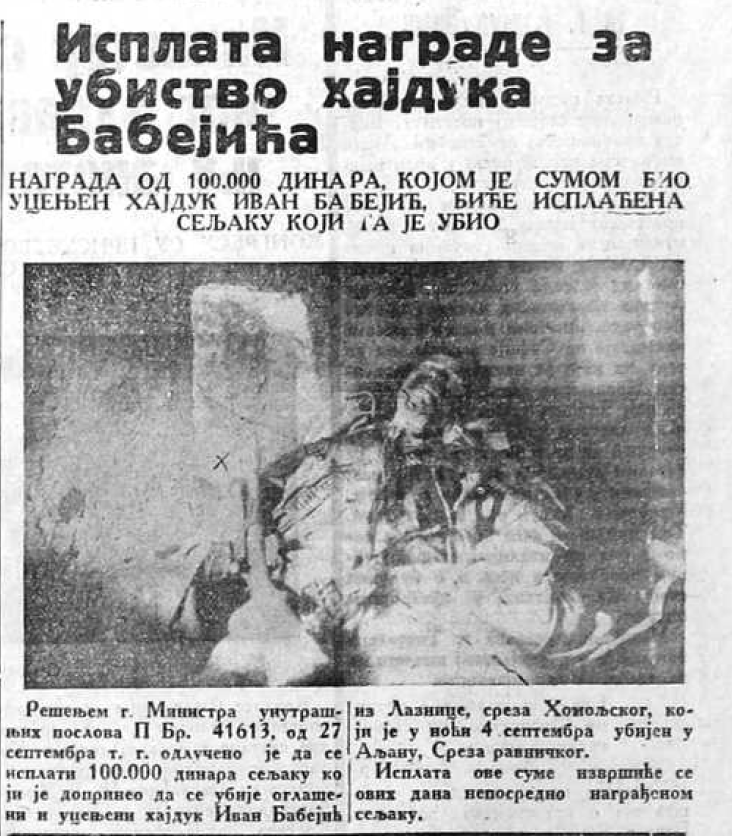
Pravda, 3 October 1934

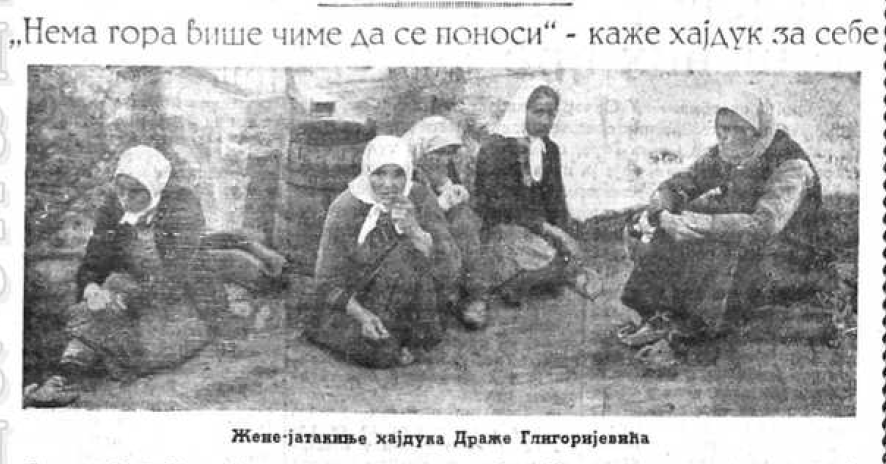
Women who acted as accomplices of hajduk Draža Gligorijević, 14 October 1940

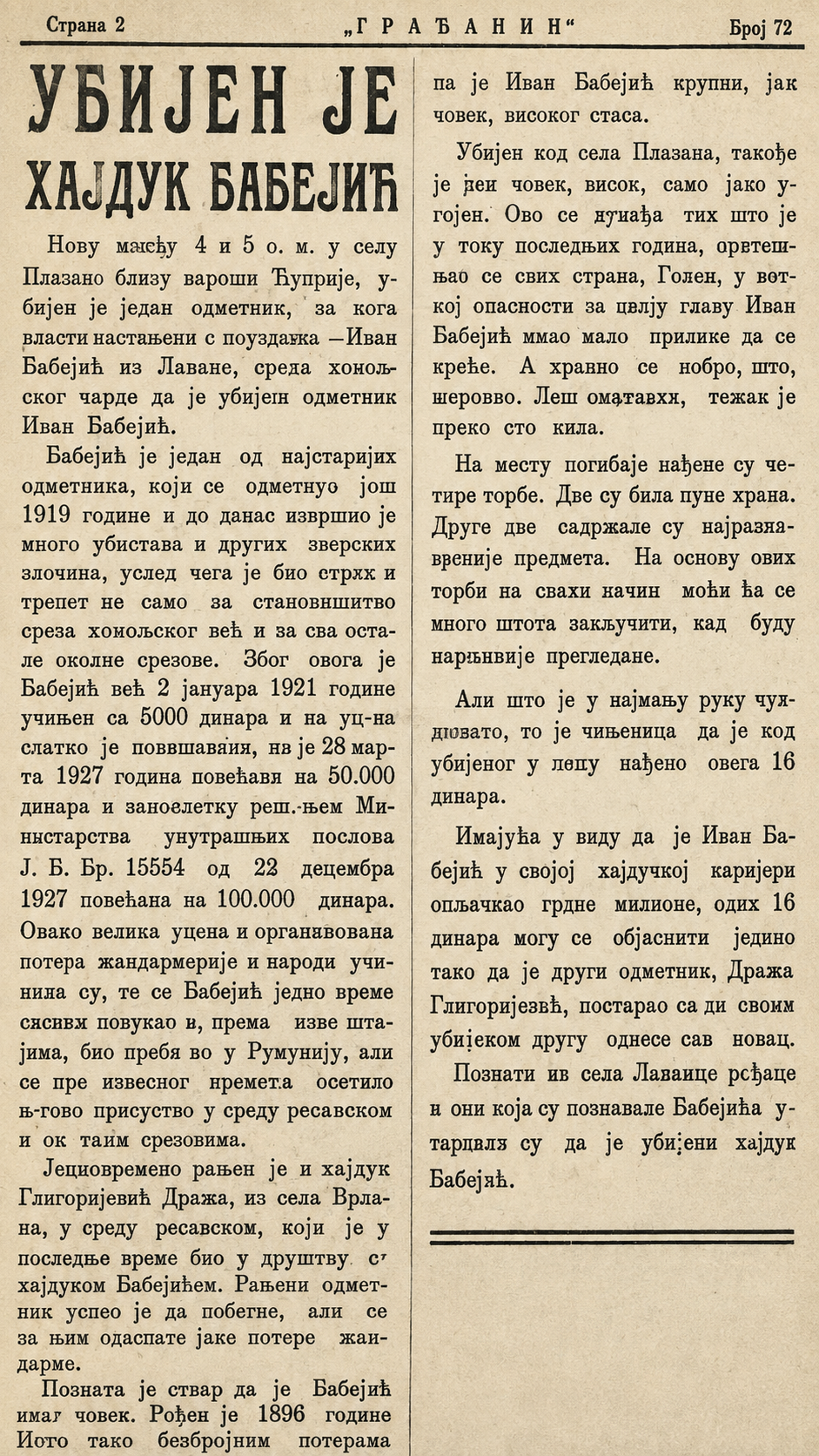
Građanin, 9 September 1934

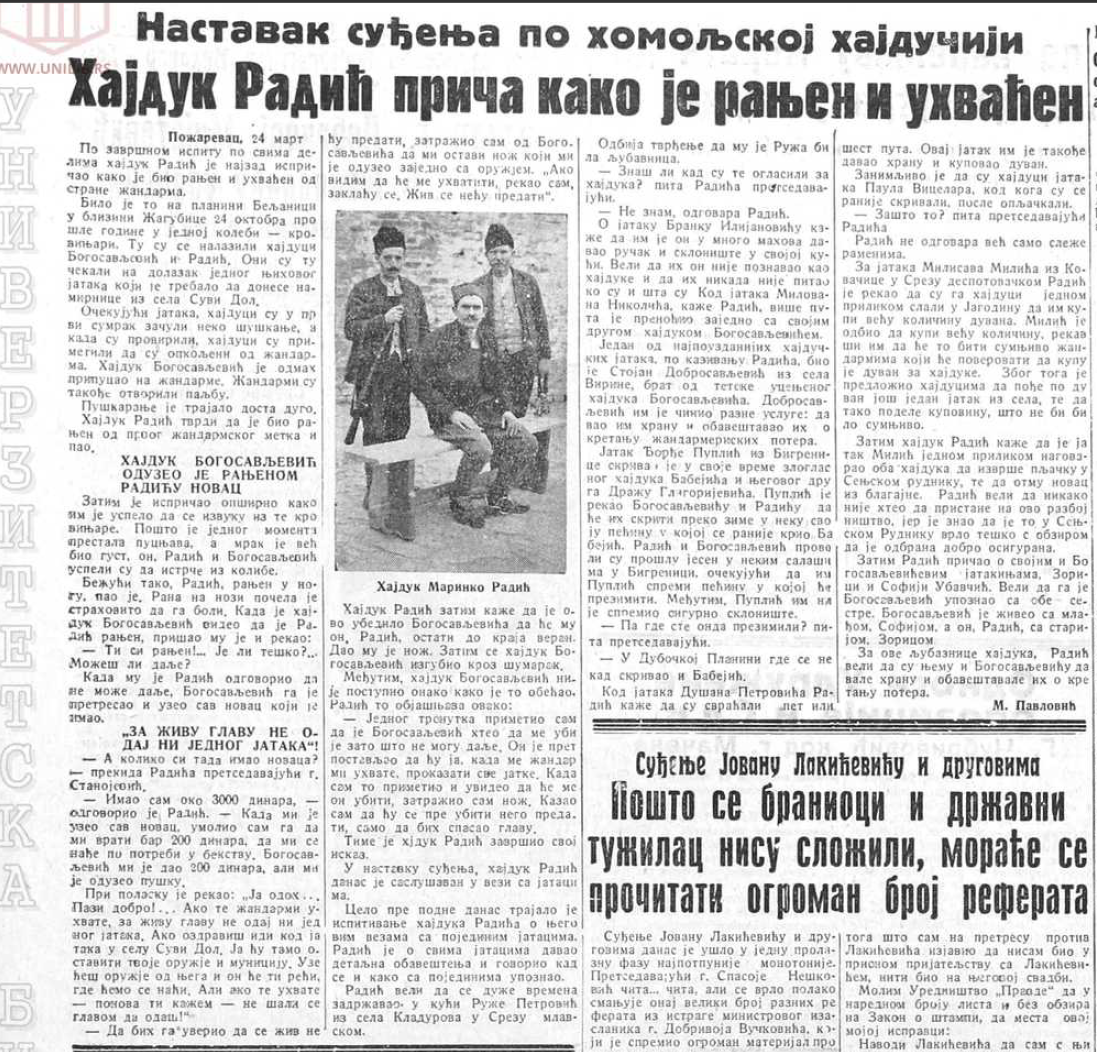
Pravda, 25 March 1937, p. 13, mentions Babejić in a report on the trial of the Homolje hajduks Marinko Radić and Bogosavljević.

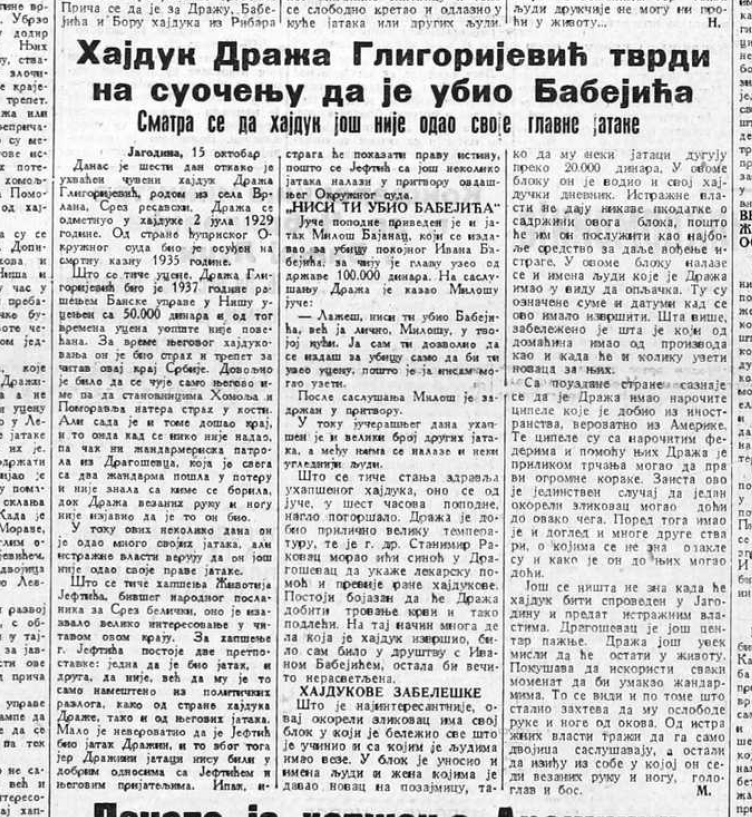
Hajduk Draža Gligorijević claims during a confrontation that he killed Babejić

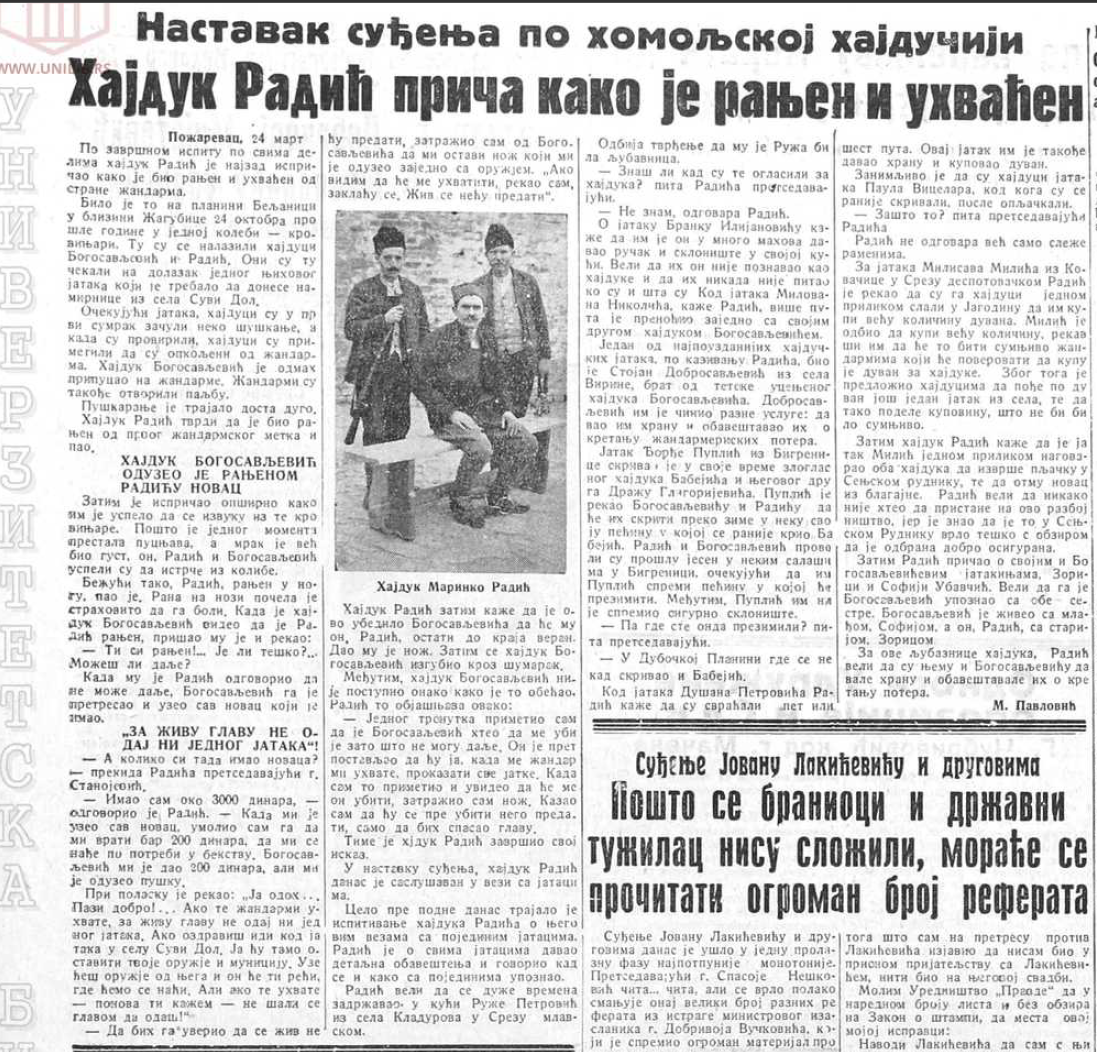
Pravda, 25 March 1937

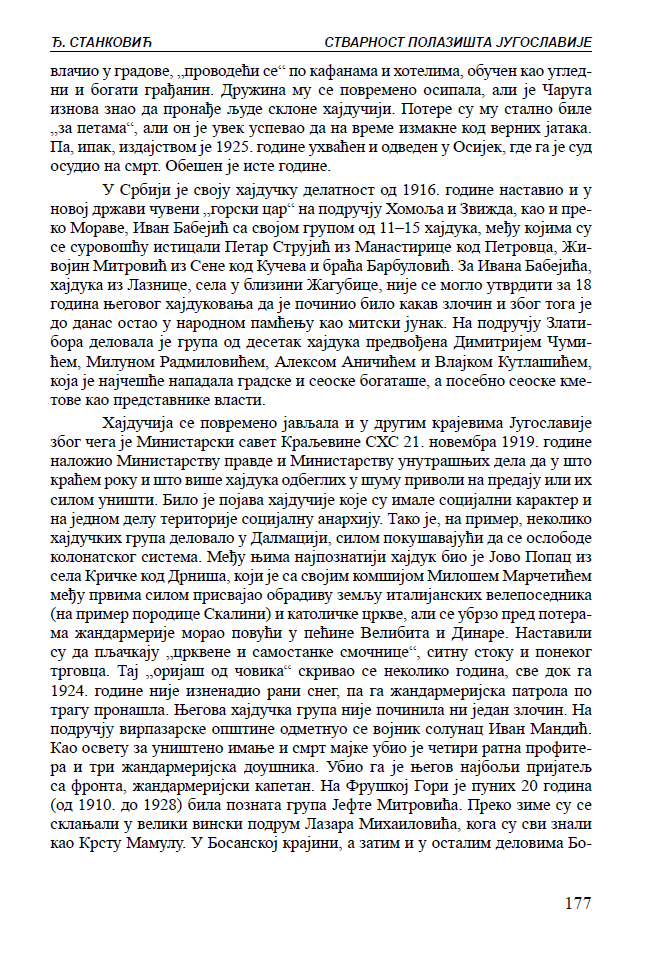
Prof. Dr. Đorđe Stanković, Faculty of Philosophy, Belgrade, The Reality of Yugoslavia's Starting Point

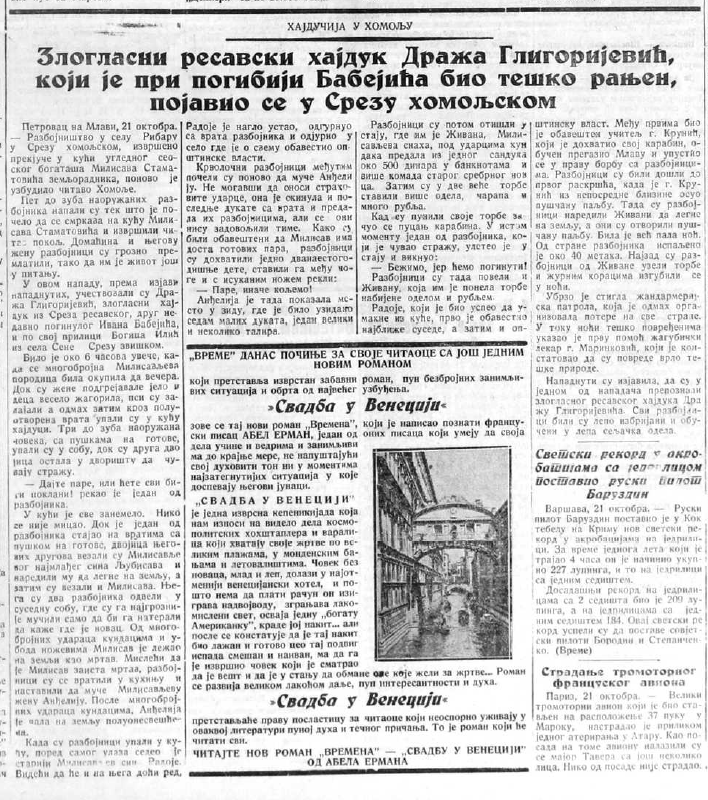
Vreme, 10 December 1936
