= Boško Palkovljević Pinki =

Boško Palkovljević

Boško Palkovljević Pinki (Serbian Cyrillic: Бошко Палковљевић „Пинки"; 1920–1942) was a prominent Partisan fighter during World War II in Yugoslavia and a People's Hero of Yugoslavia.

== Biography ==
Palkovljević was born on 14 December 1920 in the village of Manđelos (part of Sremska Mitrovica), in the Kingdom of Serbs, Croats and Slovenes (today Serbia). After finishing the elementary school, he enrolled at the High School for Mechanics in Novi Sad. Pinki joined the SKOJ while in school, and, in 1940, became the leader of the school's SKOJ section. Soon he organized student strike, during which the students demanded better conditions for studying and better treatment from professors. He was later arrested because his organization took part in the textile workers' strike. He spent two months in detention, but was released due to the lack of evidence against him.

During the Axis Invasion of Yugoslavia in April 1941, although he was not in the army, Pinki responded to the call from his party and joined the fighting, where he was captured. During the transport to the Nazi concentration camps, he managed to escape in the city of Ruma, and to steal a hand grenade and a machine gun from the provisional airport in Veliki Radinci. After that, he joined Partisans at the Fruška Gora mountain.

Pinki was among the organizers of the escape of communist inmates from the Ustasha prison in Sremska Mitrovica. After they planned the escape, on 22 August 1941, Pinki and his comrades helped the 32 inmates to escape through a tunnel they dug. Afterwards, they took them to Fruška Gora. A decision was made that four of the escaped communists should remain on Fruška Gora, while the others should be transferred to Serbia. Pinki took them to Bogatić, where they were picked up by Mačva Partisans.

Pinki took part in the anti-fascist fights and diversions. He blew up a train in Srem with a home-made mine. Soon after that, he tried to blow a bridge on Bosut river disguised as a Croatian Home Guard soldier. He approached Ustasha guardian on the bridge and asked for a lighter. The Ustasha called him to a barrack where Pinki killed him, and another Ustasha who came to help. Then he placed a mine and blew up the bridge.

Boško Palkovljević was the first Partisan courier from Srem to reach the High Command of the People's Liberation Army and inform them on the activities of Vojvodina Partisans after the Axis offensive in Western Serbia and the withdrawal of Partisans toward Bosnia and Sandžak. Between early December 1941 and January 1942, during an entire month, Pinki pressed through enemy territory. He was even captured by Chetniks, but he managed to escape and to come back to Srem with the High Command's orders.

After he returned from the bridge destruction activities on 10 June 1942, Pinki was in the village of Mala Remeta when German forces attacked. Pinki opened fire on the Germans in an attempt to slow them and allow people to escape into the woods. While he was trying to escape too, he was shot by a machine gun.

He was among the first to be awarded Order of the National Hero on 25 October 1943.

Pinki was buried at the memorial cemetery in Sremska Mitrovica. Many streets and schools in SFRY Yugoslavia were named after him including the High School for Transport in Novi Sad. Hala Pinki sports hall in Zemun is also named after him.
