= Boško Buha =

Yugoslav partisan and WWII war hero

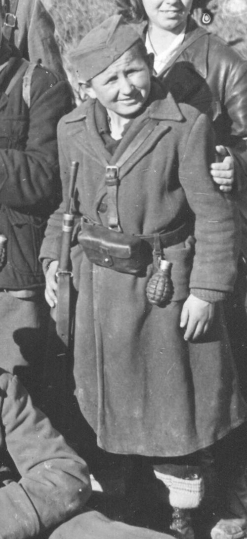
- Buha in 1942
- Born: 22 February 1923; Gradina, Kingdom of Serbs, Croats and Slovenes
- Died: 27 November 1943 (age 20); Jabuka, German-occupied Montenegro
- Military career
- Allegiance: Yugoslav Partisans
- Conflicts: World War II in Yugoslavia †: Battle of Neretva; Battle of Sutjeska

Boško Buha (Serbian Cyrillic: Бошко Буха; 22 February 1923 – 27 September 1943) was a young Yugoslav partisan and an honored icon of the Yugoslavian resistance during World War II.

== Early life ==
Boško Buha was born into a Serb family in the Slavonian village of Gradina, near Virovitica in today's Croatia. In 1941, after the Axis invasion of the Kingdom of Yugoslavia and the establishment of the Independent State of Croatia, his family was targeted by the Ustaše and had to seek shelter in Serbia.

== Career ==
In 1941 he came to Mačva and joined the Mačva detachment of the Yugoslav Partisans. He was active for a short time in the liberated Užice. After the retreat of Partisans from Serbia he joined the 2nd Proletarian Brigade of YNLA as a fighter in the 4th battalion. He soon distinguished himself as one of the most skilled bombers in a series of battles. His brigade assigned him to be their delegate to the First Congress of the Anti-fascist Youth of Yugoslavia.

Boško was killed at the end of 1943 in a Chetnik ambush. He was awarded the title of People's Hero of Yugoslavia posthumously after the war.

== Legacy ==
A theatre house in Belgrade is named after him. In 1978, director Branko Bauer made a film about his life.
