= Bombaši (Yugoslav Partisans) =

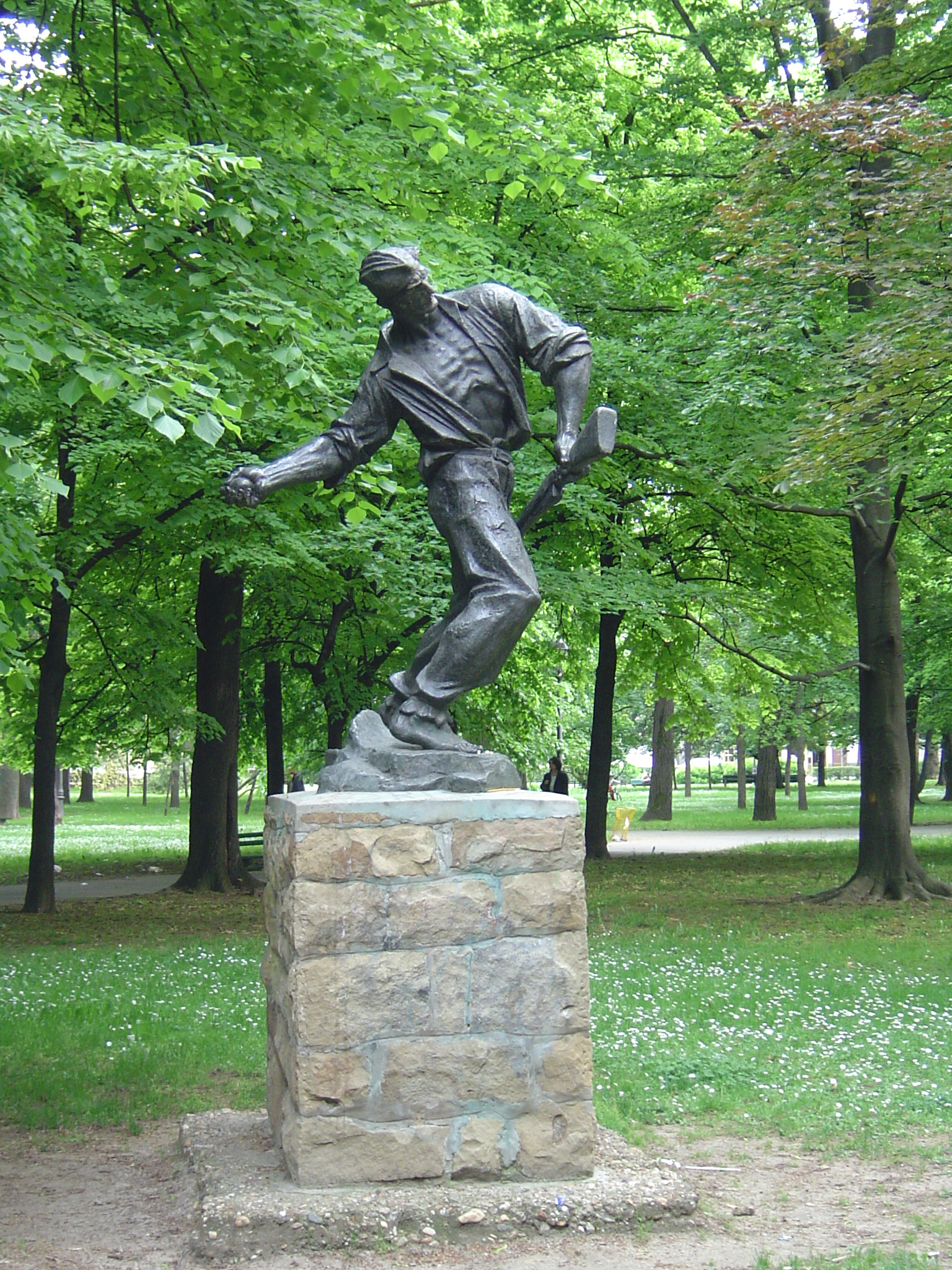
"The Bombaš", Zemun City Park.

Bombaši (Serbian Cyrillic: бомбаши; "bombardiers" or "bombers") is the name widely used for the Yugoslav Partisan volunteer grenadiers, who had a significant importance in operations during World War II and are regarded as particularly heroic. Bombaši were part of the vanguard, shock troops, and carried out special and sabotage missions, used for the takeover of fortifications. The volunteers were commonly youngsters and girls. They had the task of crawling the ground undetected towards the enemy bunkers at night, and then throw bombs into the rifle holes. As part of the vanguard, bombaši were supported by machine gunners. Many bombaši were posthumously given the National Hero of Yugoslavia award. The Yugoslav film Bombaši (1973), starring Bata Živojinović and Ljubiša Samardžić, tells the story of two friends who are bunker bombers for the Partisans.

== Notable people ==
- Boško Buha (1926–1943)
- Marija Bursać (1920–1943)
- Savo Jovanović (1926–1944)
- Vojin Paleksić (1923–1943)
- Bogoljub Čukić (1913–1943)
