= Vukica Mitrović =

Communist activist and revolutionary (1912–1941)

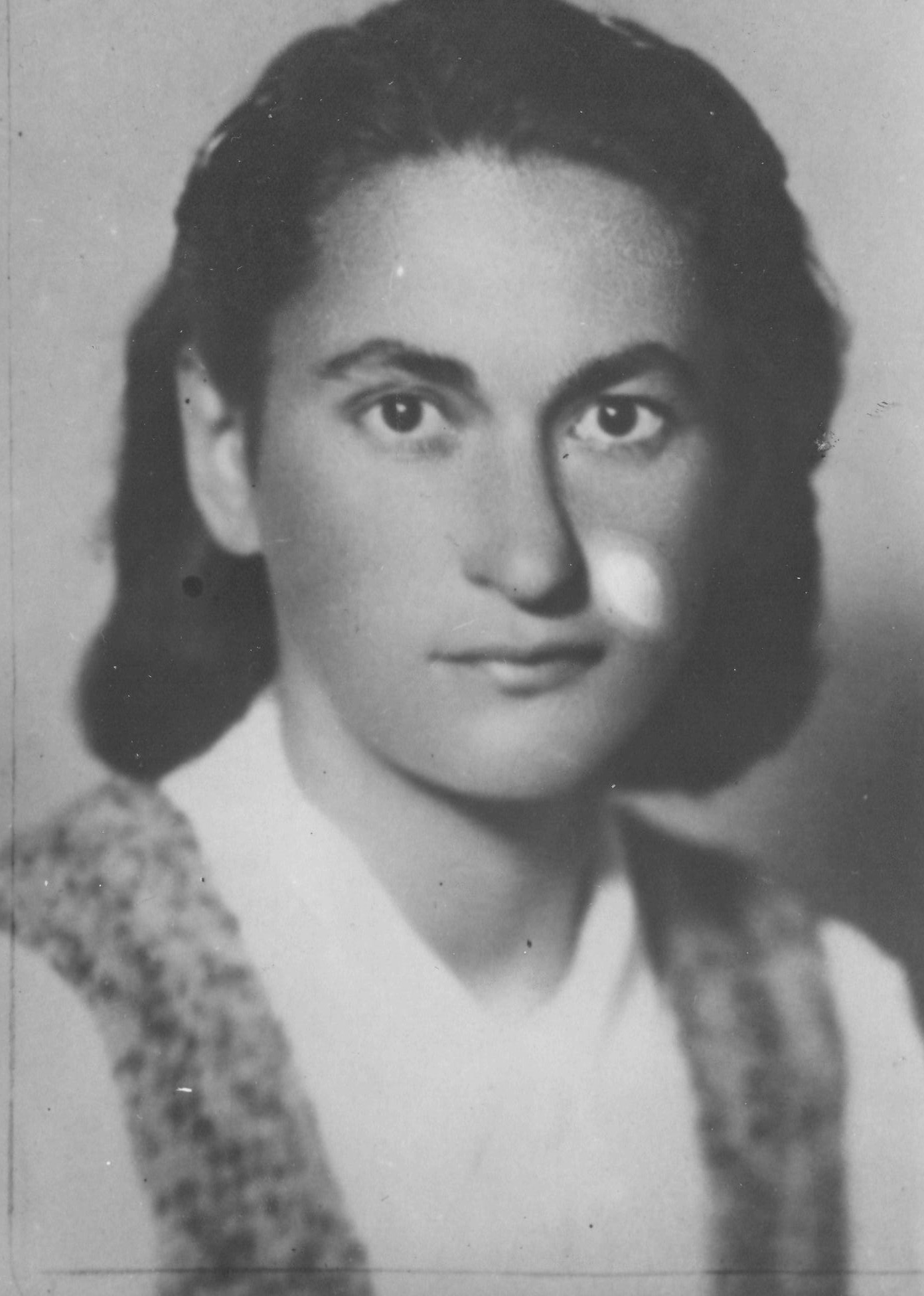
Vukica Mitrović Šunja

Vukica Mitrović Šunja (1912–1941) was a communist, revolutionary and people's hero of Yugoslavia.

Vukica was born in Sveti Stefan, Montenegro and moved to Belgrade in her early twenties. She worked in the press room of the communist newspaper Komunist and in 1933 joined the Communist Party of Yugoslavia.

In 1936, she joined the local branch of the communist party in Belgrade, where she was very active in the planning of diversionary activities. The same year she became a member of the steering committee for the textile workers union.

Vukica was arrested by the police on 1 October 1941, after an informant led them to an apartment serving as a meeting place for communist party members. She was subjected to two and a half months of torture, during which time she refused to give up any information.

She was executed by fascists on 17 December, 1941, at the Banjica concentration camp in Belgrade.

== Early life ==
Vukica was born on 28 December, 1912 in Sveti Stefan, at the time part of Austria-Hungary, to Ivo and Ivanica Mitrović. She finished primary and secondary school in her home county and then enrolled in teaching school in Cetinje. After two years, she was forced to end her studies early because of a leg injury and subsequent operation.

== Activism and revolutionary activity ==
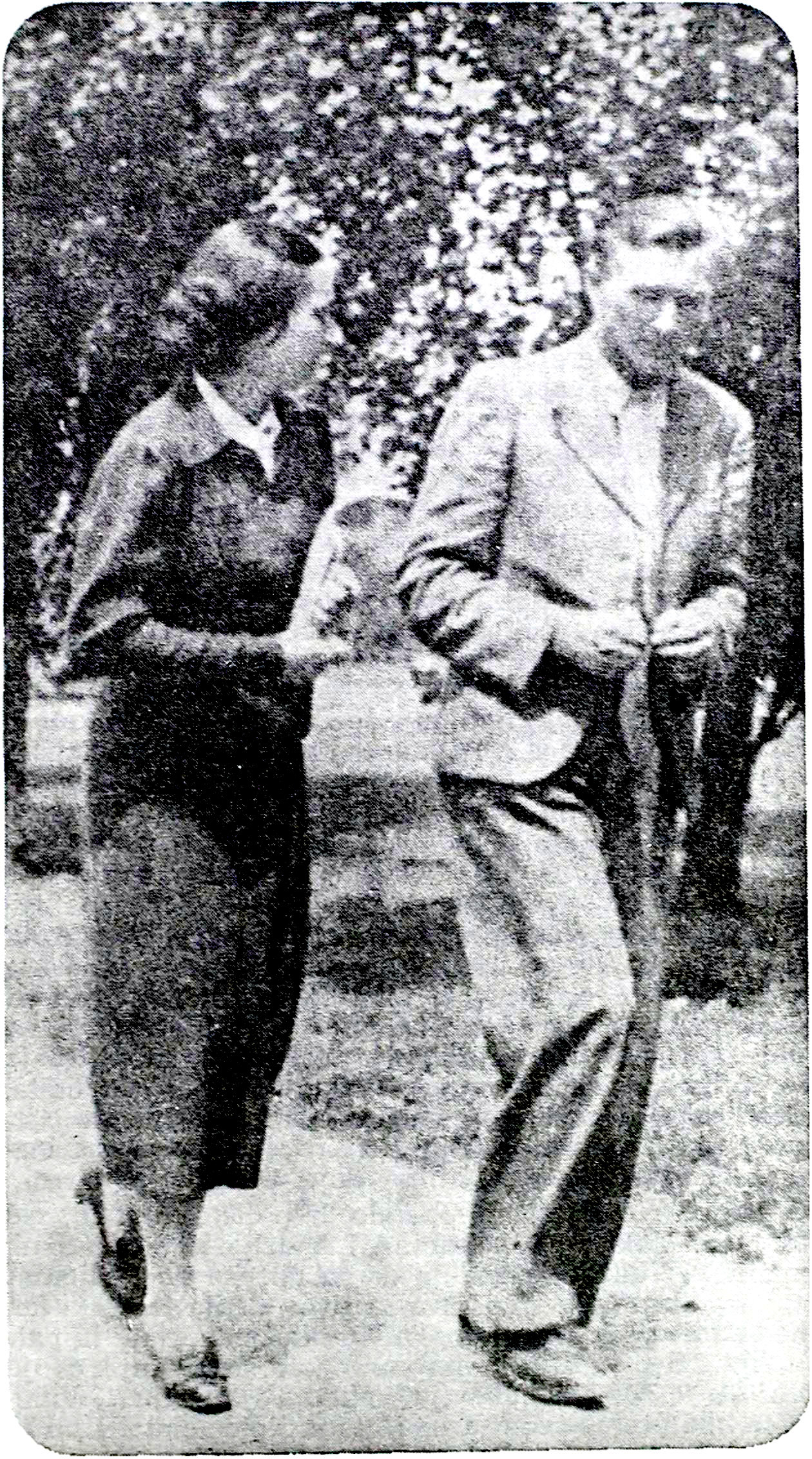
Vukica Mitrović and husband Andrija Habuš, at Kalemegdan

She only became interested in politics in her twenties after moving to Serbia and witnessing the arrest of her older brother, Stefan, a student at a university in Belgrade and member of the revolutionary movement. He was sentenced to one year in prison for distributing leaflets. Vukica visited him in prison, where she met Dušica Stefanović. She credits Stefanović for introducing her to communism, writing in a short autobiographical note: "She attracted me first of all with her friendship, and then got me interested into communism, explaining to me why my brother was in prison."

Vukica regularly visited Stefanović, whose apartment was frequented by young leftists. There she met composer Dragutin Čolić, who had recently returned from Prague. Čolić was running the illegal party newspaper Komunist at the time and he invited Vukica to help him. She took up the pseudonym "Vera" and worked in the newspaper's press room, eventually becoming responsible for technical operations of the press.

In 1933, she joined the Communist Party of Yugoslavia, receiving recognition for her "conspiratorial work".

She was arrested for the first time in 1935, during a raid on the communist party activists in Belgrade. In custody, she is beaten and tortured by the police of Kingdom of Yugoslavia. The court eventually releases her because the police failed to extract a confession.

In 1936, she joined the local branch of the communist party in Belgrade, where she was very active in the planning and organisation of diversionary activities, including assassinations on collaborators. That same year she became a member of the steering committee for the textile workers union.

Vukica is arrested again in 1938. She is taken to Glavnjača where she is tortured again, but released once more because of a lack of evidence.

In the years leading up to World War II, Vukica was a core member of the Belgrade communist underground. She lived with her husband, Andrija Habuš, also a communist and textile worker. They had to change places of residence frequently, going deeper underground after the occupation of Serbia. Vukica used false identity papers under the name Ljubica Matković and often lived at the communist party apartment on 12 Pčinjska street.

== Final arrest, torture and death ==
On 1 October, 1941, a fellow communist party member, Dušan Grubač, led the police to an apartment where Vukica and fellow communist David Pajić were at the time. Dušan Grubač was arrested the day before, on 30 September, and decided to cooperate with the police after they had tortured him. Pajić tried to confront the police and a shootout broke out. Pajić was killed and Vukica sustained a wound to the head.

Vukica was first taken to a Gestapo jail and then to the same prison where her brother had been imprisoned. There, she endured two and a half months of gruesome torture. She maintained her silence throughout and her file remained nearly completely empty, save for the remark "she did not wish to say anything about her party activities".

On 16 December 1941, after the police realised that she was not going to give up any information, she was transferred to Banjica concentration camp. She had to be transported on a stretcher, due to the severity of injuries sustained during torture. According to Marija Vuković Šantalat, a fellow inmate, when it was time to transfer Vukica to the concentration camp, the guard who came to her cell wanted to carry her, but Vukica refused and went on her knees instead.

On 17 December 1941, Vukica was executed by firing squad at the Jajinci execution site.

== Legacy ==
Vukica Mitrović Šunja was one of the first women to be declared national heroes of Yugoslavia, on 9 May, 1945.

A primary school in Belgrade is named after her, OŠ "Vukica Mitrović".

There is a monument to Vukica in Budva, Montenegro.
