= Ponikovica =

- Village
- Location within Serbia
- Coordinates: 43°52′N 19°55′E
- Country: Serbia
- Time zone: UTC+1 (CET)
  - Summer (DST): UTC+2 (CEST)

Ponikovica (Serbian Cyrillic: Пониковица) is a village located in the Užice municipality of Serbia. According to the 2011 census, it had a population of 366.
