= Manđelos =

Manđelos Манђелос (Serbian)
- Village (Selo)
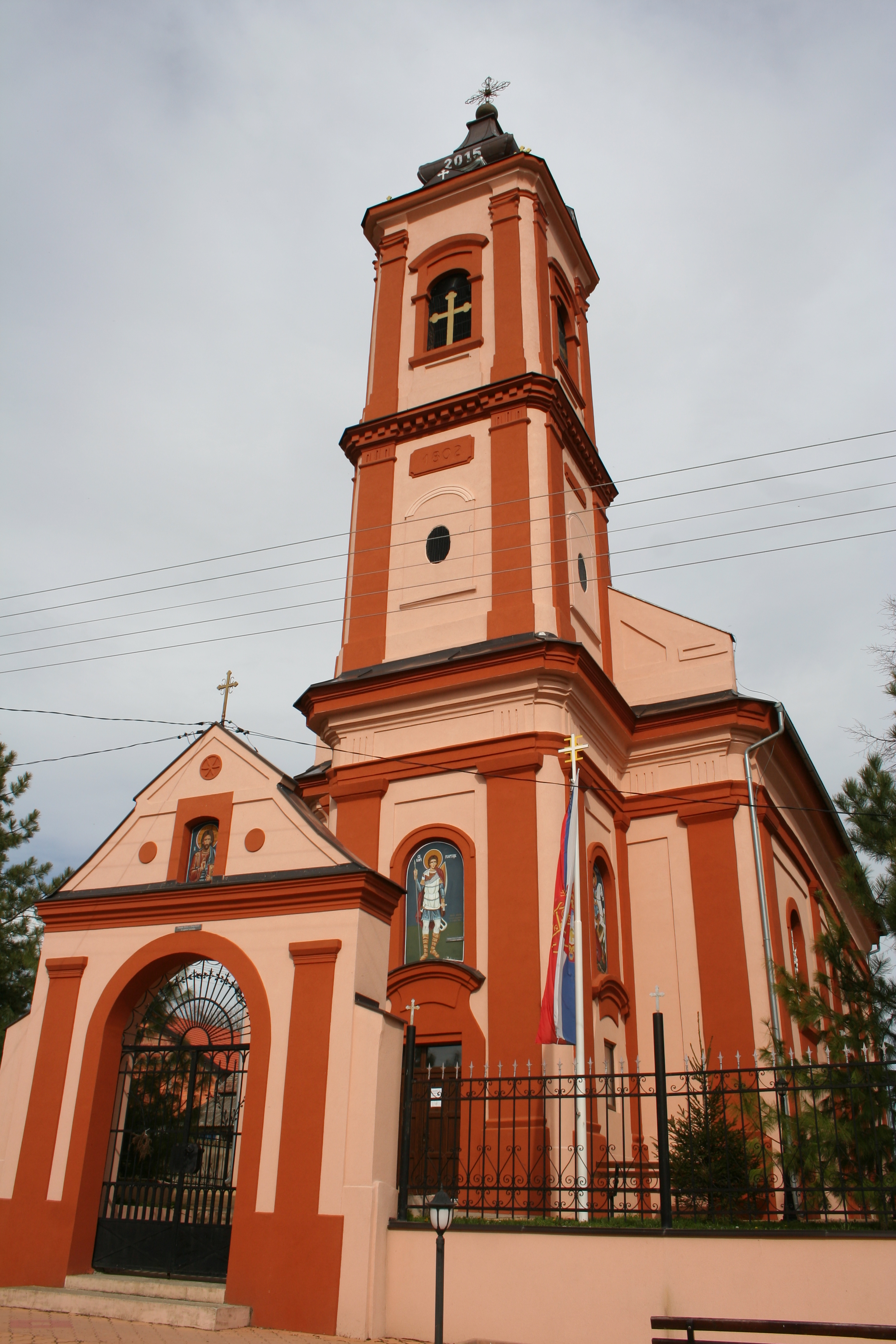

- Location within Vojvodina Location within Serbia Location within Europe
- Coordinates: 45°05′N 19°36′E
- Country: Serbia
- Province: Vojvodina
- Region: Syrmia
- District: Srem
- Municipality: Sremska Mitrovica

Population (2002)
  - Total: 1,533
- Time zone: UTC+1 (CET)
  - Summer (DST): UTC+2 (CEST)

Manđelos (Serbian Cyrillic: Манђелос) is a village located in the Sremska Mitrovica municipality, in the Syrmia District of Vojvodina, Serbia. The village has a Serb ethnic majority and its population numbering 1,533 people (2002 census).

== Name ==
In Serbian, the village is known as Manđelos or Манђелос and by the Hungarians as Nagyolaszi or Nagyolasz.

== Notable people ==
- Miroslav Bogosavac is from Manđelos
- Boško Palkovljević Pinki is from Manđelos
- Svetozar Đanić

== Historical population ==
- 1961: 1,263
- 1971: 1,418
- 1981: 1,516
- 1991: 1,470

== See also ==
- List of places in Serbia
- List of cities, towns and villages in Vojvodina
