= Paljane =

Coordinates: 43°59′10″N 21°26′19″E

- Village
- Interactive map of Paljane
- Country: Serbia
- District: Pomoravlje District
- Municipality: Ćuprija

Population (2002)
  - Total: 535
- Time zone: UTC+1 (CET)
  - Summer (DST): UTC+2 (CEST)

Paljane is a village in the municipality of Ćuprija, Serbia. According to the 2002 census, the village has a population of 535 people.
