= Slatina (Čačak) =

Slatina Слатина
- Village
- Location within Serbia
- Coordinates: 43°48′43″N 20°28′33″E
- Country: Serbia
- District: Moravica District
- Municipality: Čačak

Area
  - Total: 8.42 km^{2} (3.25 sq mi)
- Elevation: 297 m (974 ft)

Population (2011 census)
  - Total: 575
  - Density: 68.3/km^{2} (177/sq mi)
- Time zone: UTC+1 (CET)
  - Summer (DST): UTC+2 (CEST)

Slatina is a village in the municipality of Čačak, Serbia. According to the 2011 census, the village has a population of 575 people.
