= Donje Konjuvce =

Donje Konjuvce Доње Коњувце (Serbian)
- Village
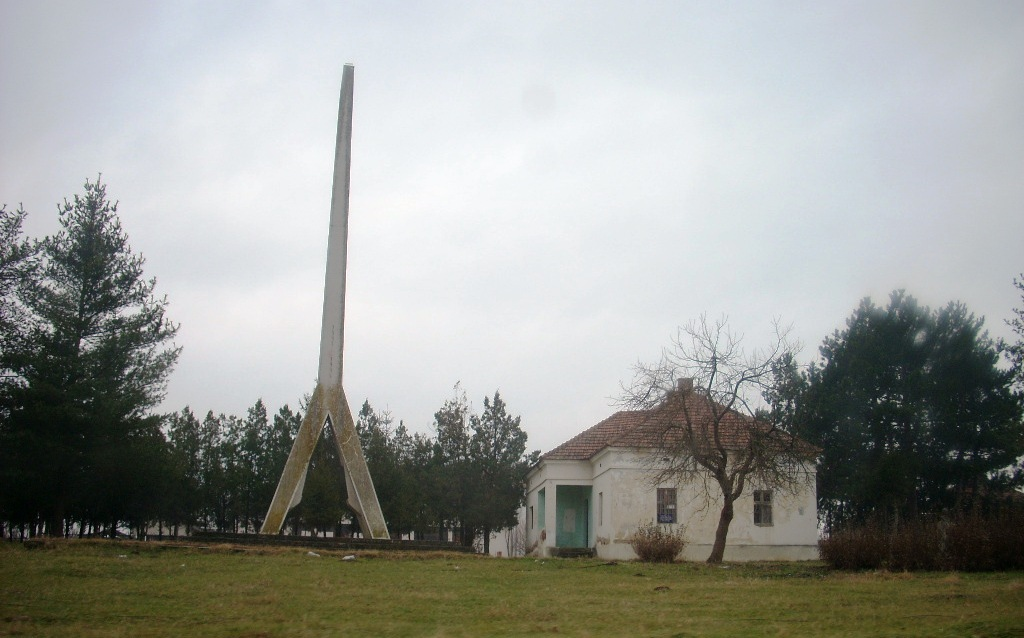

- Location within Serbia
- Coordinates: 43°02′33″N 21°41′13″E
- Country: Serbia
- District: Jablanica District
- Municipality: Bojnik

Population (2002)
  - Total: 520
- Time zone: UTC+1 (CET)
  - Summer (DST): UTC+2 (CEST)

Donje Konjuvce (Serbian Cyrillic: Доње Коњувце) is a village in the municipality of Bojnik, Serbia. According to the 2002 census, the village has a population of 520 people.
