= Jabuka (Prijepolje) =

Jabuka Јабука
- Village
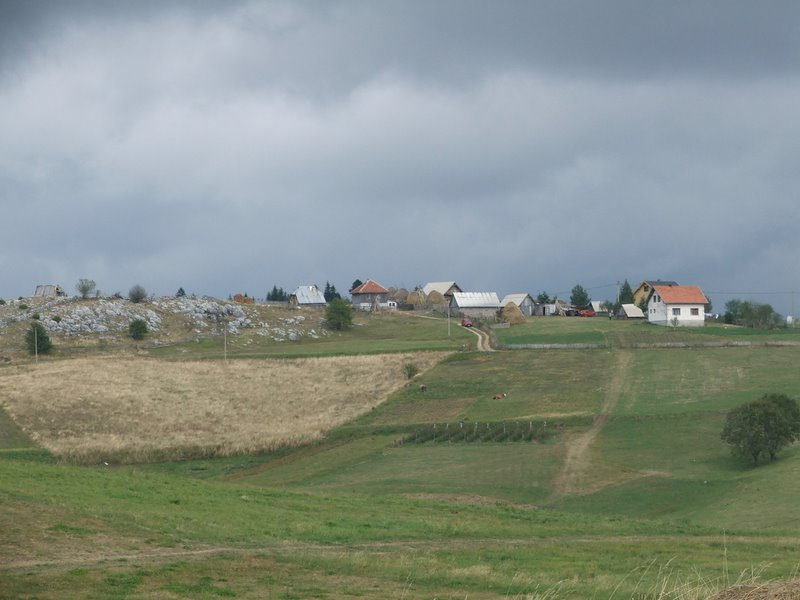
- Jabuka Landscape

- Location within Serbia
- Coordinates: 43°21′N 19°31′E
- Country: Serbia
- District: Zlatibor District
- Municipality: Prijepolje

Area
  - Total: 24.97 km^{2} (9.64 sq mi)
- Elevation: 1,196 m (3,924 ft)

Population (2011)
  - Total: 275
  - Density: 11.0/km^{2} (28.5/sq mi)
- Time zone: UTC+1 (CET)
  - Summer (DST): UTC+2 (CEST)

Jabuka (Serbian Cyrillic: Јабука) is a village located in the municipality of Prijepolje, southwestern Serbia. According to the 2011 census, the village has a population of 275 inhabitants. A border crossing between Serbia and Montenegro is located in the village, as it lies on the main road between Prijepolje and Pljevlja.

== Name ==
The village's name means "apple" in Serbian
