= Mala Remeta =

Mala Remeta Мала Ремета (Serbian)
- Village (Selo)
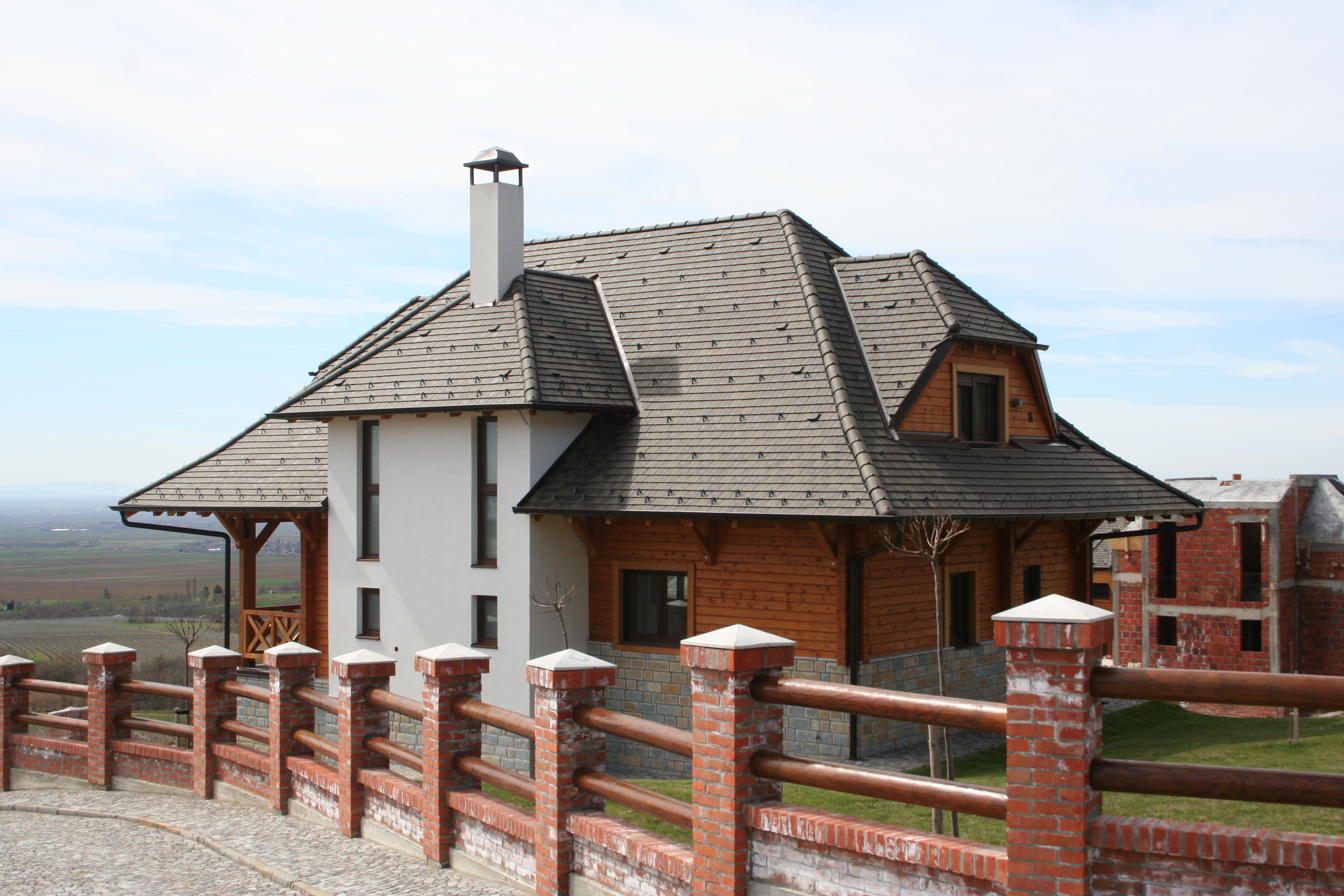

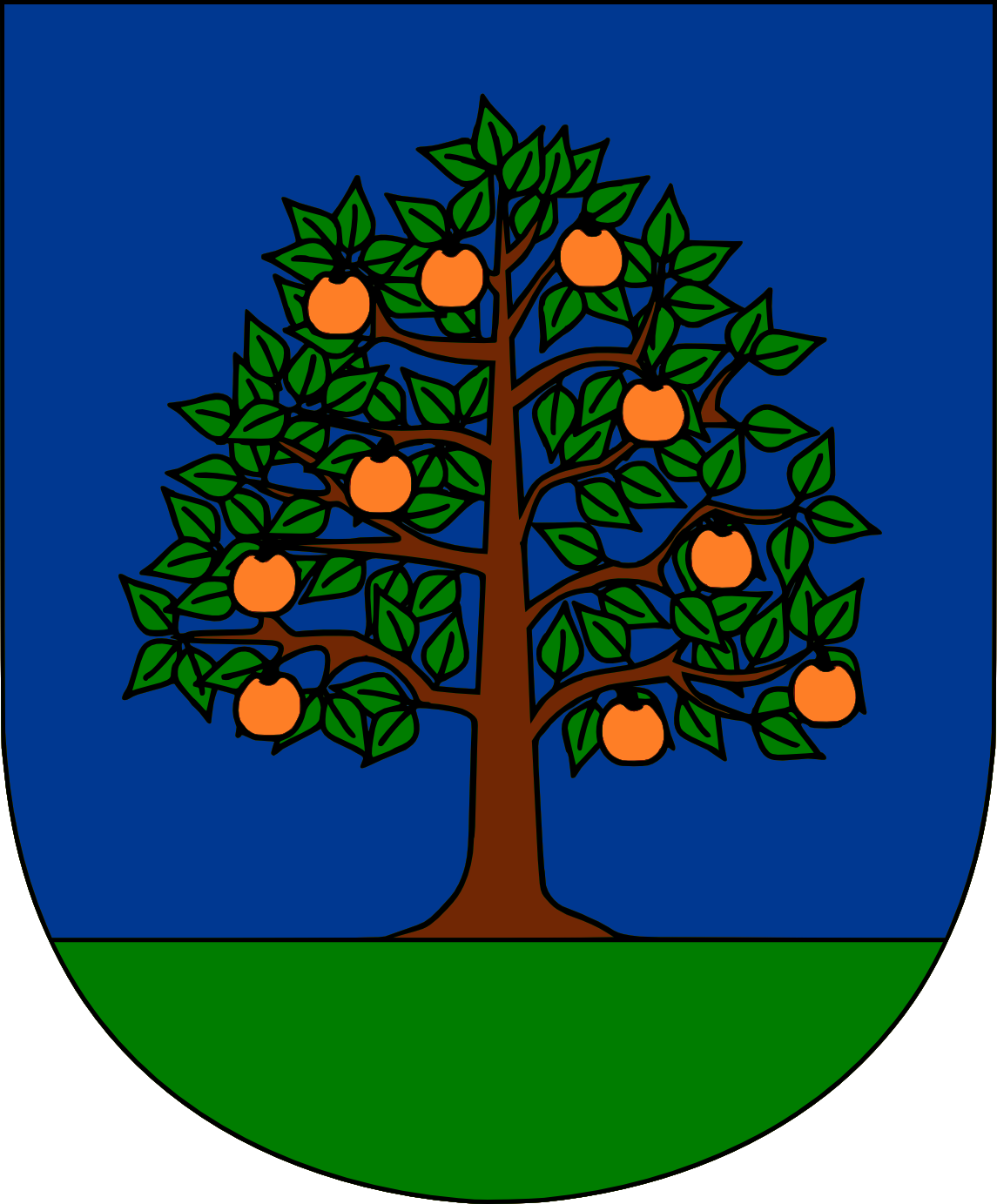
- Seal

- Location within Vojvodina Location within Serbia Location within Europe
- Coordinates: 45°06′N 19°45′E
- Country: Serbia
- Province: Vojvodina
- District: Srem
- Municipality: Irig

Population (2002)
  - Total: 151
- Time zone: UTC+1 (CET)
  - Summer (DST): UTC+2 (CEST)

Mala Remeta (Serbian Cyrillic: Мала Ремета) is a village in Serbia. It is situated in the Irig municipality, in the Srem District, Vojvodina province. The village has a Serb ethnic majority and its population numbering 151 people (2002 census).

== History ==
Following Ottoman retreat from the region, the Lordship of Ilok and Upper Syrmia was established, and the village became part of its domain.

== See also ==
- List of places in Serbia
- List of cities, towns and villages in Vojvodina
