= Žiča (Kraljevo) =

Žiča Жича (Serbian)
- Village (Selo)
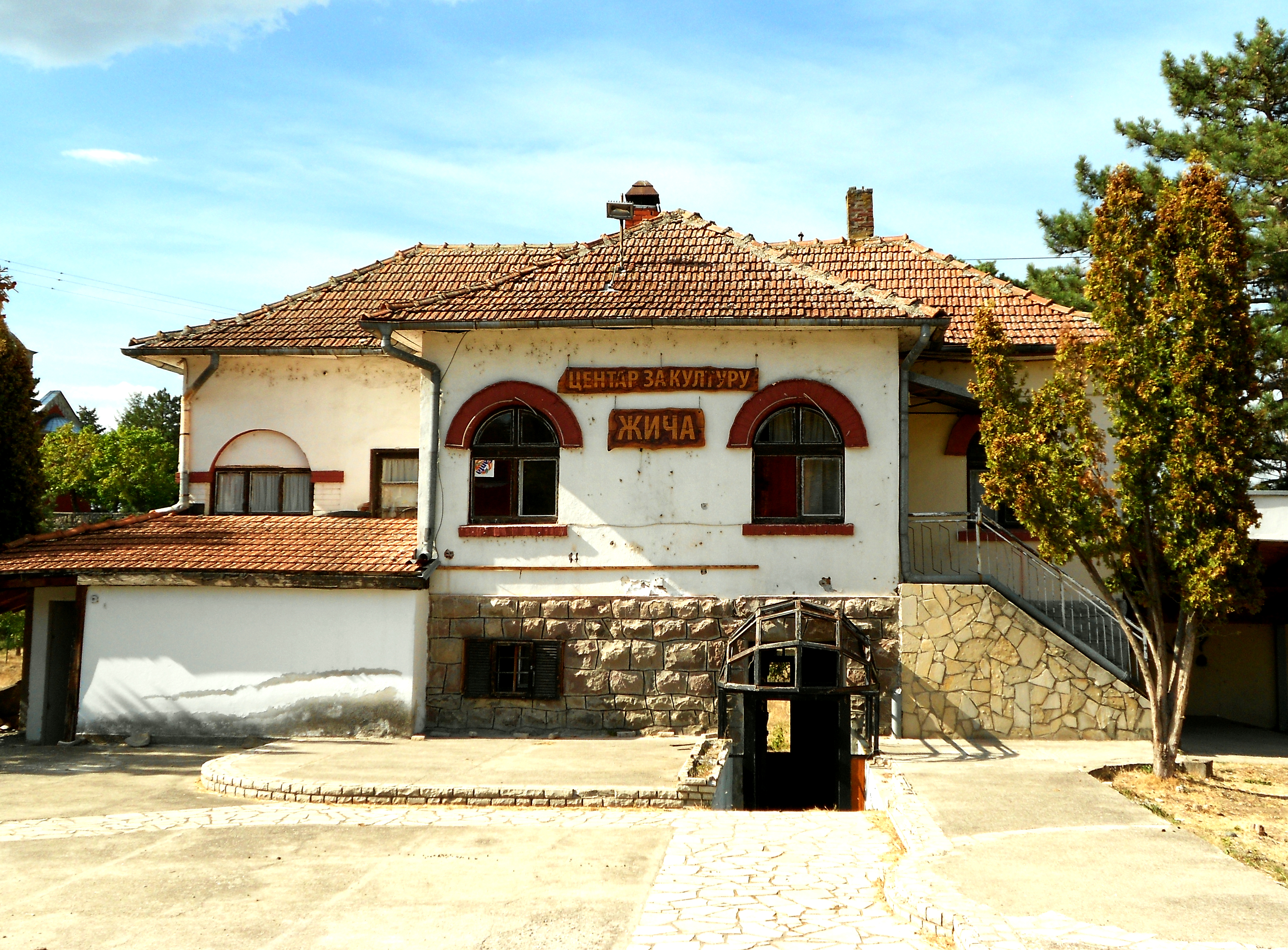

- Location within Serbia
- Coordinates: 43°41′24″N 20°39′09″E
- Country: Serbia
- Municipality: Kraljevo
- Time zone: UTC+1 (CET)
  - Summer (DST): UTC+2 (CEST)

Žiča (Serbian Cyrillic: Жича) is a village in the municipality of Kraljevo, Serbia.

== See also ==
- Populated places in Serbia
