= Laznica =

Laznica Laznica / Лазница (Serbian) Laznița (Romanian)
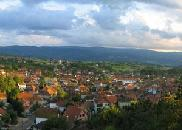
- Panoramic view of Laznica

- Location within Serbia
- Coordinates: 44°14′N 21°49′E
- Country: Serbia
- District: Braničevo District
- Municipality: Žagubica
- Elevation: 1,421 ft (433 m)

Population (2002)
  - Total: 2,063
- Time zone: UTC+1 (CET)
  - Summer (DST): UTC+2 (CEST)

Laznica (Serbian Cyrillic: Лазница; Romanian: Laznița) is a large highland village in Serbia. It is located in the municipality of Žagubica, Braničevo District. The village has an ethnic Timok Romanian ("Vlach") majority and its population numbering 2,063 people (2002 census). Laznica is settled in the north of mountain range of Homolje mountains.

== Geography ==
Latitude (DMS) of the village is 44° 14' 25N and longitude (DMS) is 21° 48' 36E. The altitude is 433 meters.

== History & Culture ==
A little is known about this village in the old ages - the only fact remains that it has been constantly populated by people from the Roman conquer of Triballian and Dacian lands that have become Dacia Superior and Dacia Minor.

In the stone hill above Laznica the `Krsia cu Albineli`, the archaeologists have found prehistorical axes, knives and everyday dishes and also, on the same spot, remnants of an old border Roman fortress.

The village was first time mentioned in Ottoman census (Braničevski tefter) in 1433 (est.) with 7 households.

== Ethnic groups (2002 census) ==
Laznica

- "Vlachs" = 1,308
- Serbs = 581
- Romanians (self-declared) = 7
- Yugoslavs = 4
- Croats = 1
- undeclared = 151
- unknown = 11

== Ethnic groups (2011 census) ==
Total population: 2351 of which 630 abroad - 1721

- "Vlachs" = 1,338
- Serbs = 150
- Romanians (self-declared) = 158
- undeclared = 25
- unknown = 50

== See also ==
- List of places in Serbia
