= Stevan Bodnarov =

Serbian sculptor

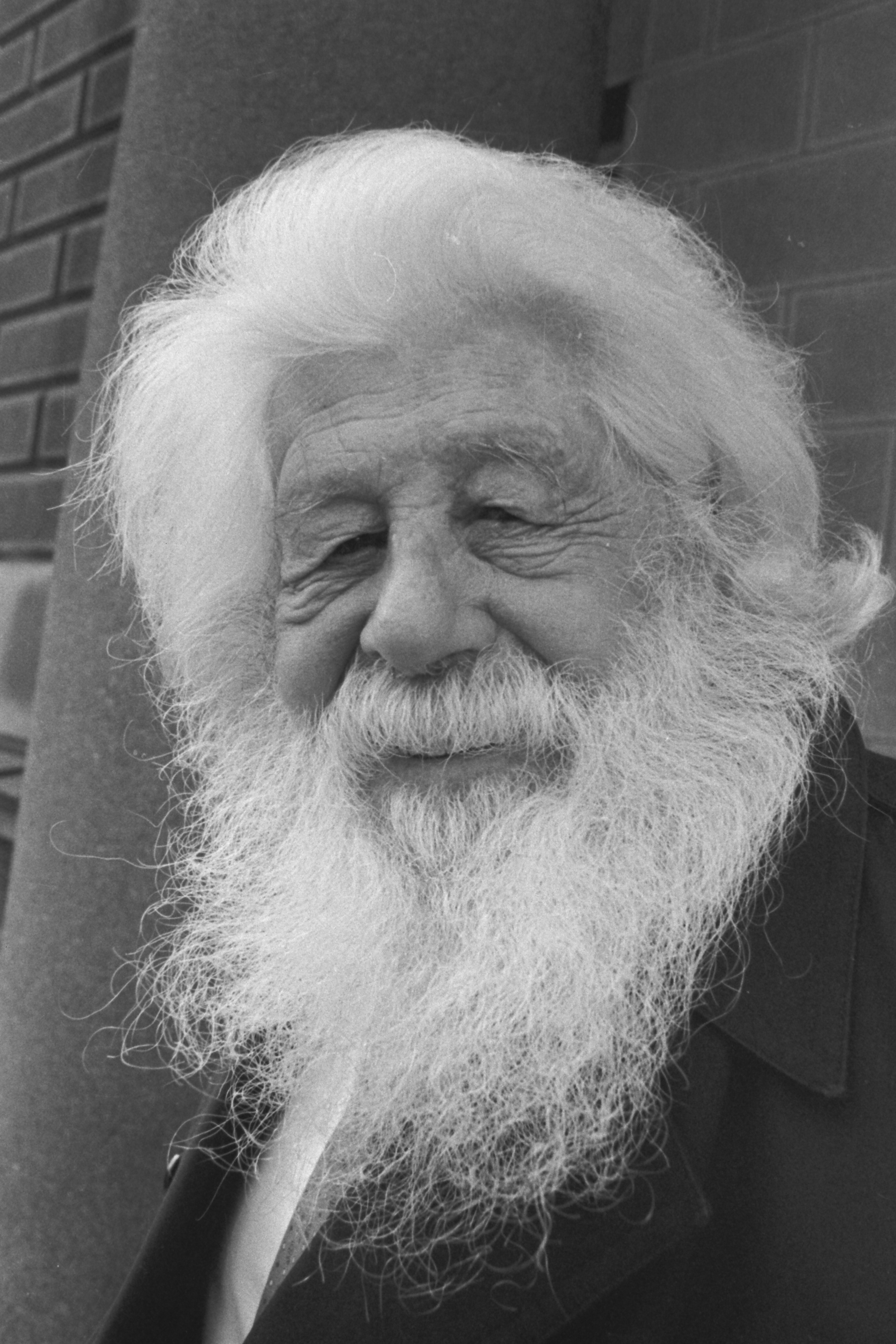
Stevan Bodnarov (1905—1993)

Stevan Bodnarov (Serbian Cyrillic: Стеван Боднаров; 12 August 1905 – 20 May 1993) was a Serbian sculptor and painter.

== Biography ==
Stevan Bodnarov was born on 12 August 1905 in Gospođinci, a town which at the time was part of the Austrian-Hungarian Empire and which today is located in Serbia, in the province of Vojvodina. From 1925, he attended the School of Fine Arts in Belgrade, where he first studied sculpture with Petar Palaviccini then painting under the direction of Mihailo Milovanović. From 1930, he participated in the spring and autumn exhibitions in Belgrade; he exhibited individually in Belgrade in 1933 and in Novi Sad in 1938.

In 1934 and 1935, Stevan Bodnarov lived in Paris and, in 1938 and 1939, he took part in the art exhibitions in the French capital. Because of his participation in the National Liberation Movement (NOP), he was interned in the Banjica concentration camp from 1942 to 1944 then, in the spring of 1944, he joined the People's Liberation Army and Partisans of Yugoslavia (NOVJ) and later other political organizations with his contemporaries

Stevan Bodnarov died in Belgrade on 20 May 1993 and is buried in the Alley of Deserving Citizens of the Belgrade New Cemetery.

== Works ==
Among the pictorial works of Stevan Bodnarov, we can cite a Self-portrait painted in 1932 and kept in the Matica srpska museum, a portrait of a Gypsy Woman and a Landscape near Pudarci, the two dated 1936.

As a renowned sculptor portraitist, Stevan Bodnarov produced many busts, such as those of Pjer Križanić, Ljubica Sokić (Skopje Museum), Ismet Mujezinović (National Museum in Belgrade), Dimitrije Tucović (Slavija Square in Belgrade), as well as monuments like that of Janko Čmelik in Stara Pazova (1948), that of the victims of the Banjica camp in Jajinci (1951), that of the soldiers killed in action in Kula (1951) or even that of Bijelo Polje (1952). He is also the author of the busts of Ivo Lola Ribar, Ivan Milutinović and Đuro Đaković which adorn the Tomb of People's Heroes, Belgrade.
