= Tomb of National Heroes =

Tomb of National Heroes may refer to:

- Tomb of National Heroes, Ljubljana, a monument in Ljubljana
- Tomb of National Heroes, Zagreb, a monument in Zagreb
- Tomb of National Heroes, Belgrade, a monument in Belgrade
