= Seven Secretaries of the SKOJ =

Group of Yugoslav young communists

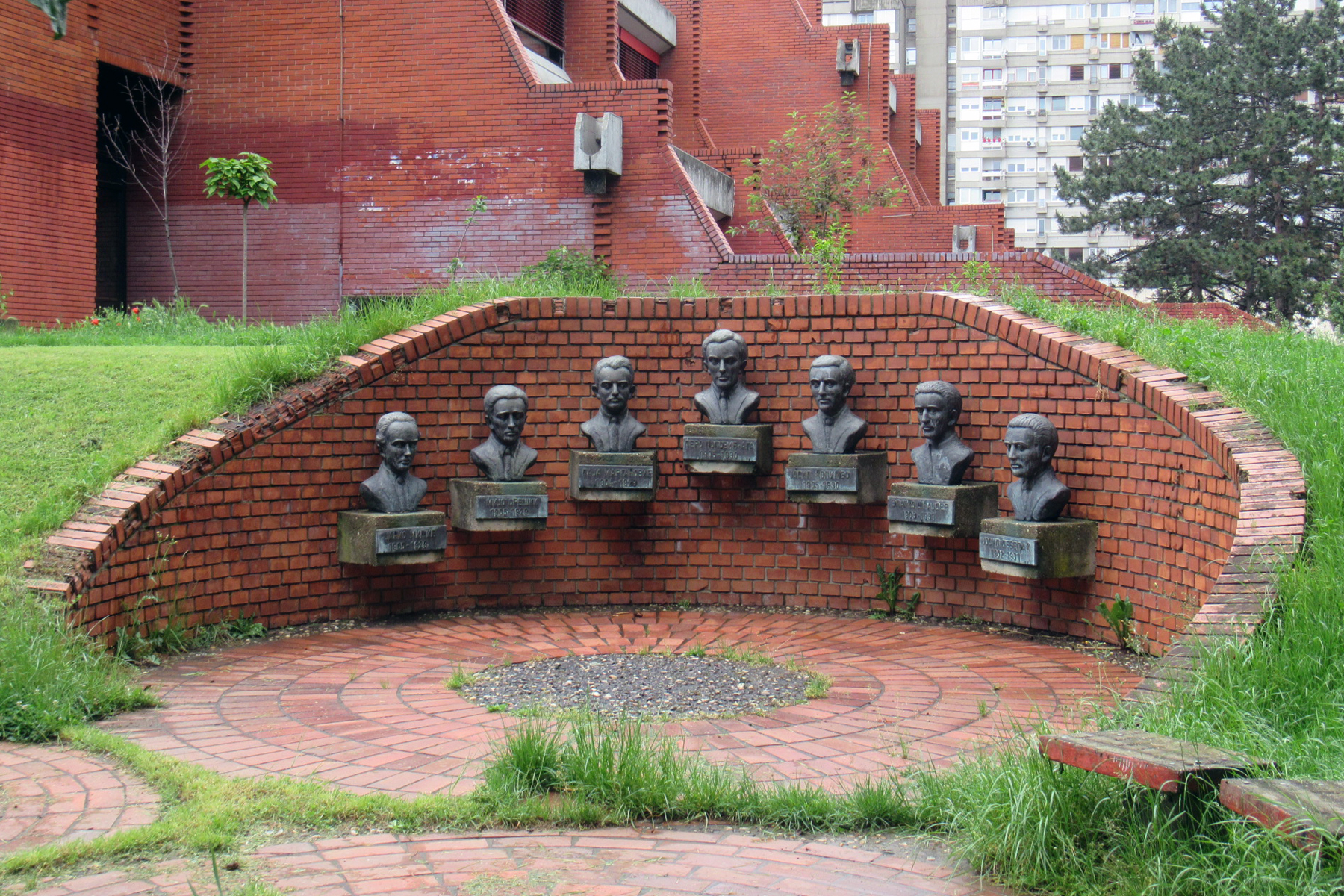
Busts of the Seven Secretaries in the backyard of the School "Sedam sekretara SKOJ-a" in New Belgrade (renamed to "Laza Kostić" in 2005)

The Seven Secretaries of the SKOJ (Serbo-Croatian: Седам секретара СКОЈ-а, Sedam sekretara SKOJ-a; Slovene: Sedem sekretarjev SKOJ-a) refers to a group of seven men who led the League of Communist Youth of Yugoslavia (SKOJ) and were secretaries of its Central Committee in the 1920s, during the persecution of the Communists in the Kingdom of Yugoslavia. All seven were killed by the royal police or died in prison during the 6 January Dictatorship between June 1929 and October 1931. After World War II, during the period of Communist rule in Yugoslavia, they were praised as heroes and many schools, streets and other institutions were named "Seven Secretaries of the SKOJ". The seven secretaries were: Josip Debeljak, Josip Kolumbo, Paja Marganović, Janko Mišić, Mijo Oreški, Pero Popović Aga and Zlatko Šnajder.

== Background ==
The League of Communist Youth of Yugoslavia was founded on 10 October 1919 in Zagreb, as a youth wing of the Communist Party of Yugoslavia (KPJ) (then still named "Socialist Labor Party of Yugoslavia [Communists]"). It accepted the program of the Young Communist International.

Soon after its founding, the organization faced intense repression:

- In December 1920, all communist propaganda was banned with the issue of the Obznana decree.
- In August 1921, the Law on the Protection of the State completely outlawed all communist organizations, leading both the KPJ and SKOJ to go underground.

SKOJ was notably more radical, leftist and revolutionary than the KPJ. Many SKOJ members grew disappointed by the KPJ's inactivity despite its fierce persecution. This disillusionment led some SKOJ members to resort to violent acts, including political assassinations. The outcome was even harsher persecution of communists, culminating in the complete destruction of SKOJ by 1922.

The period between 1922 and 1929 was marked by attempts to revive SKOJ activities. Many former SKOJ members became highly ranked leaders within the KPJ between 1925 and 1928. By 1928 they had aligned with Josip Broz Tito and his faction during the ongoing internal struggle within the KPJ. By the end of this period, SKOJ had stabilized again, with around 1,500 members.

In January 1929, King Alexander I of Yugoslavia established the 6 January Dictatorship, which resulted in even fiercer persecution of all government opponents, especially communists. In response, the KPJ and SKOJ proclaimed an armed uprising against the royal government. This resulted in the destruction of most KPJ and SKOJ cells, the killing of several young communist activists by the police (Đuro Đaković, Nikola Hećimović) and in long prison sentences for dozens of others. Ultimately, this led to the end of the organized political work for the SKOJ for several years.

== Biographies of the seven ==
- Janko Mišić (born 20 February 1900 in Slani Dol) was a student at the Higher Trade Academy. He was among the original founders of the SKOJ in 1919. In 1921, he was a member of the "Red Justice" group, which organized several political assassinations of government figures. He was first a member, and then the organizational secretary, of the Central Committee of the SKOJ. In 1924, he became a secretary of the Union of Workers' Youth of Yugoslavia, a front organization established by the SKOJ. In July 1924, he took part in the 4th congress of the Young Communist International in Moscow. From August 1926 to September 1928, Mišić studied at the Sverdlov Communist University in Moscow. He was also a journalist for "Borba", "Omladinska borba", "Mladi radnik" and other newspapers.
- Mijo Oreški (born 6 September 1905 in Zagreb) was a bricklayer. He became a member of the SKOJ in 1923. He served as a secretary of the Central Committee of the SKOJ and was one of the reporters at the 3rd Congress of the SKOJ (1926).
- Pavle "Paja" Marganović (born 17 April 1904 in Deliblato) was a shoemaker who joined SKOJ in 1921, just as its persecution was beginning. He was also active in the trade unions. In 1923, he became a member of the Central Administration of the Yugoslav Leather Workers' Union, and then in 1924, its secretary. In 1924, he took part in the 3rd congress of the Red Sport International in Moscow. From 1924 to 1928, Marganović studied at the Sverdlov Communist University in Moscow. When he returned to Yugoslavia in 1928, he was elected secretary of the Central Committee of the SKOJ. At the 4th Congress of the KPJ in November 1928, Marganović became a member of the Central Committee of the KPJ.
- Zlatko Šnajder (born 15 March 1903 in Obrež) joined SKOJ in 1919. In 1924, he became one of the secretaries of the Central Committee of the SKOJ. He was the main reporter at the 3rd Congress of the SKOJ (1926). He was an editor in "Borba" and "Omladinska borba". Was sentenced three times and spent five years in prisons.
- Josip Debeljak (born 28 November 1902 in Orešje Humsko near Hum na Sutli) worked as a baker. He joined SKOJ in 1920. From 1923 to 1925, he was first a member and then a president of the Union of Food Workers of Zagreb, member of the Central Administration of the Food Workers' Union of Yugoslavia and member of the Central Workers' Trade Union Committee of Yugoslavia. In 1928, he became a provincial secretary of the SKOJ for Croatia, and then in November 1928, at the Fourth Congress of the KPJ (in Dresden), he was elected member of the Central Committee of the KPJ. From then until 1930, he studied in Moscow, and after returning to Yugoslavia in 1930, he was elected a political secretary of the Central Committee of the SKOJ.
- Pero Popović Aga (born 28 January 1905 in Užice) was a shoemaker. From 1922 to 1924, he was a member of the SKOJ cell in Belgrade. From October 1924 to September 1928, he studied at the Sverdlov Communist University in Moscow. After returning to Yugoslavia, he became an organizational secretary of the Central Committee of the SKOJ.
- Josip Kolumbo (born 11 November 1905 in Kutjevo) was a tinsmith. He joined SKOJ in 1922 while working in Zagreb. From 1923, he worked at the Niš railway station where he led worker strikes and demonstrations. There, he became a member and later a secretary of the regional committee of the SKOJ and regional committee of the KPJ. From October 1928 to January 1930, he studied in Moscow. After returning to Yugoslavia and since Mišić, Oreški and Marganović were already dead, Kolumbo was named a secretary of the Central Committee of the SKOJ.

== Other contemporaneous secretaries ==
The Central Committee of the SKOJ had several more secretaries besides the famous "Seven Secretaries" during the interwar period. These individuals played vital roles, particularly during the organization's underground phases, though some met tragic ends due to political purges or accidents.

- Dragoslav Gajović and Radomir Stojilović were the first secretaries, during the time SKOJ was a legal organization (1919-1921). They soon quit politics after the Obznana.
- Dragoljub "Dragi" Milovanović served as the first underground secretary (1921–1922). He died in 1922 after accidentally falling from a cliff while on a secret mission for the SKOJ. He was then replaced by Čeda Kuzmić.
- Rajko Jovanović was elected secretary of the Central Committee together with Milovanović, but was dismissed in 1928 during the factional struggle within the KPJ. Jovanović later participated in the People's Liberation War before being killed in 1942.
- Nikola Kotur was elected political secretary of the SKOJ, but was expelled from SKOJ and KPJ in 1928. He emigrated to the Soviet Union and was reinstated to the membership of KPJ in 1935. He was arrested in 1937 during the Great Purge and executed in 1938.
- Grgur Vujović was the organizational secretary of the SKOJ's Central Committee. After serving a year in prison, he emigrated to the Soviet Union where he was KPJ representative in the Comintern. He was arrested during the Great Purge and disappeared, probably killed.
- Matija Brezović became the secretary of the SKOJ's Central Committee in 1927. He was arrested in 1929 and cooperated with the police, giving them the names of the communists. The police sent him to the Soviet Union to spy on Yugoslavian communists, but he was arrested there and executed in 1930.
- Mića Arsenijević, Boris Kidrič, Ivo Lola Ribar, Ratko Dugonjić and Milijan Neoričić were also secretaries of the Central Committee of the SKOJ, and went on to become prominent figures, particularly during and after World War II.

== Deaths ==
In the spring of 1929, Marganović was living clandestinely under a false identity in a small room in the backyard of a house in Zagreb. In April, Marganović was to meet Oreški and one other member of the SKOJ on a street in Zagreb to discuss the clandestine printing of some leaflets. But the police agents were following them, and before Oreški arrived, they approached and arrested Marganović and the other man. Police were still unaware of who the arrested men were, but found some communist notes in Marganović's pocket. During the interrogation, Marganović was silent. After that, the police subjected him to brutal beatings for ten days, but could not even find out his true identity. They only found out that the man was Marganović in July, after some arrested communists had betrayed him. After that, the torture continued on a daily basis. On 31 July, two shots were heard from the prison, and Marganović's body fell from the window. According to the official records, he committed suicide by jumping from the hallway window while being taken to the interrogation.

In the meantime, Mijo Oreški and his wife Agata left Zagreb and moved to Samobor. He conducted secret meetings with other communists in a nearby forest. On 25 July 1929, Mišić and Slavko Oreški (Mijo's brother) came to the house where Mijo lived. On 27 July, policemen came to the house and climbed the stairs before the tenants noticed them. Police opened fire and immediately killed Slavko. Mijo and Mišić managed to respond with their guns. The police retreated but continued to monitor the house and shoot at the window. While Mišić was shooting at the police, Mijo and Agata were destroying compromising documents. Later, the two also joined the gunfight. Mijo and Mišić were killed by the police fire, while Agata was wounded but survived.

Popović and Kolumbo met secretly on 14 August 1930 on the Zelengaj street in Zagreb, but police agents noticed them and called for reinforcement. A large group of policemen encircled the place where the two secretaries were meeting. When they came toward one of the policemen, he opened fire and called them to surrender. They refused and resisted. Kolumbo was immediately shot and killed, but Popović took a gun and opened fire at the police. Policemen were surprised, so Popović managed to escape to the house of writer August Cesarec, which was a secret meeting place for the communist activists. But, one neighbor noticed him and called the police. When Popović saw policemen approaching, he ran towards the nearby forest. Police shot him, he fell and then died the next day, without regaining consciousness.

Šnajder was the sixth of the Seven to die. When the dictatorship was proclaimed, he had already been imprisoned in Belgrade's Glavnjača prison since 1926. In 1927, Oreški organized Šnajder's unsuccessful escape during the court hearing. After that, Šnajder was taken back to the prison and chained. Soon, he was moved to the notorious Ada Ciganlija prison, where he was routinely tortured. In 1928, Šnajder and another communist prisoner started a hunger strike in protest against the treatment. He was then moved to the Zenica prison and put in solitary confinement. There, his health deteriorated, so in February 1931, he was moved to the prison hospital of the Lepoglava prison. Šnajder was released from prison in May, but he was already in such a condition that he was taken directly to the Zagreb hospital, where he died on 14 August, officially from abdominal tuberculosis.

The last to die was Debeljak. After returning to Yugoslavia in 1930, he lived clandestinely in Zagreb under a false identity. In September 1931, during a meeting with another communist in a café, police raided and tried to arrest him, but Debeljak returned fire, killed one policeman and managed to escape. Debeljak's comrade was wounded and arrested. Debeljak was wounded in the gunfight. After that, police intensified search for him, as Debeljak moved from one place to another. Finally, on 15 October, police agents tracked him down while he was hiding in the house of his comrade Josip Adamić's sister. He opened the fire on the police and was killed in the ensuing gunfight. Adamić was killed the same day while resisting the arrest.

== Legacy ==
On 30 May 1950, the remains of all Seven Secretaries were reburied, together with six other communist leaders, in the Tomb of the People's Heroes at Zagreb's Mirogoj Cemetery. During the communist period in Yugoslavia, the Seven Secretaries were glorified as heroes of the revolution and an example for young people to follow. In 1981, TV Beograd broadcast a television mini-series "Seven Secretaries of the SKOJ". Many streets, schools, military barracks and other institutions were named "Seven Secretaries of the SKOJ". Many of those were later renamed due to decommunization. "Sedam sekretara SKOJ-a" Elementary School in New Belgrade was renamed "Laza Kostić" in 2005. As of 2025, there are seven streets in Serbia still named "Sedam sekretara SKOJ-a".

In Communist Yugoslavia, "Seven Secretaries of the SKOJ" was also the name of a prestigious award awarded to young people for achievements in arts, literature, science and sports. It was awarded by the Zagreb's City Conference of the Socialist Youth League from 1965 to 1989.

== Gallery ==
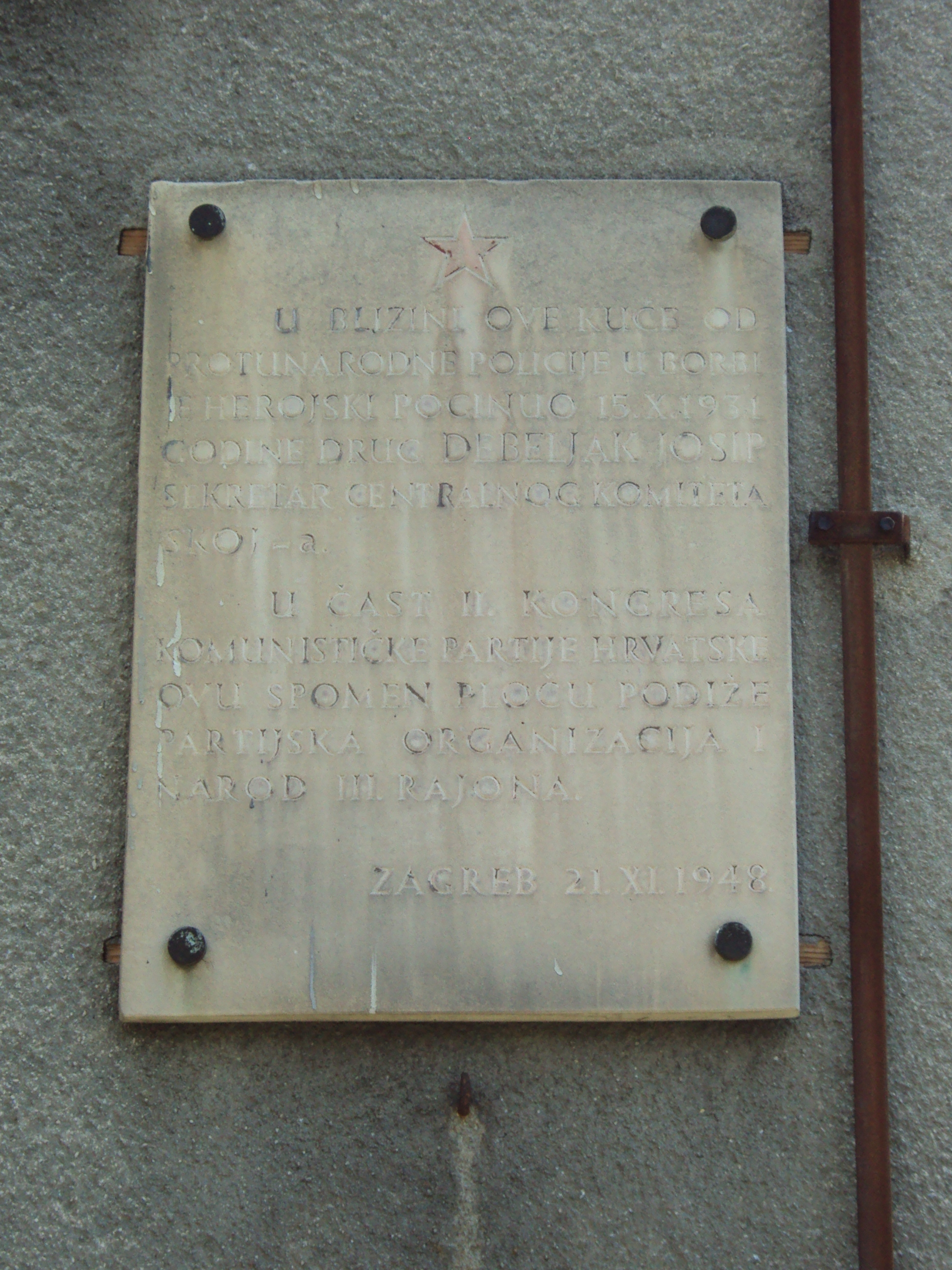
Memorial plaque on the house in Zagreb where Debeljak was killed by the police

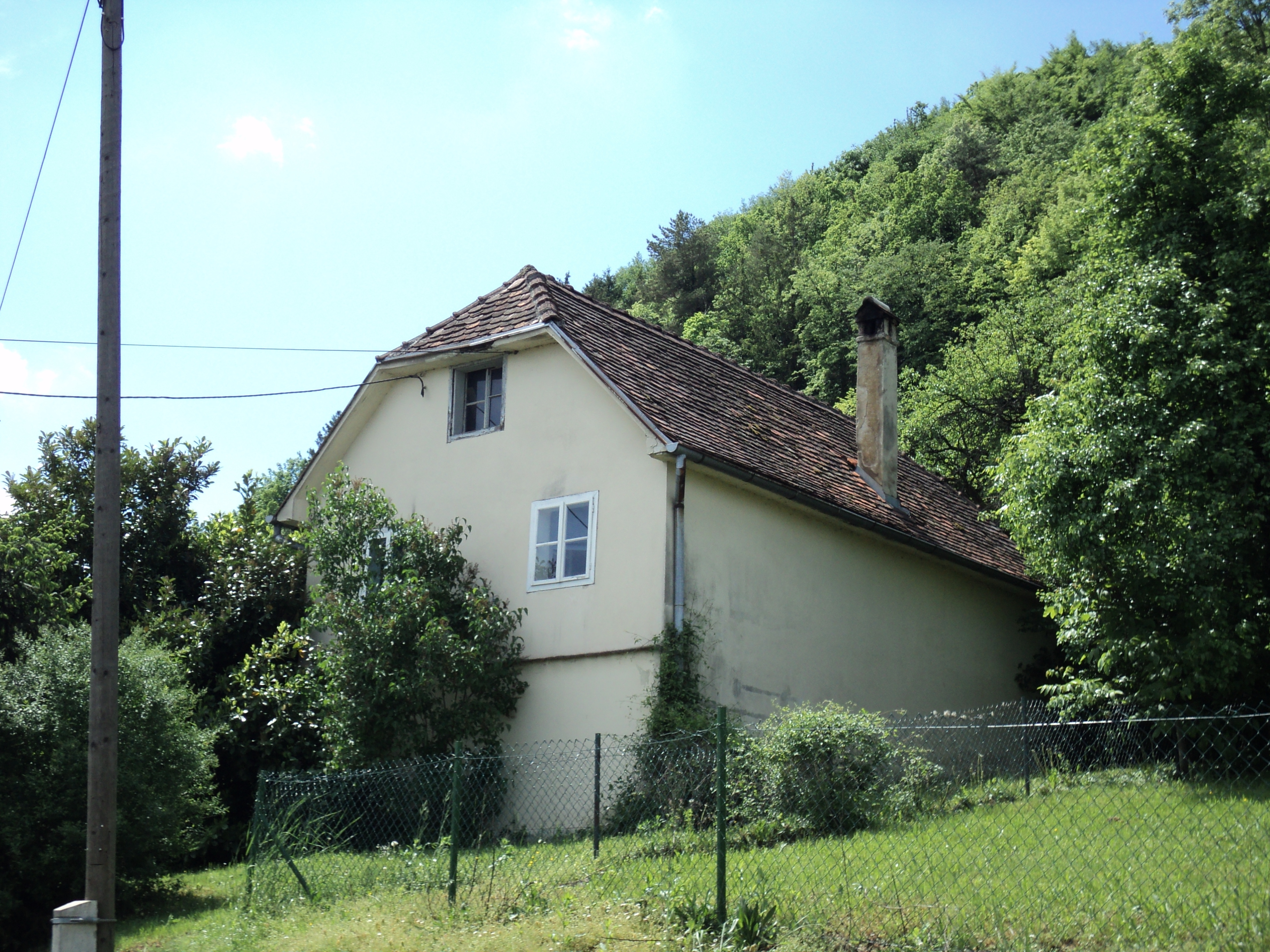
House in Samobor where Mišić and Oreški were killed

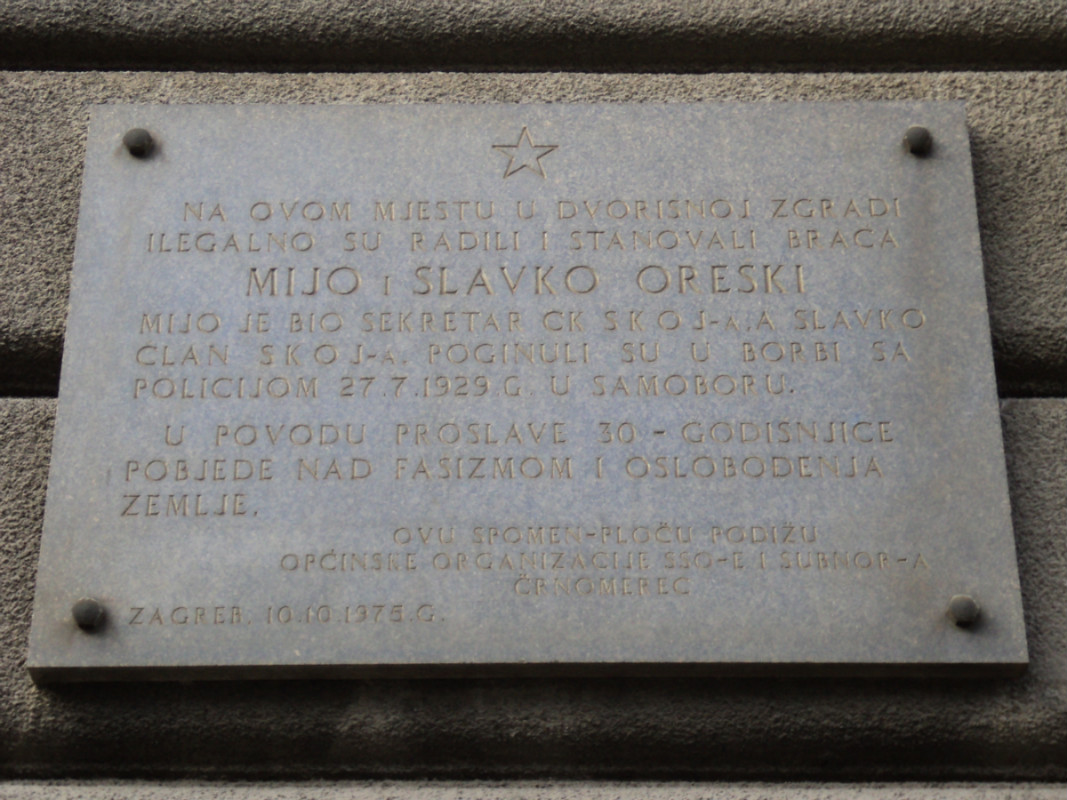
Plaque on a house in Zagreb's Ilica street where Oreški lived clandestinely before moving to Samobor

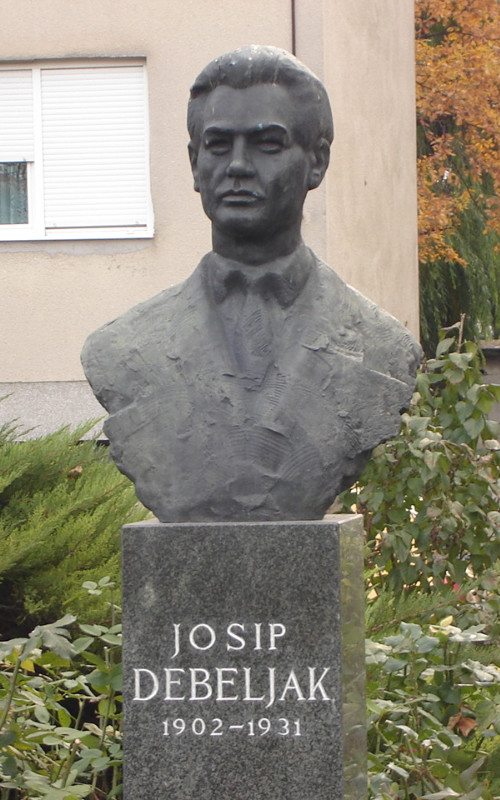
Bust of Josip Debeljak in Zagreb

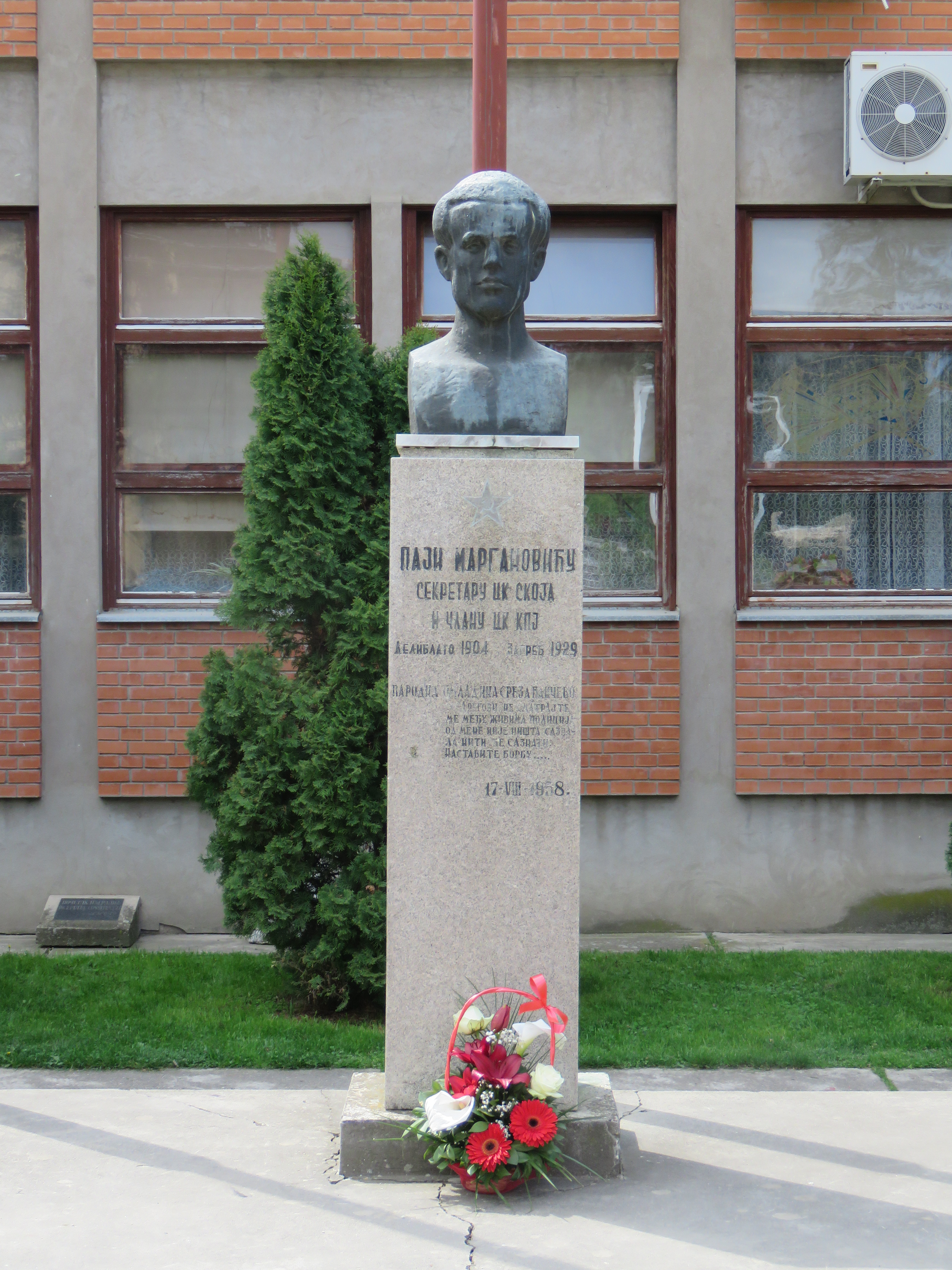
Bust of Paja Marganović in Deliblato
