= Jurica Ribar =

Serbian painter

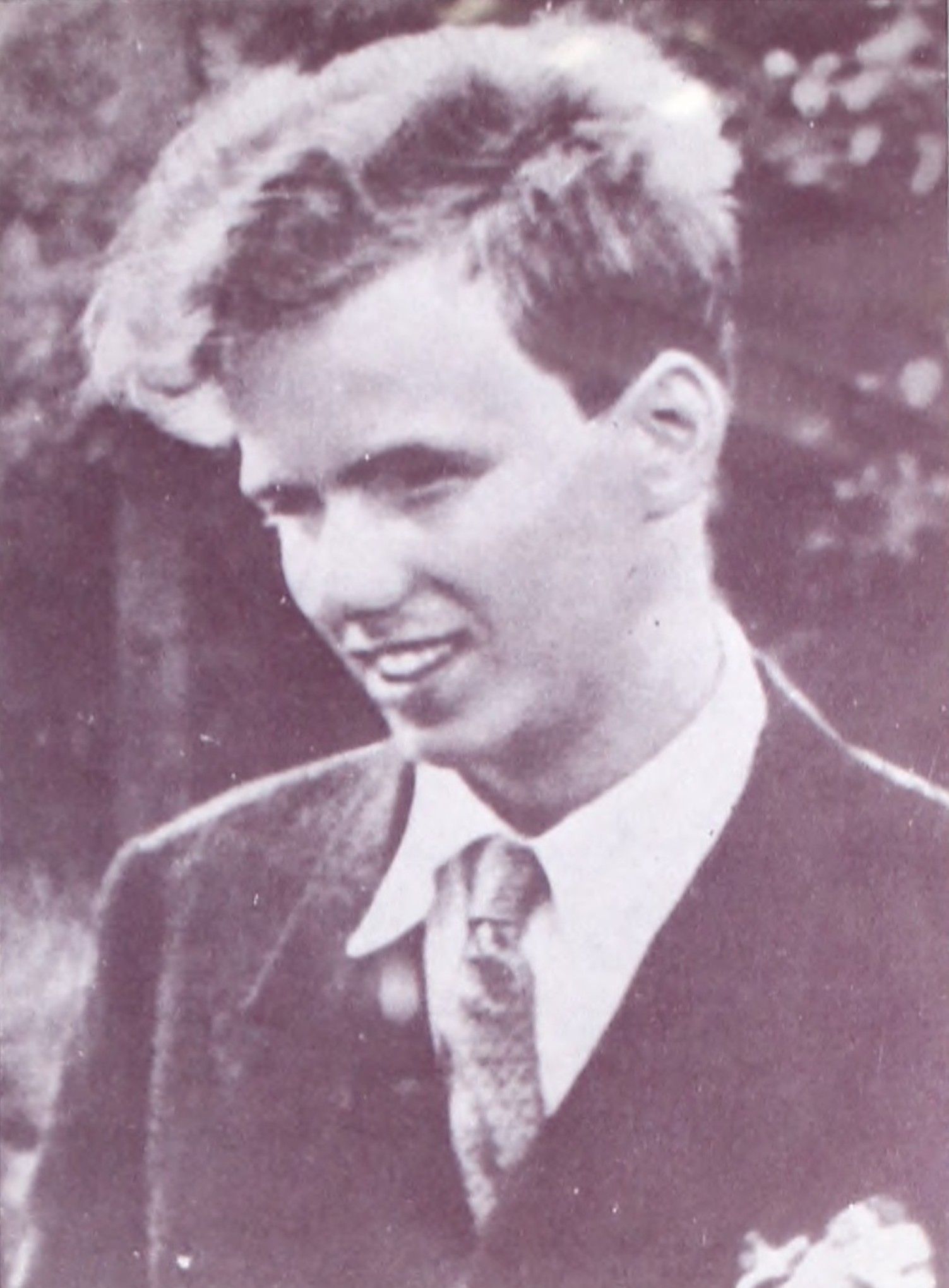
Jurica Ribar

Jurica Ribar (26 March 1918 – 3 October 1943) was a Yugoslav Croat painter.

== Biography ==
He was the younger son of the politician Ivan Ribar and brother of Communist Yugoslavia's hero Ivo Lola Ribar. Jurica grew up and was educated in Belgrade, where he finished elementary school and the Second Men's High School, and in March 1941 he graduated from the Faculty of Law. During his studies, he actively participated in a student political movement as a member of the illegal League of Communist Youth of Yugoslavia. He was actively involved in art, and mostly in painting. He attended the painting school with Jovan Bijelić, and in 1938 he became a member of the painting group "Ten", which consisted of many later famous painters, such as Ljubica Cuca Sokić, Aleksa Čelebonović, Nikola Graovac and others.

After the occupation, in 1941, he became a member of the League of Communists of Yugoslavia. Initially he was active in occupied Belgrade, and in the autumn he joined the Yugoslav Partisans. He took part in combat in major battles on Neretva and Sutjeska rivers. He was mortally wounded in early October 1943 while defending liberated Kolašin against Chetnik forces. He died later in a partisan hospital in the nearby village Trebaljevo and was interred there, but his remains were later moved to the Belgrade New Cemetery and interred with those of his mother, Antonija (Tonica) Ribar.

Jurica was due to be transferred to the partisan headquarters in Jajce, however the Chetnik attack prevented his transfer as all available manpower was needed to repel enemy forces. His brother, Ivo Lolo, hid news of his death from their father Ivan, putting instead his feelings in a letter addressed to his father and handing it over to Josip Broz Tito. In the letter he expressed survivor's guilt stating that he wished it was he who died instead of Jurica. Three days later, while departing with the Yugoslav military mission to Cairo, Ivo Lolo was killed as well. Thus, Tito had the unenviable task of informing Ivan Ribar of the deaths of both his sons.

After the war, Jurica's paintings were put on display in exhibitions organized by Cuca.

== Opus and group "Ten" ==
Jurica Ribar's painting activity lasted only seven years - from his first exhibition, after graduating from the painting school of Jovan Bijelić, in January 1934, to the beginning of World War II in Yugoslavia and his joining the Yugoslav Partisans in September 1941. He mainly worked on landscapes, figures, still lifes, portraits, flowers, terraces and parks. After a joint exhibition with Danica Antić, Nikola Graovac and Aleksa Čelebonović, Jurica continued to paint even more active and was especially interested in colour, and then his works Bokal with white flowers and blue background and Still Life with fish were created. His painting work was significantly influenced by visits to France, where he stayed during 1936, 1937 and 1938 with the painter Marko Čelebonović, the brother of his school friend Aleksa Čelebonović. His several-month stays in Saint Tropez and Paris significantly influenced the development of his painting talent, so he abandoned expressionism and began the search for a rich artistic expression in direct relation to nature. At that time, several works with motifs of landscapes from the south of France in completely green colour were created, among which are Landscapes from France and Hospitals in Saint Tropez. His "green phase", during which he relied on nature, was supported by a similar phase in which the painter Marko Celebonović was at the time. In his work, he later approached realism, and this phase lasted from 1937 to 1941, during which he painted in his small Belgrade studio in a kindergarten on the Danube.

In 1938, he was one of the founders of the painting group "Ten", which included other young painters - Ljubica Cuca Sokić, Danica Antić, Bogdan Šuput, Stojan Trumić, Aleksa Čelebonović, Nikola Graovac, Dusan Vlajić, Bora Grujić. and Milivoj Nikolajević. Although heterogeneous in their composition, there were academic painters with a university education, but also painters by vocation, who belonged to various social strata from the working class, through the intelligentsia to the bourgeoisie. What this group had in common was that they were all painters and students of Jovan Bijelić. Some of the members of the group perished during the Second World War, while the survivors were significant artists in the post-war period. This group of painters exhibited together in February 1940, where Jurica exhibited nine of his works - two landscapes from France, five still lifes, one flower and a painting in the park. He also exhibited during 1939 at the Spring and Autumn Exhibitions in Belgrade. At the Spring Exhibition, he exhibited his works Landscape from France and Landscape from the Danube, and at the autumn exhibition, a large self-portrait called The Young Man with the Blue Ribbon.

Among the most significant works of Jurica Ribar, created from 1933 to 1941, are The Man with the Hard Collar, In the Tavern, Flowers in a Blue Vase, Flowers in a White Jug, Flowers, Still Life, Still Life with Fish, Still Life with Metronome, Landscape from Saint Tropez, Woman in front of a mirror, Still life, Landscape from Dedinje, Still life with a chicken, Hospital in Saint Tropez, Houses in Saint Tropez, Landscape from Saint Tropez, Garden in Saint Tropez, Sea in Saint Tropez, Composition I, Young man with blue ribbon (self-portrait), Portrait of a girl, Still life with an angel, Landscape from the Danube, Landscape from Petrovac na moru, Terrace in Petrovac na moru, Composition II, From the workshop, In the park, and Landscape from Bileća.
