= Tomb of the People's Heroes, Zagreb =

Monument

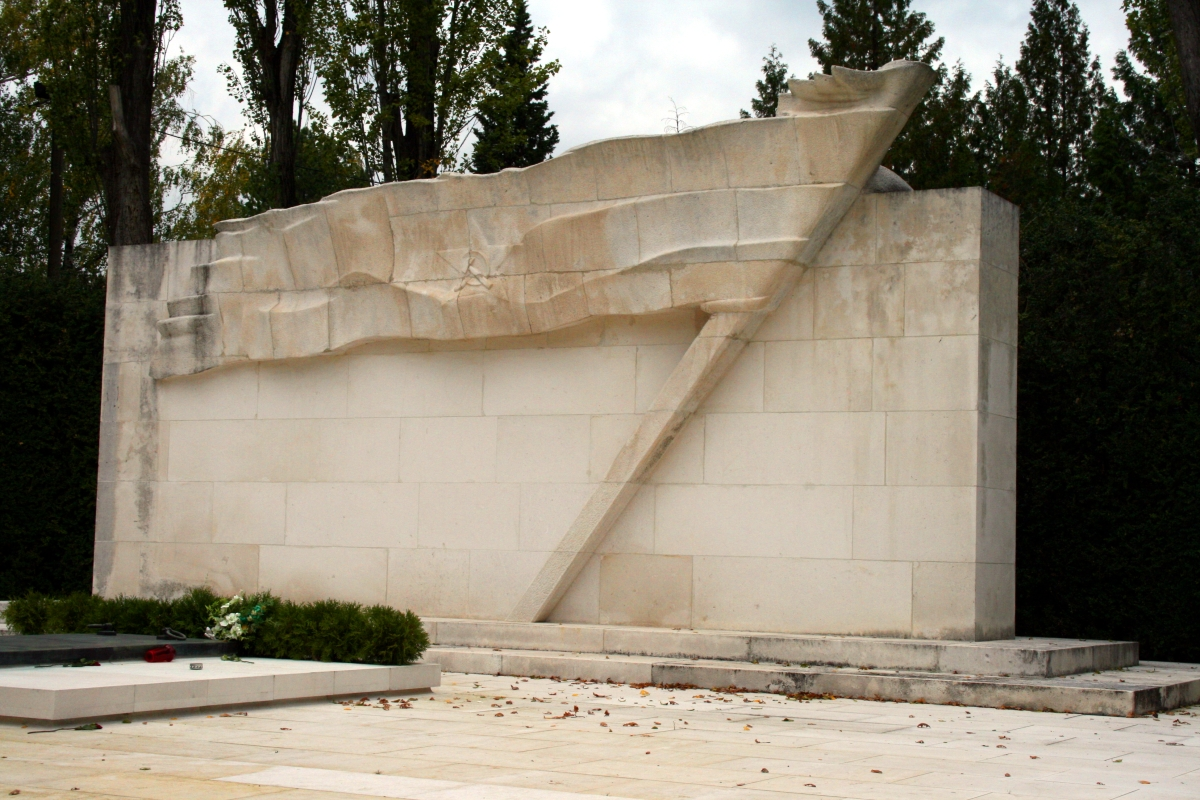
Tomb of the People's Heroes.

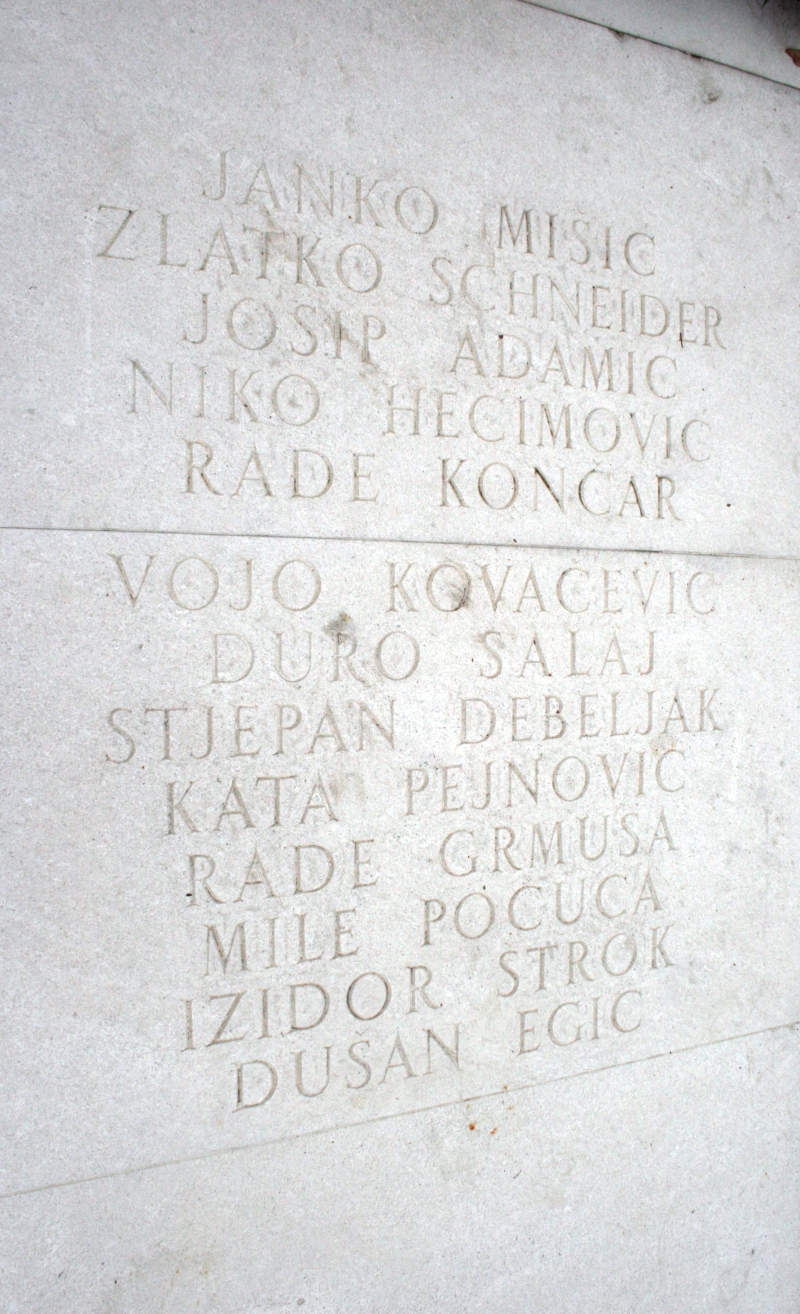
Right panel.

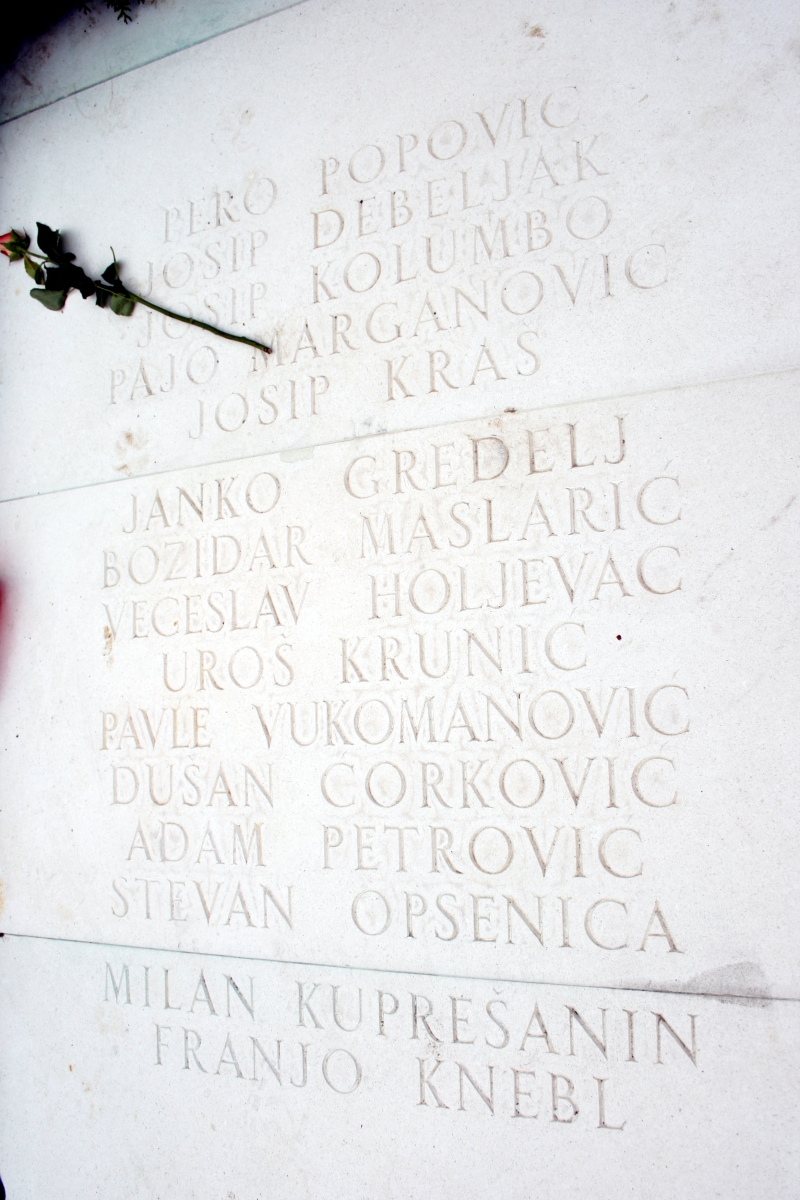
Left panel.

The Tomb of the People's Heroes (Croatian: Grobnica narodnih heroja) is located in Zagreb's central graveyard, Mirogoj. It was designed by the Croatian sculptor Đuro Kavurić and built in 1968. Buried in the tomb are not only the recipients of the Order of the People's Hero, but also some of the most notable workers' movement activists of Croatia and Yugoslavia.

During the night of February 1, 2001, unknown group of vandals activated an explosive in front of the Tomb, which caused serious damage. Some Croatian officials strongly opposed this act of vandalism. The damage has been repaired.

== List of people buried in the tomb ==
Names written on the right panel

- Janko Mišić (1900–1929), secretary of the Central committee of SKOJ
- Zlatko Šnajder (1903–1931), secretary of the Central committee of SKOJ
- Josip Adamić (1907–1931), member of the Local committee of the Communist Party of Yugoslavia (CPY) Zagreb and the secretary of the Regional committee of SKOJ for Croatia
- Nikola Hećimović (1900–1929), secretary of the "International Red Aid"
- Rade Končar (1911–1942), First secretary of the CC of the Communist party of Croatia (CPC), commander of the Operational party council for Croatia and People's Hero of Yugoslavia
- Vojin Kovačević (1913–1941), member of the Bureau of the Local committee of the CPC for Zagreb and People's Hero
- Đuro Salaj (1889–1958), president of the Unions Alliance of Yugoslavia
- Stjepan Debeljak (1908–1968), politician and People's Hero
- Kata Pejnović (1899–1966), politician and People's Hero
- Rade Grmuša (1907–1975), major general of Yugoslav People's Army (JNA) and People's Hero
- Mile Počuča (1899–1980), politician and People's Hero
- Izidor Štrok (1911–1984), general of the JNA and People's Hero
- Dušan Egić (1916–1985), lieutenant general of the JNA and People's Hero
- Dinko Šurkalo (1920–2010), admiral of the Yugoslav Navy and People's Hero
- Slavko Komar (1918–2012), politician and People's Hero
- Rade Bulat (1920–2013), general of the JNA and People's Hero

Names written on the left panel

- Pero Popović Aga (1905–1930), secretary of the Central committee of SKOJ
- Josip Debeljak (1902–1931), secretary of the Central committee of SKOJ
- Josip Kolumbo (1905–1930), secretary of the Central committee of SKOJ
- Paja Marganović (1904–1929), secretary of the Central committee of SKOJ
- Josip Kraš (1900–1941), member of the CC of the CPC and the Central committee of the CPY, one of the organizers of the antifascist uprising in Karlovac and People's Hero
- Janko Gredelj (1916–1941), one of the organizers of the antifascist struggle in Zagreb and People's Hero
- Božidar Maslarić (1895–1963), politician and People's Hero
- Većeslav Holjevac (1917–1970), politician, mayor of Zagreb and People's Hero
- Uroš Krunić (1914–1973), major general of the JNA and People's Hero
- Pavle Vukomanović (1903–1977), lieutenant of the JNA and People's Hero
- Dušan Ćorković (1921–1980), colonel general of the JNA and People's Hero
- Adam Petrović (1913–1984), politician and People's Hero
- Stevan Opsenica (1913–2002), major general of the JNA and People's Hero
- Milan Kuprešanin (1911–2005), colonel general of the JNA and People's Hero
- Franjo Knebl (1915–2006), major general of the JNA and People's Hero
- Milutin Baltić (1920–2013), politician and People's Hero

== See also ==
- Tomb of the People's Heroes, Belgrade
- Tomb of the People's Heroes, Ljubljana
