= Ivan Ribar =

Croatian politician (1881–1968)

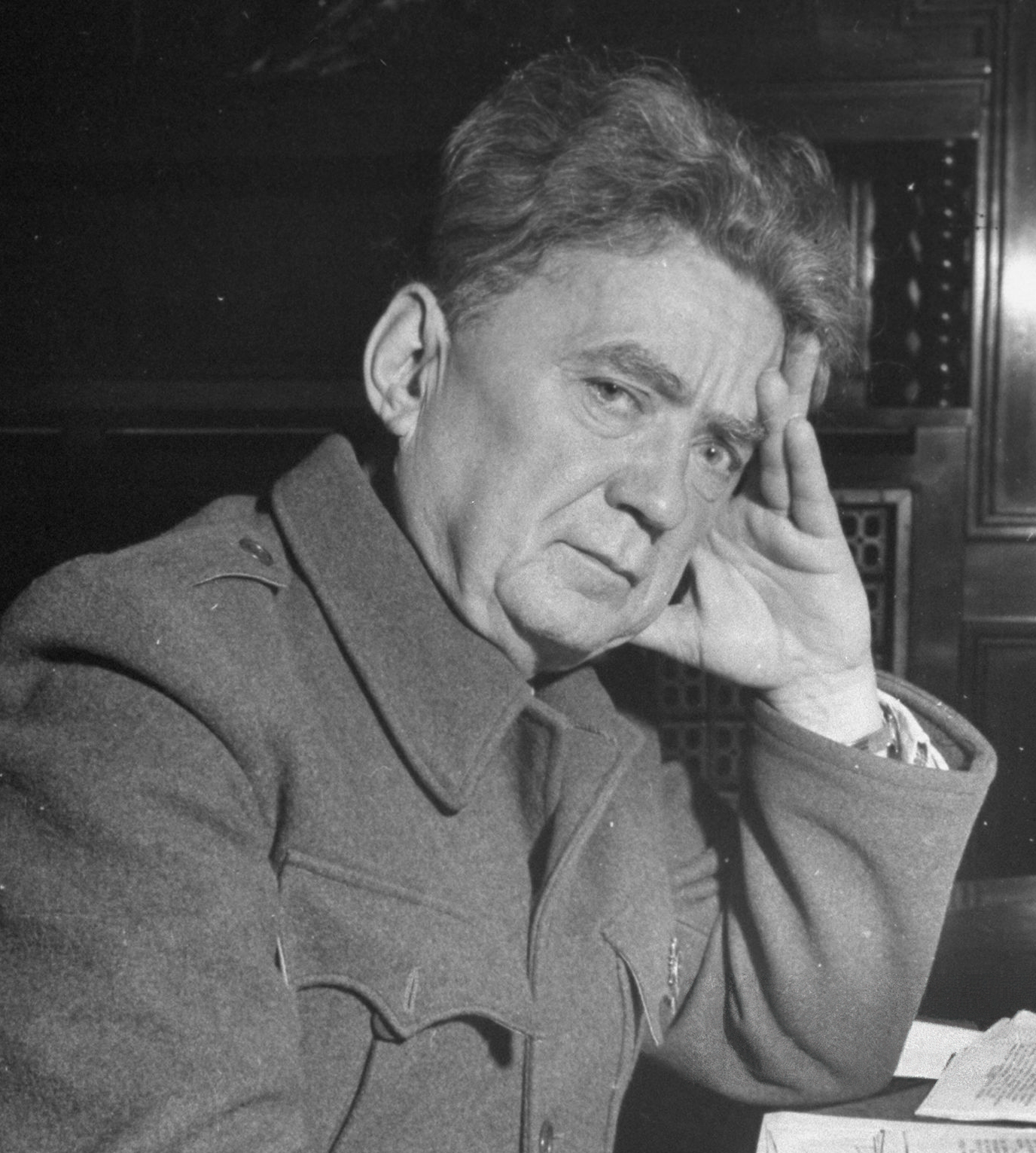
- Ribar in 1945

President of the Presidency of the National Assembly of Federal People's Republic of Yugoslavia
- In office 1 December 1945 – 14 January 1953
- Prime Minister: Josip Broz Tito
- Preceded by: Office established King Peter II (as King of Yugoslavia in exile)
- Succeeded by: Josip Broz Tito (Note: Between 1945–53, the President of the Presidency of the National Assembly was also the de jure head of state of Yugoslavia. From 14 January 1953 the office of parliamentary speaker was no longer head of state, but was succeeded in that role by the office of President of Yugoslavia which was first occupied by Josip Broz Tito, and held by him up to his death in 1980.) (as President of the Federal People's Republic of Yugoslavia)

President of the Presidency of the AVNOJ
- In office 29 November 1943 – 29 November 1945
- Prime Minister: Josef Broz Tito
- Preceded by: Office established
- Succeeded by: Office dissolved

1st President of the Constituent Assembly of Kingdom of Serbs, Croats and Slovenes
- In office 12 December 1920 – 19 October 1922
- Prime Minister: Ljubomir Davidović
- Preceded by: Office established
- Succeeded by: Ljubomir Jovanović

Personal details
- Born: 21 January 1881 Vukmanić, Croatia-Slavonia, Austria-Hungary
- Died: 2 February 1968 (aged 87) Zagreb, SR Croatia, SFR Yugoslavia
- Citizenship: Yugoslav
- Party: SKJ (1942–1968); DS (1919–1929); HSK (1905–1918)
- Profession: Lawyer and politician

Ivan Ribar (Serbian Cyrillic: Иван Рибар, pronounced [ǐvan rîbaːr]; 21 January 1881 – 2 February 1968) was a Croatian politician who served in several governments of various forms in Yugoslavia. Ideologically a Yugoslavist and communist, he was a prominent member of the Yugoslav Partisans, the resistance movement to the Nazi occupation of Yugoslavia.

== Biography ==
Ribar was born in Vukmanić (modern-day Karlovac, Croatia) and held a PhD in law. He worked as an attorney in Zagreb, Đakovo and Belgrade.

Ribar lost his entire family during World War II: his two sons, Ivo "Lola" and Jurica, and his wife Antonija. Both Ivo and Jurica were killed in action in 1943 fighting for the Partisans, while Ribar's wife was executed by the Germans in 1944. Ivo, his older son, was in charge of the League of Communist Youth of Yugoslavia (SKOJ) during the war, and was proclaimed posthumously a People's Hero of Yugoslavia.

=== Politics ===
In politics, he was: President of the Parliamentary Assembly of Kingdom of Serbs, Croats and Slovenes (1920–22) President of Executive Committee, Anti-Fascist Council for the National Liberation of Yugoslavia (26 October 1942 – 4 December 1943), President of the Presidency of the Provisional People's Assembly (4 December 1943 – 5 March 1945), President of the Presidency of the National Assembly (1 December 1945 – 14 January 1953)

From the proclamation of a republic in 1945 until 1953, Ribar was the de jure head of state of Yugoslavia; his position as parliamentary speaker having been made constitutionally equivalent to that of a state president. In 1953, Communist Party leader and Prime Minister Josip Broz Tito, the country's de facto leader since 1945, was elected to the new post of President of the Republic, while the Presidency of the National Assembly was permanently dissolved.

=== Second marriage and death ===
Ribar spent his last years in Zagreb. In 1952, he married painter and poet Cata Dujšin-Ribar and moved into her flat on 3 Demeter Street. He died in 1968, aged 87. In 1976, his widow donated their flat and their art collection to the city of Zagreb. The art collection is exhibited at the Demeter Street flat, which is open to public. As of 2021, the flat is temporarily closed due to damage from the 2020 Zagreb earthquake.

== See also ==
- List of honorary citizens of Skopje

== Notes ==
Political offices
Preceded by King Peter II as King of Yugoslavia	Heads of state of Yugoslavia; 1945–1953	Succeeded by Josip Broz Tito as President of Yugoslavia
Preceded by Office established Milan Simović	President of the Assembly of Yugoslavia; 1920–1922; 1945–1953	Succeeded by Ljubomir Jovanović; Milovan Đilas
