= Pristina Archives =

Cultural heritage monument of Kosovo

- Arkivi i Prishtinës (Albanian)
- Interactive map of Pristina Archives
- Location: Pristina, Kosovo

History
- Built: 19th century

The Pristina Archives is a cultural heritage monument in Pristina, Kosovo.

== History and description ==
The Pristina Central Archives, formerly the Technical High School, is located in Pristina's main historical district. Though the exact date of construction is unknown, the style points to the late 19th century, particularly given the clean horizontal lines of the Neoclassical style used on its symmetrical façade, simply decorated pilasters and floor friezes. The roof of the three-story building (a basement and a ground and first floor) has three layers. Each floor is 460 square metres (5,000 ft^{2}) for a total area of 1,380 square metres (14,900 ft^{2}), and some of the façades are decorated with little beyond paint. Under the Ottoman Empire, the property housed a pasha and later served as a prison. After World War II, from 1947 to 1951, it hosted a vocational school, followed by a stint until 1957 as a dormitory for students of Ivo Lola Ribar Gymnasium. Refugees from Croatia and Bosnia lived there during the years of direct Yugoslav control. After the Kosovo War, the OSCE funded repairs and the building came back into use for the local vocational school from 2002 to 2003. In 2004, the Municipal Assembly of Pristina decided to host its archives there, despite concerns about its suitability for the purpose.
