= Rade Bulat =

20th century communist partisan in Yugoslavia

Lieutenant colonel general Rade Bulat
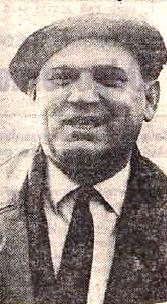
- Bulat in 1967
- Born: 28 August 1920; Vrginmost, Kingdom of Serbs, Croats and Slovenes
- Died: 25 January 2013 (aged 92); Zagreb, Croatia
- Burial place: Tomb of the People's Heroes, Mirogoj Cemetery, Zagreb
- Military career
- Allegiance: (Socialist Federal Republic of Yugoslavia) SFR Yugoslavia
- Branch: Yugoslav People's Army
- Rank: Lieutenant colonel general
- Awards

Rade Bulat (28 August 1920 – 25 January 2013) was a Yugoslav Partisan and communist activist. He was one of the last three living recipients of the Order of the People's Hero in Croatia.

== Biography ==
Bulat was born August 28, 1920, in Vrginmost within the Kingdom of Serbs, Croats and Slovenes. He attended gymnasium in Sisak, Gradiška and Zagreb.

In 1936 he joined the Young Communist League of Yugoslavia and was accepted into the Communist Party of Yugoslavia in 1939. After the April War he joined the Yugoslav Partisans. In 1942 he joined the Headquarters of the People's Liberation Movement of Croatia. He led the 13th Proletarian Attack Brigade from late 1942 on. Bulat became commander of the 32nd Zagorje Division on June 6, 1944.

After the war he was a representative in the Parliament of the Socialist Republic of Croatia, and was a member of the Central Committee of the Communist Party of Croatia. He was awarded the Order of the People's Hero on July 24, 1953, along with his wife Milka Kufrin.

During the Croatian Spring in 1971, Bulat publicly called for a Serb autonomous region within SR Croatia.

He published a book about the 10th Zagreb Corps in 1985.

After vandalism of a memorial grave in Lasinja in 2010, Bulat called for the perpetrators to be beaten by whoever found them.

In February 2011 it was revealed that Bulat had been subject of an ongoing investigation for war crimes by the Ministry of the Interior since 2007. The police investigation resulted in accusing him of ordering the killings of Croatian Home Guard war prisoners near Čazma on the night of November 28–29, 1943.
