= Pavle Marganović =

Yugoslav politician (1904–1929)

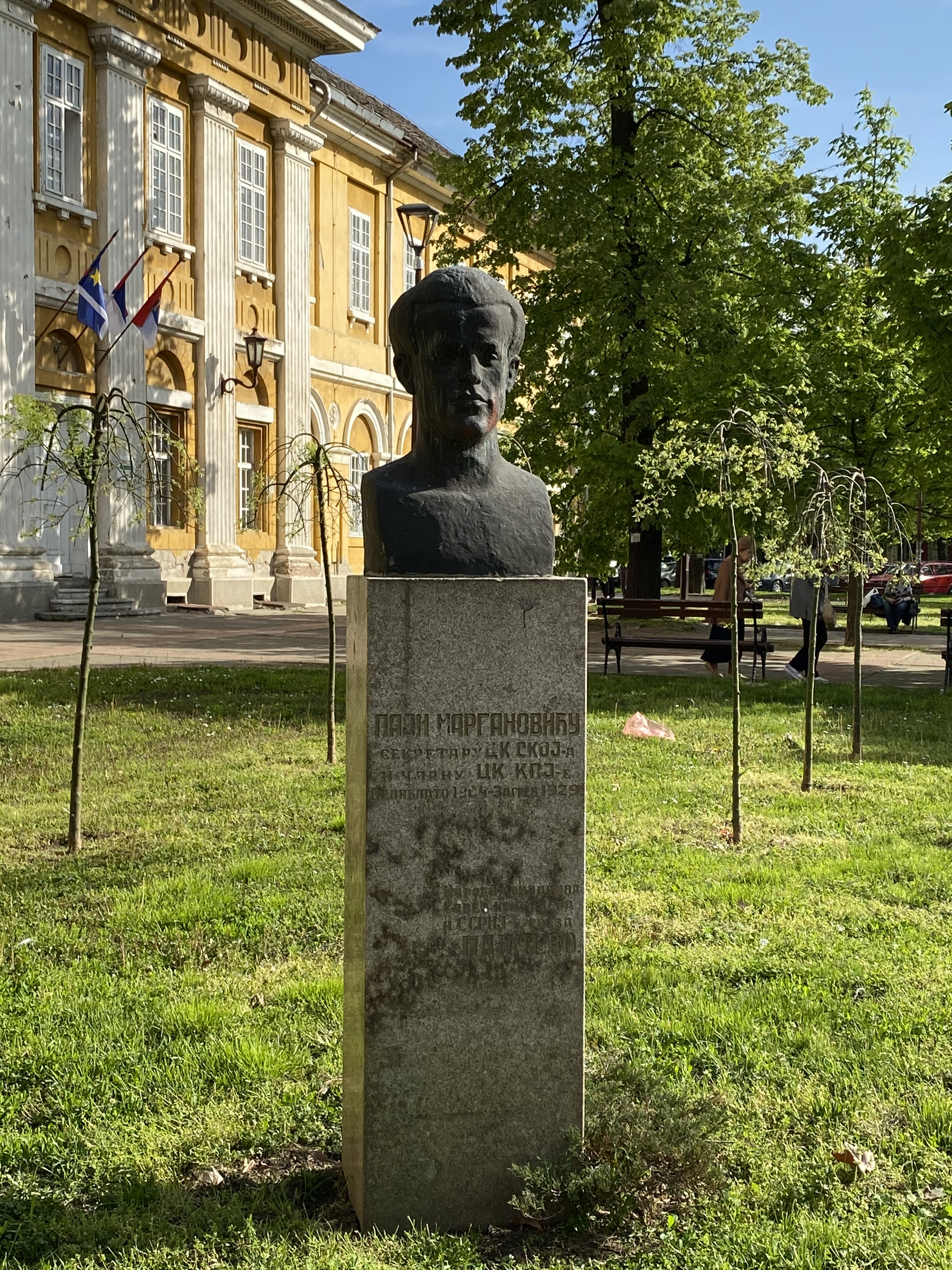
Bust of Pavle Marganović in Pančevo

Pavle "Paja" Marganović (17 March 1904 – 30 July 1929) was a Serbian communist activist and one of the Seven secretaries of SKOJ.

== Biography ==
He was born in Deliblato in 1904. He joined the labour movement in 1918, while working as a shoemaker's apprentice in Vršac and subsequently became the member of the Young Communist League of Yugoslavia in 1920. He then lived in Zagreb from 1921 until he started attending the Sverdlov Communist University in Moscow (1924–1928).

He was appointed as a member of the Central Committee of the Communist Party of Yugoslavia at the Fourth Congress of CPY in Dresden and became the secretary of the Central committee of the Young Communist League of Yugoslavia in 1928. He returned to Yugoslavia at the end of 1928.

Marganović was arrested by the Royal Yugoslav police in April 1929, in the midst of preparation for the annual Labour Day protest march. He was brutally tortured, questioned and eventually, murdered while in custody of the Zagreb police, on 30 July 1929.

After World War II, he was buried in the Tomb of the People's Heroes in Zagreb.

In communist Yugoslavia, Marganović was celebrated as one of the 'Seven secretaries of SKOJ', a group of seven communist youths killed in the Kingdom of Yugoslavia that were later immortalised by the new communist government.

== See also ==
- 6 January Dictatorship
