= Josip Adamić =

Yugoslavian communist

Josip Adamić (14 April 1907 – 15 October 1931) was a Yugoslav communist from Croatia. He joined the League of Communist Youth of Yugoslavia in 1926, and was killed by the police in 1931.

Adamić was born in Vezišće near Ivanić Grad. He joined the Communist Party at a time it had been banned in the Kingdom of Yugoslavia, and he was known as an organizer against the 6th January Dictatorship of 1929. He was killed as police agents found him in a Zagreb apartment while searching for party secretary Josip Debeljak.

== Bibliography ==
- Tito, Josip Broz (1980). Cengle, Franc; Strugar, Novak; Borozan, Đorđe (eds.). The Party of the Revolution: Fifth Conference of the Communist Party of Yugoslavia, 1940. Belgrade, SFR Yugoslavia: Socialist Thought and Practice.
- Flego, Višnja (1983). "ADAMIĆ, Josip". Croatian Biographical Lexicon (in Croatian).
