= Sloboda Trajković =

Sloboda Trajković (7 October 1918, in Vrnjci Spa – 9 May 1942, in Belgrade) was a National liberation fighter and Ivo Lola Ribar’s fiancée.

== Biography ==
She was born in 1918 when World War I ended in victory, when freedom triumphed she was named Sloboda (Freedom). The Trajković family consisted of the father, Svetolik, distinguished Belgrade apothecary, the mother, Milena, son, Miroslav, daughter, Milica, a pharmacy magistrate, Sloboda, a chemistry student and Vera. Sloboda was engaged to Ivo Lola Ribar. Trajković family were invited to dinner on 6 April 1941 into Ribar family home in order to plan a wedding. Since Belgrade was bombarded, neither the dinner nor the wedding happened because Ivo and Sloboda joined the National freedom fighting movement. Ivo became the youngest member of the Supreme headquarters of national freedom army. Sloboda’s father sent medicine, medical material and money to partisans. Her brother Miroslav was a connection for partisan actions in Belgrade, and Sloboda actively participated in National freedom movement. With her sister Vera she gathered clothes and the rest of needed supplies for partisans. When Lola joined the partisans, he wouldn’t let her go with him because he doubted that she would endure the hardships she would be subjected to due to her frail build, instead he insisted that she goes to her aunt in Vrnjci Spa where she could be protected. A letter sent from Lola to Sloboda was intercepted by the police in January 1941. This was the reason why the whole family was arrested on 14 January 1942 in Belgrade, except the eldest sister Milica, who moved to her flat shortly before the arrest and avoided it that way. Vera was tortured for 10 days before they realized she wasn’t Sloboda. Vrnjci Spa police arrested her and kept her there for 10 days before she was transferred to Glavinjača with the rest of her family. She was tortured for days. They requested that she wrote a letter to Lola, inviting him to Belgrade or they would kill her whole family. Since she didn’t want to betray Lola, Trajković family were transferred into a camp in Banjica where they were suffocated in gas chambers on 9 May in 1942.

== Lola's letter to Sloboda ==
Ivo Lola Ribar wrote a letter to Sloboda in January 1941.

== Sloboda in literature ==
The writer Nada Marinković published a romanticized biography of this heroine “Legend of Sloboda the maiden“ in 1980 (Belgrade: Narodna knjiga; Titograd: Pobjeda}. .

== Street ==
Sloboda Trajković street is located in Voždovac. Its length is 222 meters. In remembrance of Sloboda Trajković and the rest of her family members, a street in Belgrade settlement Banjica bears the name of Trajković family street.
