= Janko Gredelj =

Janko Gredelj (28 March 1916 – 23 December 1941) was a Yugoslav communist and one of the organizers of the antifascist struggle in Zagreb in 1941.

He was born in Zagreb in 1916. After finishing public school, he went on railway school. He also got the job there. In 1937, he became a member of the Young Communist League of Yugoslavia, and the next year a member of the Communist Party of Yugoslavia. After invasion of Yugoslavia by Axis powers in 1941, he was one of the organizers of the shock groups at the railway in Zagreb. He participated in a few diversions: attack at the Gestapo agents in Bukovačka street and theft of 60 rifles, 10,000 bullets and some hand grenades from Germans' wagons at the West railway station in Zagreb.

Gredelj was arrested by the Ustashe in the summer of 1941. He was tortured in prison, but said nothing. He was set free, since there was not enough evidences to prove his guilt. After that, he was appointed to work in illegal press cell of the Communist Party of Croatia in Klaićeva street. Ustasha agents discovered illegal press room on 23 December 1941, and tried to arrest Gredelj. He started shooting and tried to escape, but was mortally wounded. He was transported to Vinogradska street hospital where he soon died of wounds.

He was posthumously proclaimed a People's Hero of Yugoslavia in 1951.

A company TŽV Gredelj bears the name after him.
