= List of honorary citizens of Skopje =

This is a List of honorary citizens of Skopje North Macedonia. *

Name	Photo	Year of awarding
Ivan Ribar		7 May 1921
Josip Broz Tito		13 November 1946
Władysław Gomułka		16 November 1965
Józef Cyrankiewicz		16 November 1965
Olav V of Norway		7 September 1966
U Thant		30 August 1970
Mother Teresa		27 June 1980
Frenk Munning		26 July 1983
Umberto Vatani		17 October 2005
Sharik Tarа		30 November 2005
Christopher R. Hill		26 July 2008
Lawrence Eagleburger		26 July 2008
Thorvald Stoltenberg		26 July 2008
Werner Trini		26 July 2008
Filip Vujanović		5 March 2012
Richard Neuheisel		14 July 2012
