= Ivan Milutinović =

Yugoslav Partisan general (1901 – 1944)

- Иван Милутиновић
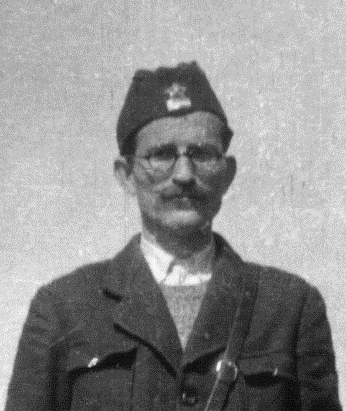
- Ivan Milutinović on April 1, 1942
- Born: 27 September 1901; Podgorica, Principality of Montenegro
- Died: 23 October 1944 (aged 43); Belgrade, DF Yugoslavia
- Military career
- Allegiance: Yugoslav Partisans
- Service years: 1941–1944
- Nickname: Milutin
- Conflicts: World War II in Yugoslavia: Uprising in Montenegro
- Awards: Order of the People's Hero; Hero of the People

Ivan Milutinović (nickname Milutin; Serbian Cyrillic: Иван Милутиновић; 27 September 1901 – 23 October 1944) was a Yugoslav Partisan general and an eminent military commander who participated in World War II.

== Before the war ==
In October 1940, during the Fifth Land Conference of the Communist Party of Yugoslavia held in Zagreb, Milutinović was elected as a member of Politburo. At this conference Tito formulated the leftist strategy of the CPY as focused on a revolutionary seizure of power in the country in order to organize a Soviet-style administrative organization in Yugoslavia. Besides Milovan Đilas and Boris Kidrič, Milutinović would become one of the major proponents of the policy of leftist errors pursued during the Second World War.

== Second World War ==
On 27 June 1941, Milutinović was elected as a member of the Supreme Staff of the National Liberation Partisan Units of Yugoslavia. During the Uprising in Montenegro, Chetnik commander Bajo Stanišić wanted to negotiate with the Partisans but Ivan Milutinović, as a commander of the Partisan forces in Montenegro, refused to reply to Stanišić's proposal. Milutinović had numerous exhausting polemics with Terence Atherton in futile attempts to convince him to change his positive view about Chetnik leader Draža Mihailović.

== Death ==
Ivan Milutinović died on 23 October 1944, when a small boat which was transporting him to Belgrade hit a naval mine in the Danube. He was decorated with the Order of the People's Hero and was proclaimed Hero of the People by Albania in 1947.

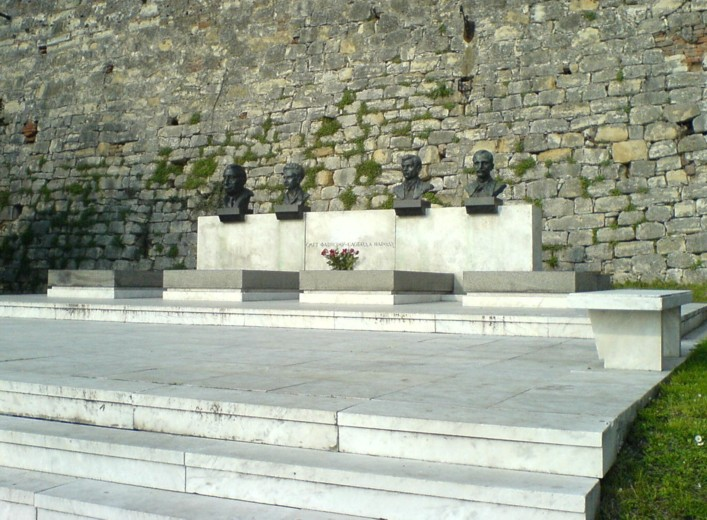
Tomb of the People's heroes

The remains of Ivan Milutinović were buried in the Tomb of People's Heroes in Belgrade, Republic of Serbia.

== Legacy ==
From 1949 until 1992 Berane was named as Ivangrad (Serbian: Иванград) in honour of Milutinović. Until 2006 the Square of the Republic in Podgorica was known as Ivan Milutinović Square. The leading company for waterways in former Yugoslavia and today in Serbia is PIM Ivan Milutinović. Many schools in SFRY carried Milutinović's name. Some schools in Serbia and Montenegro still do.

== Sources ==
- Banac, Ivo (1988). With Stalin Against Tito: Cominformist Splits in Yugoslav Communism. Cornell University Press. ISBN 0-8014-2186-1.
- Marković, Lazo (1970). Ivan Milutinović Milutin (in Serbian). Grafički zavod.
- Ramet, Sabrina P. (2006). The Three Yugoslavias: State-Building and Legitimation, 1918–2005. Bloomington, Indiana: Indiana University Press. ISBN 978-0-253-34656-8.
