= Tomb of People's Heroes, Belgrade =

Cultural monument in Serbia

Tomb of People's Heroes
- Гробница народних хероја Grobnica narodnih heroja
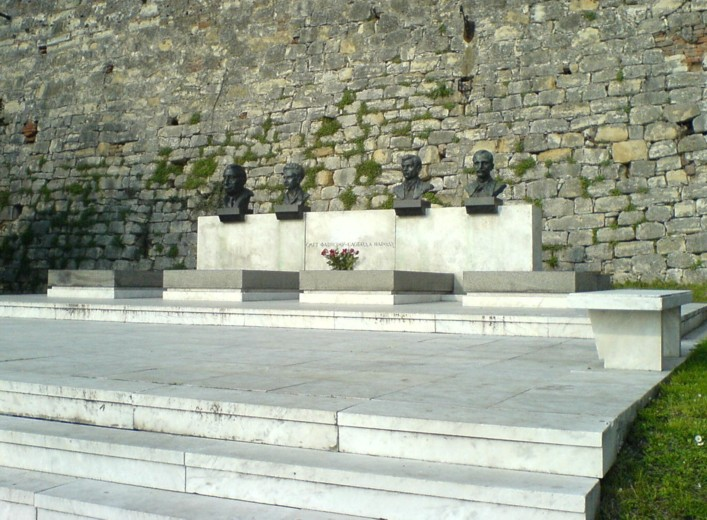
- Tomb of People's Heroes
- Interactive map of Tomb of People's Heroes
- Location: Belgrade, Serbia
- Coordinates: 44.82194°N 20.44891°E
- Designer: Stevan Bodnarov (sculptor); Slavoljub Stanković (sculptor)
- Type: Monument
- Opening date: 1948
- Dedicated to: Ivo Lola Ribar; Ivan Milutinović; Đuro Đaković; Moša Pijade

Tomb of People's Heroes (Serbian: Гробница народних хероја, romanized: Grobnica narodnih heroja) in Belgrade is located underneath the walls of the Belgrade Fortress. It holds the remains of four prominent Yugoslavian communists, three of whom participated in the World War II and were proclaimed the People's Heroes of Yugoslavia (Ivo Lola Ribar, Ivan Milutinović and Moša Pijade). The fourth, Đuro Đaković, was a prominent pre-war communist activist killed by the police in 1929.

The tomb was built in 1948. Remains of Ribar (1916–1943) and Milutinović (1901–1944) were buried there on 29 March 1948. Remains of Đaković (1886–1929) were buried on the 20th anniversary of his death on 29 April 1949. Pijade (1890–1957) was buried in the tomb in March 1957.

Stevan Bodnarov, a sculptor from Belgrade, designed the busts of Ivo Lola Ribar, Ivan Milutinović and Đuro Đaković in 1949. The bust of Moša Pijade, designed by Slavoljub Stanković, was added in 1959. The tomb was declared Monument of Culture by the City Assembly of Belgrade in 1983.

== Gallery ==
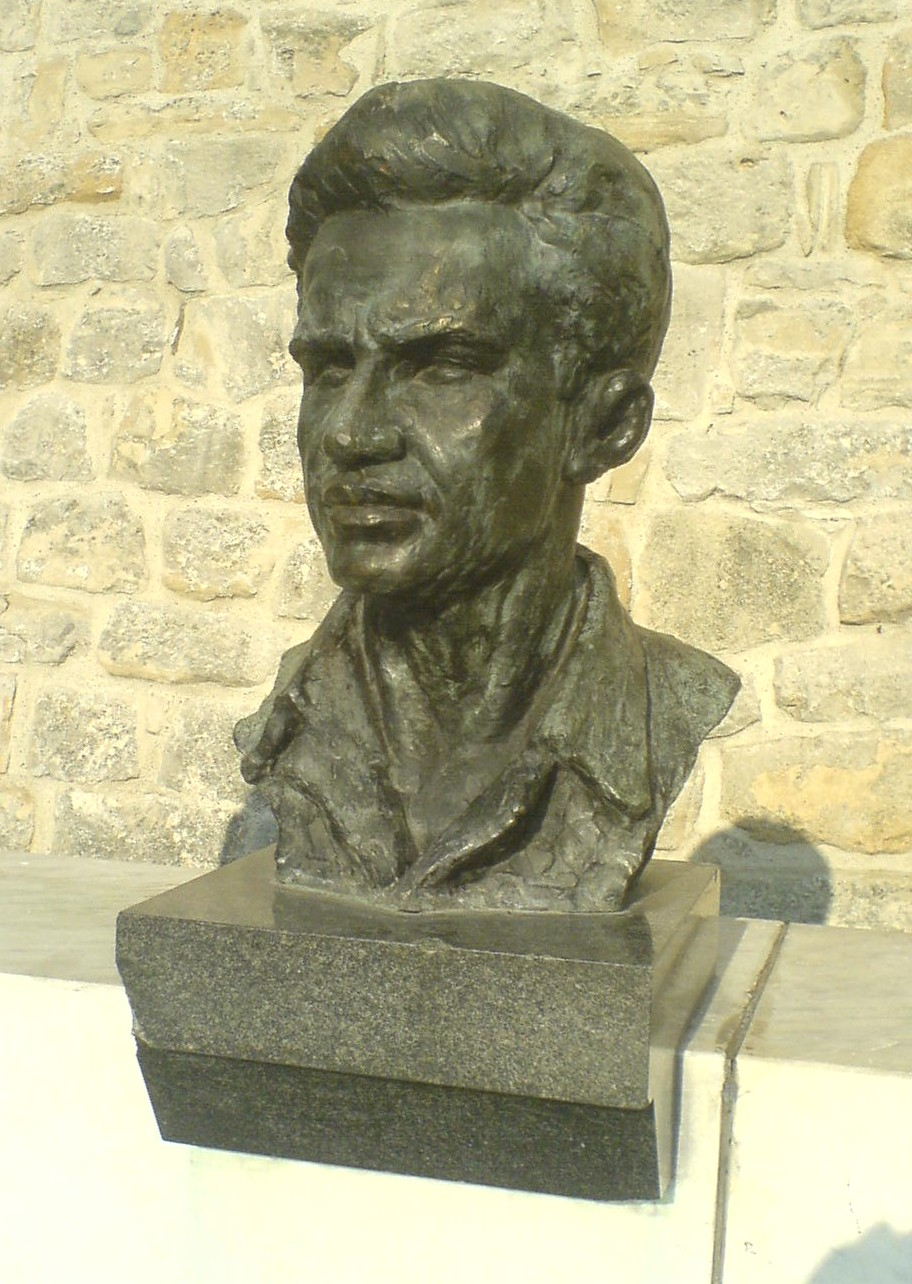
Bust of Ivo Lola Ribar.

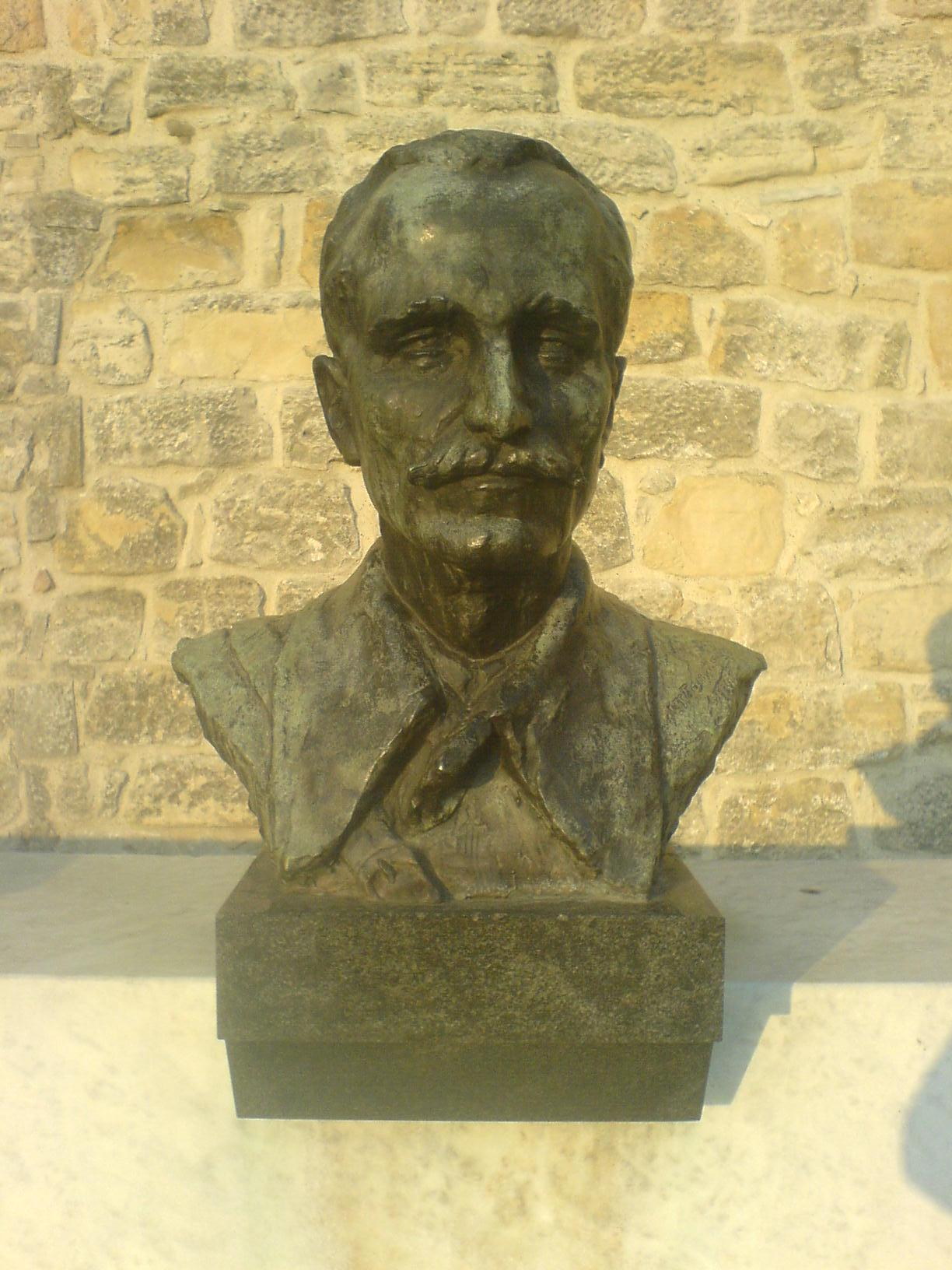
Bust of Ivan Milutinović.

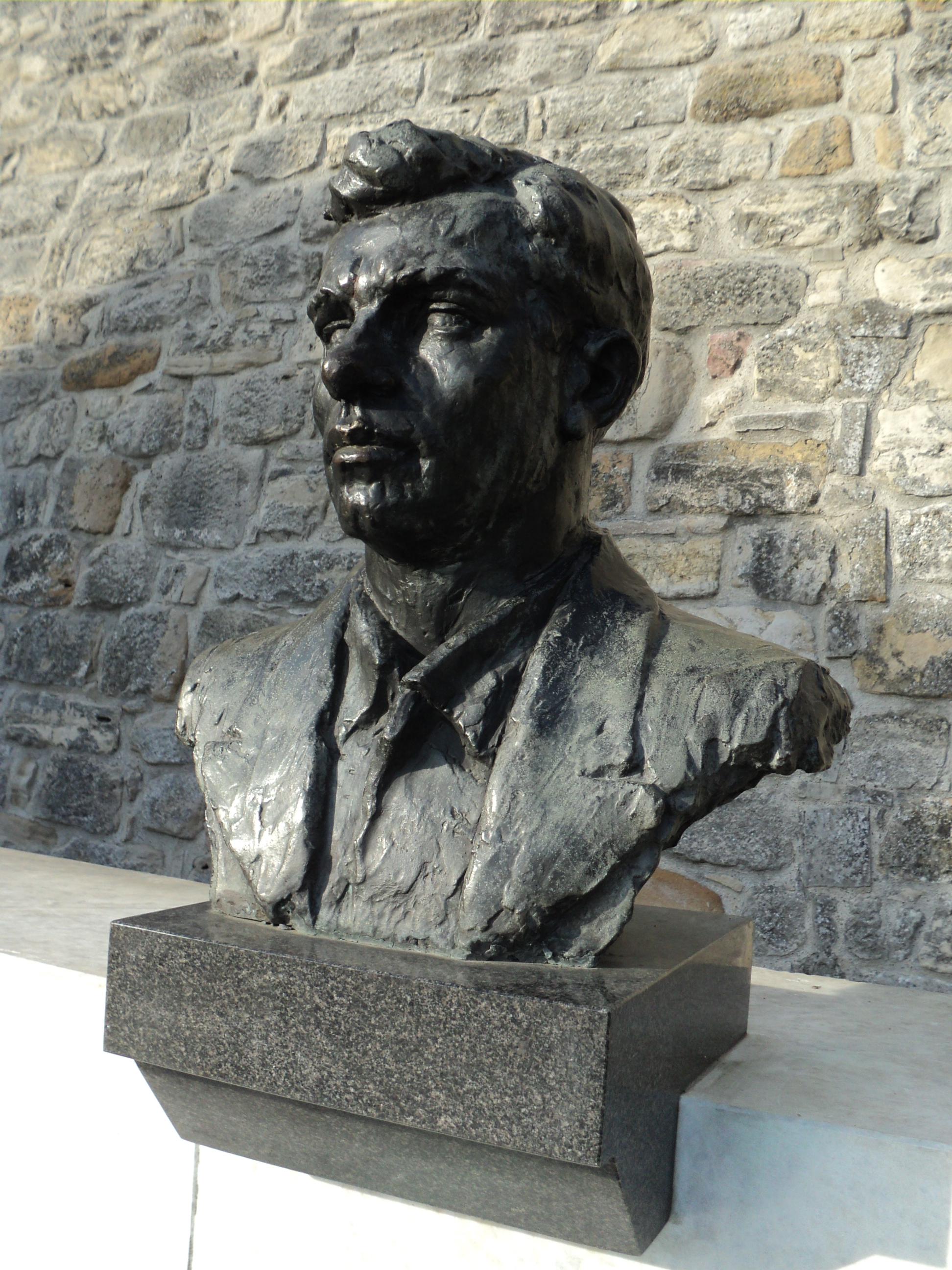
Bust of Đuro Đaković.

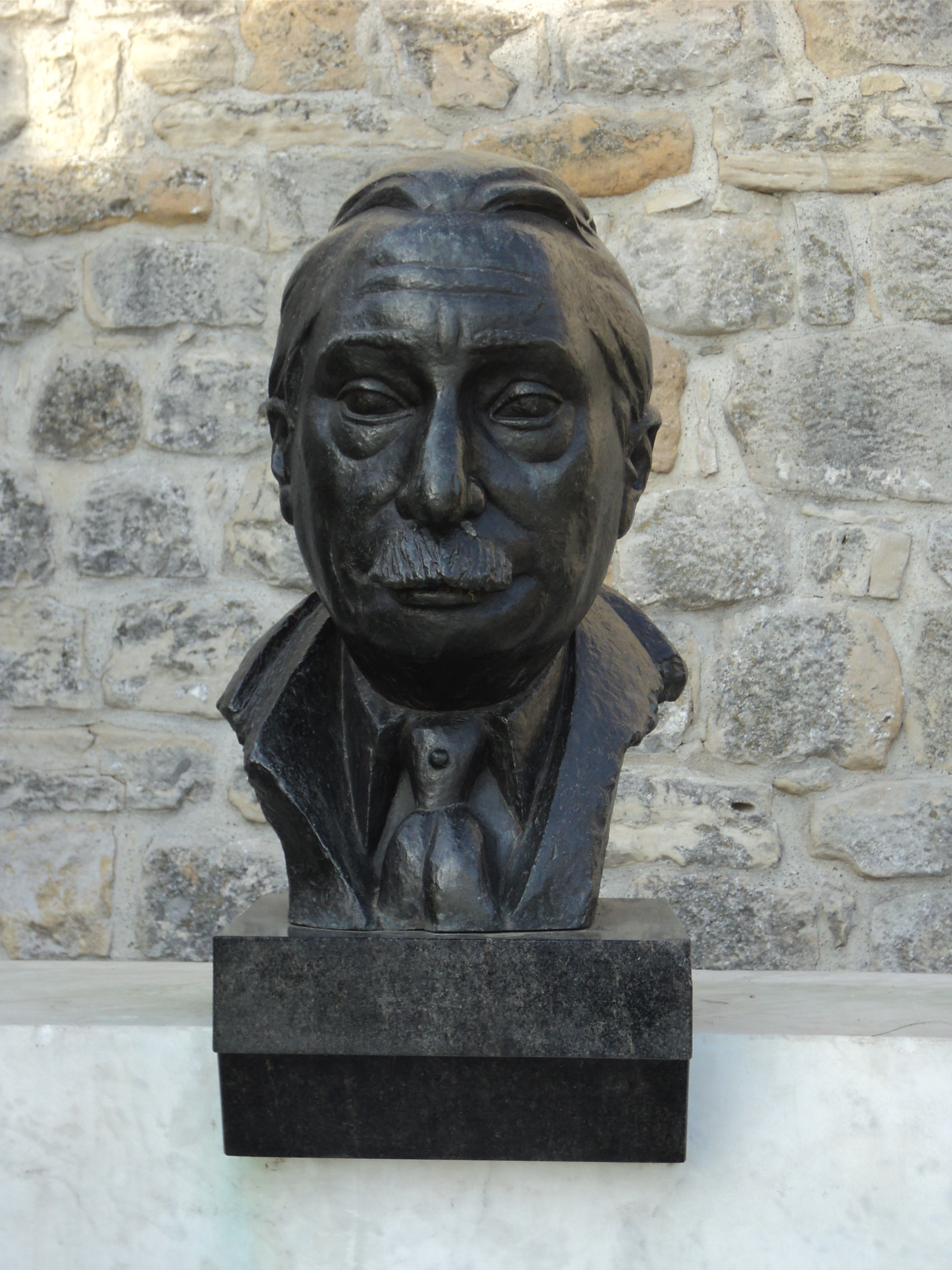
Bust of Moša Pijade.

== See also ==
- Tomb of the People's Heroes, Zagreb
- Tomb of National Heroes (Ljubljana)
