= Ivo Lola Ribar =

Yugoslav communist politician and military leader

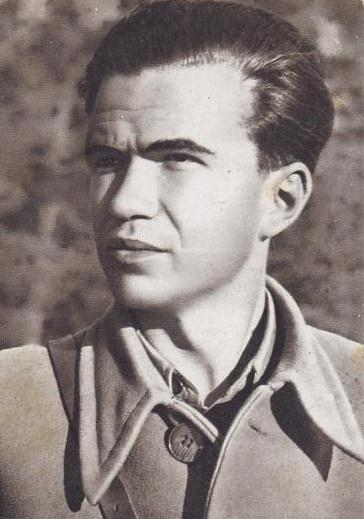
- Born: Ivan Ribar; 23 April 1916; Zagreb, Croatia-Slavonia, Austro-Hungary
- Died: 27 November 1943 (aged 27); Glamočko field near Glamoč, Independent State of Croatia
- Burial place: Tomb of People's Heroes, Belgrade, Serbia; 44.82194°N 20.44891°E
- Relatives: Ivan Ribar (father), Jurica Ribar (brother)
- Military career
- Allegiance: Yugoslav partisans
- Service years: 1941–1943
- Nickname: Ivo Lola
- Awards: People's Hero of Yugoslavia

Ivan Ribar (23 April 1916 – 27 November 1943), known as Ivo Lola or Ivo Lolo, was a Yugoslav Croat communist politician and military leader. In the 1930s, he became one of the closest associates of Josip Broz Tito, leader of the Yugoslav Communist Party. In 1936, Ribar became secretary of the Central Committee of SKOJ (Young Communist League of Yugoslavia). During World War II in Yugoslavia, Ribar was among the main leaders of the Yugoslav Partisans and was a member of the Partisan Supreme Headquarters. During the war, he founded and ran several leftist youth magazines. In 1942, Ribar was among the founders of the Unified League of Anti-Fascist Youth of Yugoslavia (USAOJ). He was killed by a German bomb in 1943 near Glamoč while boarding an airplane for Cairo, where he was to become the first representative of Communist Yugoslavia to the Middle East Command.

In 1944, Ribar was awarded the title of People's Hero of Yugoslavia. Lola was the older of two sons of Ivan Ribar, the first President of Yugoslavia. His brother was another People's Hero, Jurica Ribar.

== Life ==
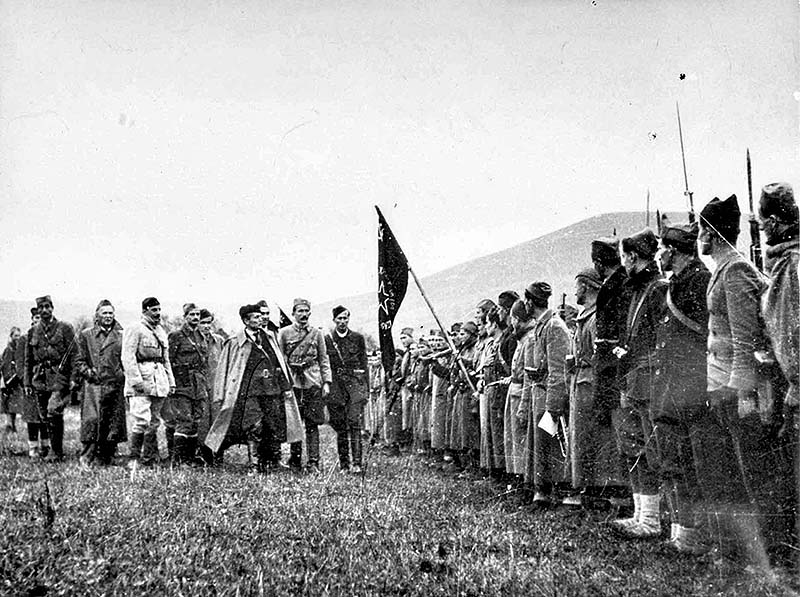
Josip Broz Tito inspects 1st Proletarian Brigade. Next to him are: Ivan Ribar, Koča Popović, Filip Kljajić, Ivo Lola Ribar, Danilo Lekić and Mijalko Todorović.

Ribar was born in Zagreb and lived most of his life in Belgrade, where he graduated from the University of Belgrade's Law School. During his studies he joined the Communist Party of Yugoslavia and starting in 1936 led the Young Communist League of Yugoslavia (SKOJ). During his studies, he often traveled around Europe, visiting communist conferences and informal gatherings in Brussels (1935), Geneva (1936) and Paris (1937).

In 1940, the Kingdom of Yugoslavia authorities incarcerated him in the Bihać Prison for being a member of the Communist Party. When the Second World War in Yugoslavia started, he was a member of the Central Committee of the Party and soon joined the Supreme Command of the Partisans, where he worked with Josip Broz Tito and Edvard Kardelj on the resistance plans.

In October 1943, Lola Ribar was named the chief of the first Partisan military mission to the Middle East Command. However, just before embarking on an airplane trip in a captured German plane to Cairo, he died in the German bombing of the Glamoč airfield in south-western Bosnia. Two members of the British Military Mission to Yugoslavia, William Deakin and Fitzroy Maclean, wrote about the circumstances of the death of Ribar and two British officers from an attack by a small German aircraft, and Maclean said that he was an outstanding younger leader who "seemed destined to play a great part in building the new Yugoslavia".

== Family ==
Ribar's father, Ivan Ribar, held important offices in both the pre-war Kingdom of Yugoslavia and the post-war Federative People's Republic of Yugoslavia. The rest of his family was also involved in Communist resistance movement. His younger brother Jurica died in around the same time in October 1943 near Kolašin. His mother Tonica was killed in the Syrmian village of Kupinovo in July 1944. Additionally, his fiancé, Sloboda Trajković, was also in the revolutionary movement. She was imprisoned and gassed to death in Banjica concentration camp together with all of her family, after refusing to write a letter that would get him to give up his location when his letter to her got intercepted.

== Legacy ==
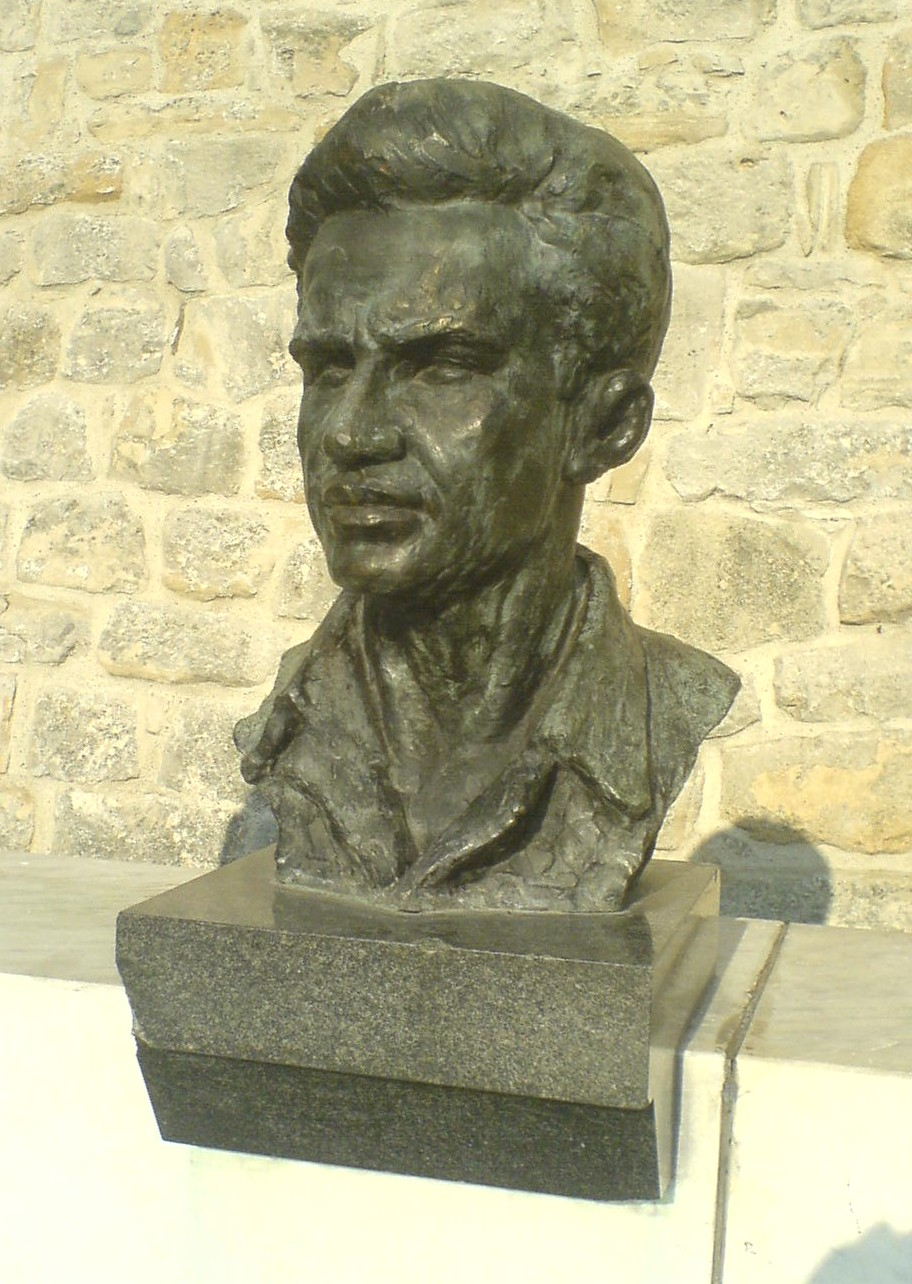
Bust of Ribar at his grave-site, Tomb of People's Heroes, Belgrade

After the death, Ribar was at first secretly buried in the village of Gornji Ribnik near Ključ on 30 November 1943. His body was exhumed in 1948 and reburied at the Tomb of People's Heroes at the Belgrade Fortress. He was posthumously proclaimed a People's Hero of Yugoslavia on 18 November 1944.

Ivo Lola Ribar became an iconic figure in post-World War II Communist Yugoslavia. Many streets, schools and factories were named after him. Croatian producer of medical supplies and sanitary products from Karlovac is named after him. A brand of scooters was named after him. The Ivo Lola Ribar Institute in Belgrade is named after him. A street in the west of Zagreb used to be named after him until 1991. when it was renamed the Baron Filipović drive. Several streets in Setbian cities such as Belgrade, Novi Sad, Bačka Palanka, Ruma, Bajmok and Croatian cities such as Rijeka, Valpovo, and again since 2009 Zagreb are named after him.

Rock band Korni Grupa released a single "Ivo Lola" in 1973 which tells a story about the last letter Ribar sent to his fiancé Sloboda Trajković.

A Gymnasium in Pristina after World War Two was named after him, now known as Sami Frashëri High School.
