= League of Socialist Youth of Yugoslavia =

Youth organization (1919–1991)

League of Socialist Youth of Yugoslavia: Savez socijalističke omladine Jugoslavije (Serbo-Croatian); Zveza socialistične mladine Jugoslavije (Slovene); Сојуз на социјалистичката младина на Југославија (Macedonian)
- Emblem

- Flag
- Founded: 10 October 1919
- Dissolved: 24 February 1991
- Headquarters: Belgrade, SFR Yugoslavia
- Membership: 3.600.000 (1983)
- Ideology: Communism; Marxism-Leninism; Titoism
- National affiliation: Socialist Alliance of Working People of Yugoslavia
- International affiliation: World Federation of Democratic Youth (until 1948)

The League of Socialist Youth of Yugoslavia (SSOJ) was the youth movement and member organisation of the Socialist Alliance of Working People of Yugoslavia (SSRNJ). Membership stood at more than 3.6 million individuals in 1983. It was originally established as the League of Communist Youth of Yugoslavia (SKOJ) on 10 October 1919 and retained that name until 1948. Although it was banned just two years after its establishment and at times ruthlessly persecuted, it continued to work clandestinely and became an influential organization among revolutionary youth in the Kingdom of Yugoslavia, and consequently became a major organizer of Partisan resistance to Axis occupation and local Quisling forces. After World War II, SKOJ became part of a wider organization of Yugoslav youth, the People's Youth of Yugoslavia, which later became the League of Socialist Youth of Yugoslavia.

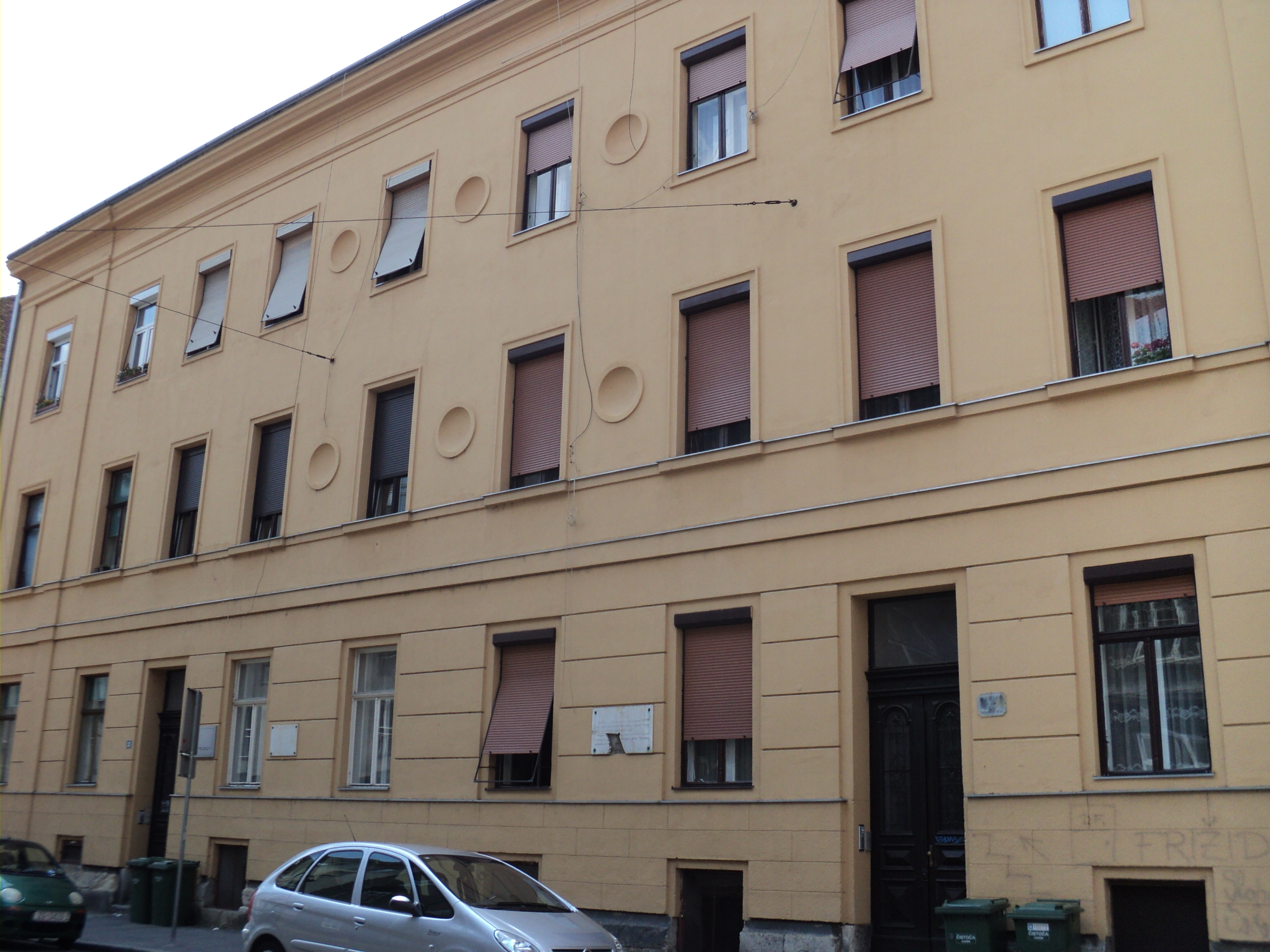
Building in Zagreb where SKOJ was founded in October 1919.

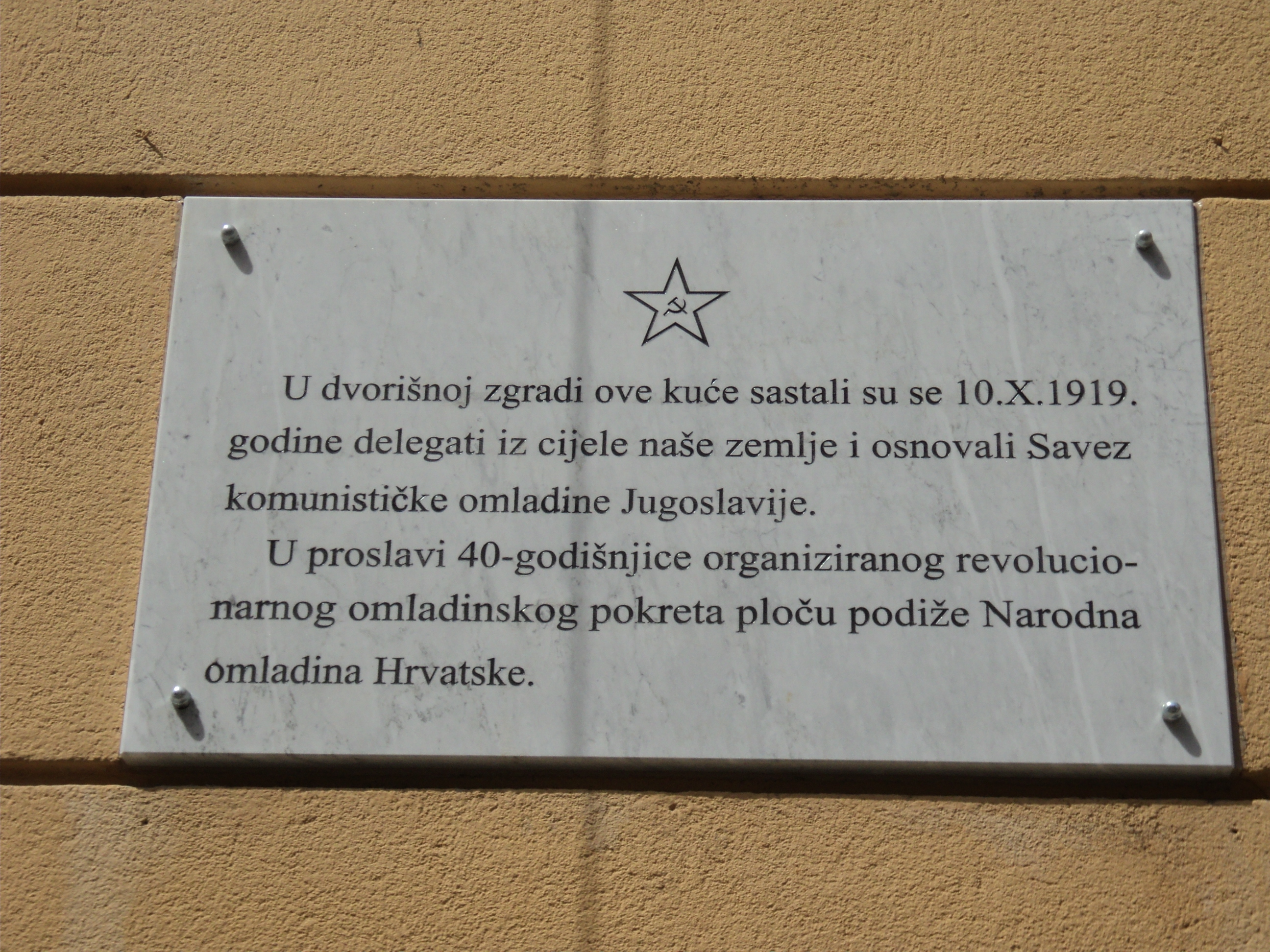
Memorial plaque on the building.

== History ==
=== Original SKOJ ===
SKOJ was founded in Zagreb on October 10, 1919, as a political organization of revolutionary youth that youth which followed the policy of the communist Socialist Workers' Party of Yugoslavia.

Regional committees were originally established, but they were abolished in 1920. In 1921, the organization was banned together with the party, which had in the meantime been renamed the Communist Party of Yugoslavia. Two congresses were held clandestinely during the 1920s, the Second Congress in June 1923, and the Third Congress in June 1926. SKOJ was affiliated with the Young Communist International. Regional committees were reestablished in 1939.

=== Seven Secretaries of SKOJ ===
Seven Secretaries of SKOJ, also known as Seven Courageous, were seven leading figures of the organization from 1924 to 1931 who died at the hands of the government, in direct confrontation with the gendarmerie, by suicide, or indirectly as a consequence of being subjugated to extremely poor conditions during imprisonment or torture, which led to their death from extreme weakening and illness. The Seven were, in the sequence of taking the role of secretary of the organization:

- Zlatko Šnajder (1903, Slavonski Brod), organisation secretary between 1924 and 1926; imprisoned 1926; while in prison he was tortured, suffering numerous beatings before he was finally released in May 1931, but died three months later of tuberculosis.
- Mijo Oreški (1905, Zagreb), organisation secretary between 1926 and 1928, and again as political secretary with Mišić as organisation secretary between January 1929 and July 1929; both were killed in a shooting exchange with the gendarmerie on 27 July 1929.
- Pavle Pajo Marganović (1904, Kovin u Vojvodini), political secretary between 1928 and April 1929; died from the consequences of torture on 30. July 1929.
- Josip Debeljak (1902, Orešje u Hrvatskom zagorju), organisation secretary between 1928 and April 1929, and again between August 1930 and October 1931; he was the last of the seven to head the organisation, and he was also killed in a shooting with the gendarmerie on 15 October 1931 in Zagreb.
- Janko Mišić (1900, Slani Dol kod Samobora), organisation secretary with Oreški as political secretary between January 1929 and July 1929; both were killed in a shooting exchange with the gendarmerie on 27 July 1929.
- Josip Kolumbo (1905, Kutjevo), political secretary with Popović as organisation secretary between July 1929 and August 1930; both committed suicide on 14 August 1930 after falling into a gendarmerie trap.
- Pero Popović Aga (1905, Užice), organisation secretary with Kolumbo as political secretary between July 1929 and August 1930; both committed suicide on 14 August 1930 after falling into a gendarmerie trap.

=== During WWII ===
After Axis powers occupied Yugoslavia in 1941, SKOJ organized a united youth front with the program of struggle against fascism and war, forming Anti-Fascist Youth Committees which at the Congress of Anti-Fascist Youth of Yugoslavia in Bihać in 1942 were united into the Unified League of Anti-Fascist Youth of Yugoslavia (Ujedinjeni savez antifašističke omladine Jugoslavije - USAOJ). SKOJ became a part of the umbrella organization, but continued to act autonomously within it.

=== Post-WWII socialist Yugoslavia ===
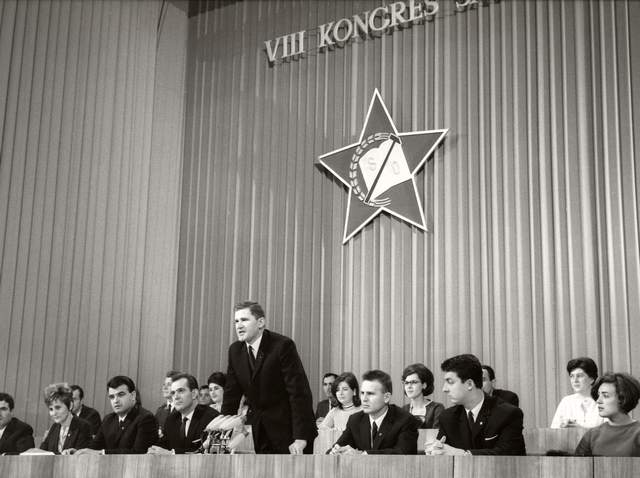
Branko Kostić speaking at the VIII Congress of the SSOJ in Belgrade in 1968

In May 1946, USAOJ was renamed People's Youth of Yugoslavia (Narodna omladina Jugoslavije - NOJ), and in 1948 SKOJ and NOJ were united into a single organization, which continued to use the name People's Youth of Yugoslavia, and the use of the name SKOJ was discontinued.

NOJ was later reorganised into the League of Socialist Youth of Yugoslavia] (SSOJ), which was founded as a merger of the League of Communist Youth of Yugoslavia and the People's Youth of Yugoslavia organizations after World War II. Membership in the organization, though not compulsory, was desirable for those wishing to pursue higher education and a career in public service, and typically began after children completed their time in the Union of Pioneers of Yugoslavia at around 14 or 15 years of age. Similarly to the party itself, the SSOJ was decentralized, and each Republic of Yugoslavia had a branch of its own. It was one of the five main government-sanctioned socio-political organizations of Yugoslavia and sent its own delegates to the Federal Assembly.

In the 1980s, attitudes within the SSOJ began to change its structure, and by the latter half of the decade it helped facilitate a network of alternative social and political opinions within the youth sphere of Yugoslavia. The organization attempted to subvert the growing threat of nationalism while following a liberal approach to social issues. The SSOJ tried to facilitate youth culture by encouraging the promotion of the arts, including literature and popular music styles. Following the dissolution of the SKJ shortly after the 14th Congress in 1990, the SSOJ was disbanded as well.

== See also ==
- League of Socialist Youth of Bosnia and Herzegovina

== Bibliography ==
- Djilas, Aleksa (1991). The Contested Country: Yugoslav Unity and Communist Revolution, 1919-1953. Harvard University Press. ISBN 978-0-674-16698-1.
- Dušan Plenča (1969). Omladinski pokret Jugoslavije 1919-1969. Mladost.
- Vojo Pekić (1959). Savez komunističke omladine Jugoslavije između dva rata (1919-1941). Izdanje Komisije za istorijat omladinskog pokreta CK NO Jugoslavije.
- Đorde Stanković (1970). Komunistička partija i Savez komunističke omladine Jugoslavije na Beogradskom univerzitetu 1929-1941. Univerzitetski odbor za proslavu 50 godina SKJ i SKOJ.
- Stanka Veselinov (1978). Savez komunističke omladine Jugoslavije i Ujedinjeni savez antifašističke omladine Jugoslavije u Vojvodini, 1941-1945. Muzej socijalističke revolucije Vojvodine.
- Kongres SKOJ-a i Narodne omladine Jugoslavije. Omladina. 1949.
- Đorđe Stanković (1970). Komunistička partija i Savez komunističke omladine Jugoslavije na Beogradskom univerzitetu 1929-1941: Spomen album fotografija. Univerzitetski odbor za proslavu 50 godina SKJ i SKOJ.
