= Bačevci =

Bačevci may refer to:

- Bačevci (Bajina Bašta), village in the municipality of Bajina Bašta, Serbia
- Bačevci (Valjevo), village in the municipality of Valjevo, Serbia
