= Bačevci (Bajina Bašta) =

Coordinates: 44°05′N 19°30′E

- Village (Selo)
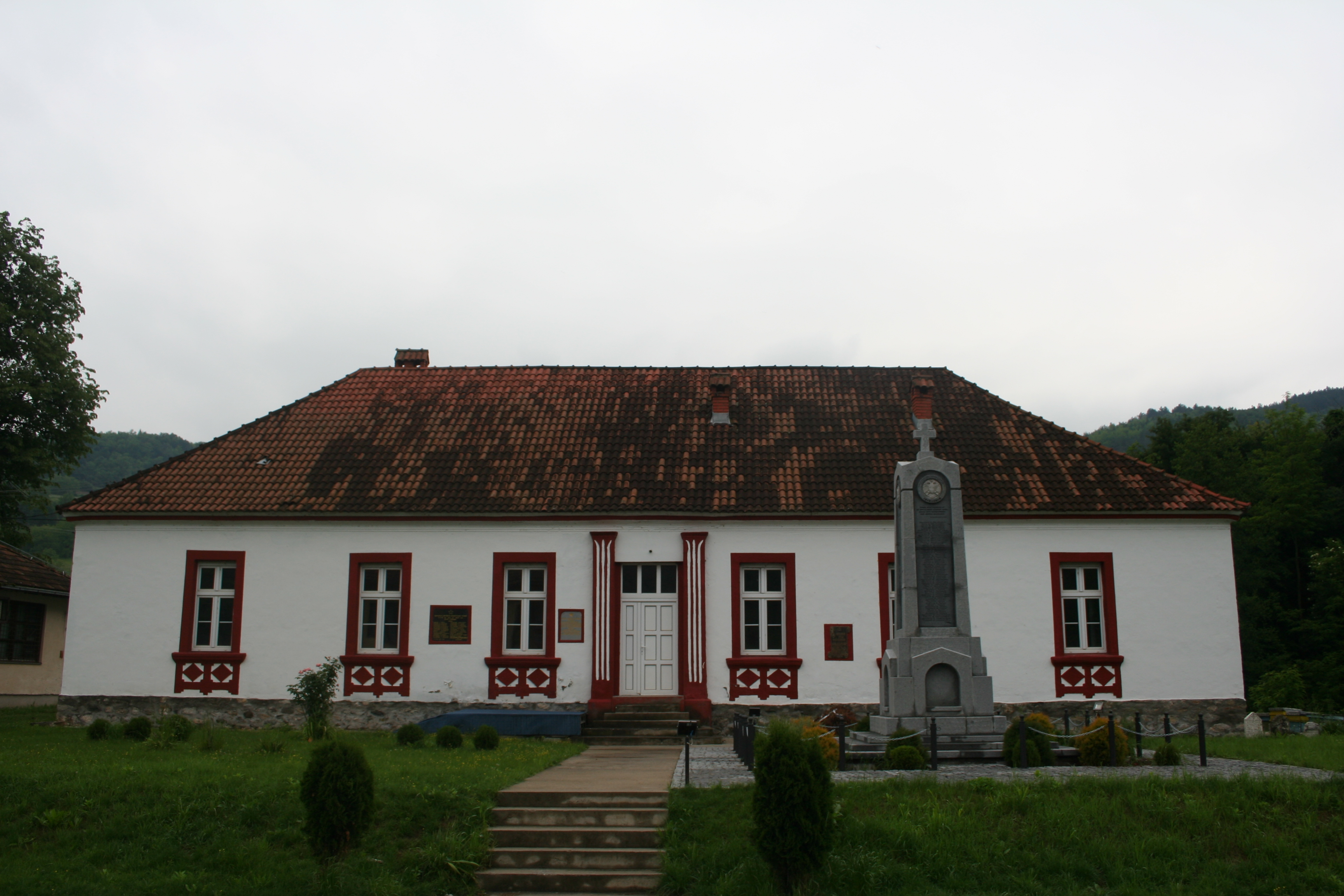
- An Old School in Bacevci
- Interactive map of Bačevci (Bajina Bašta)
- Country: Serbia
- District: Šumadija
- Municipality: Bajina Bašta

Population (2002)
  - Total: 167
- Time zone: UTC+1 (CET)
  - Summer (DST): UTC+2 (CEST)

Bačevci (Bajina Bašta) (Serbian Cyrillic: Бачевци) is a village in the municipality of Bajina Bašta, Serbia. According to the 2002 census, the village has a population of 167 people.
