= Bačevci (Valjevo) =

Bačevci Бачевци
- Village
- Location within Serbia
- Coordinates: 44°10′N 19°54′E
- Country: Serbia
- District: Kolubara District
- Municipality: Valjevo

Population (2002)
  - Total: 505
- Time zone: UTC+1 (CET)
  - Summer (DST): UTC+2 (CEST)

Bačevci is a village in the municipality of Valjevo, Serbia. According to the 2002 census, the village has a population of 505 people.

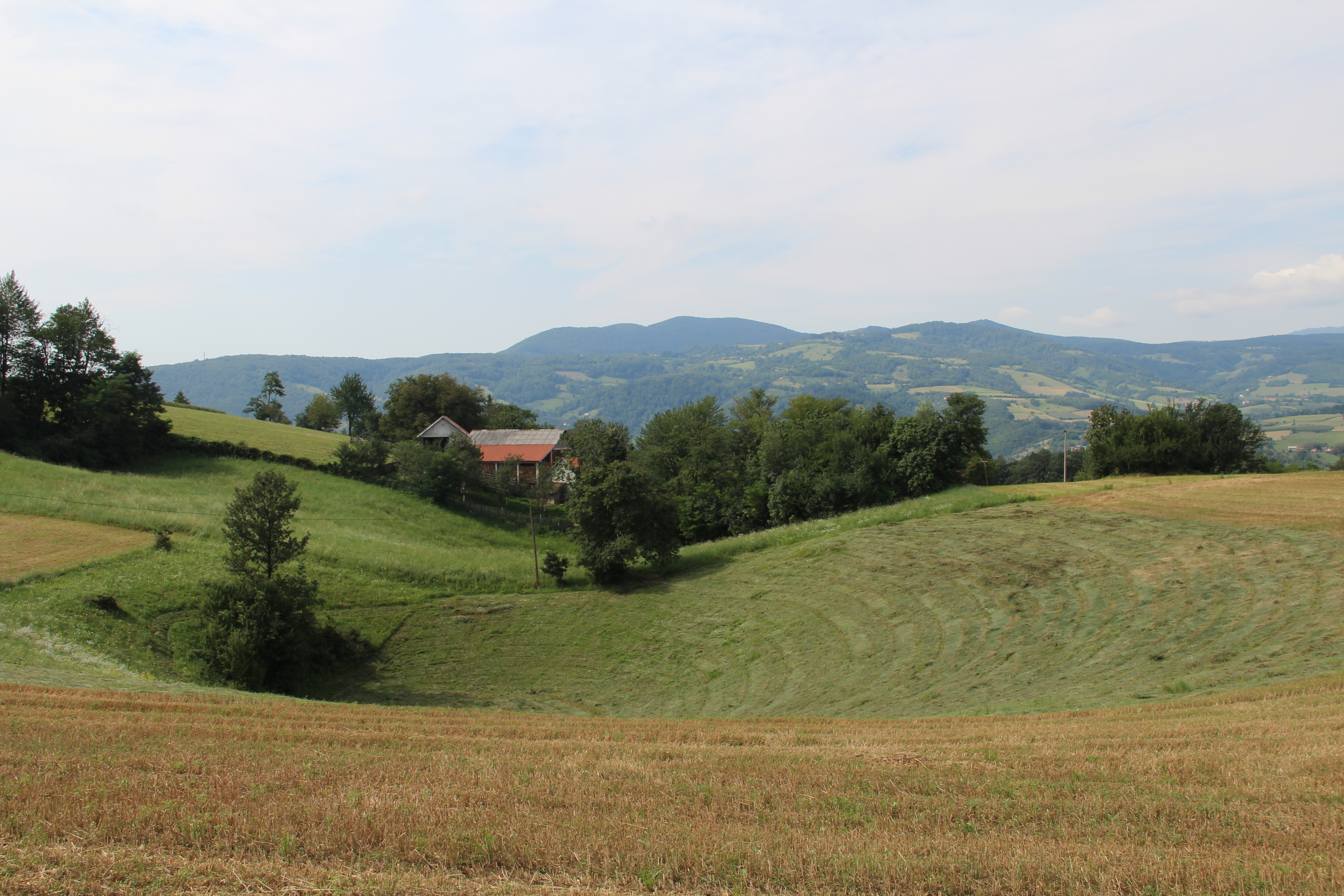
Bačevci - panorama

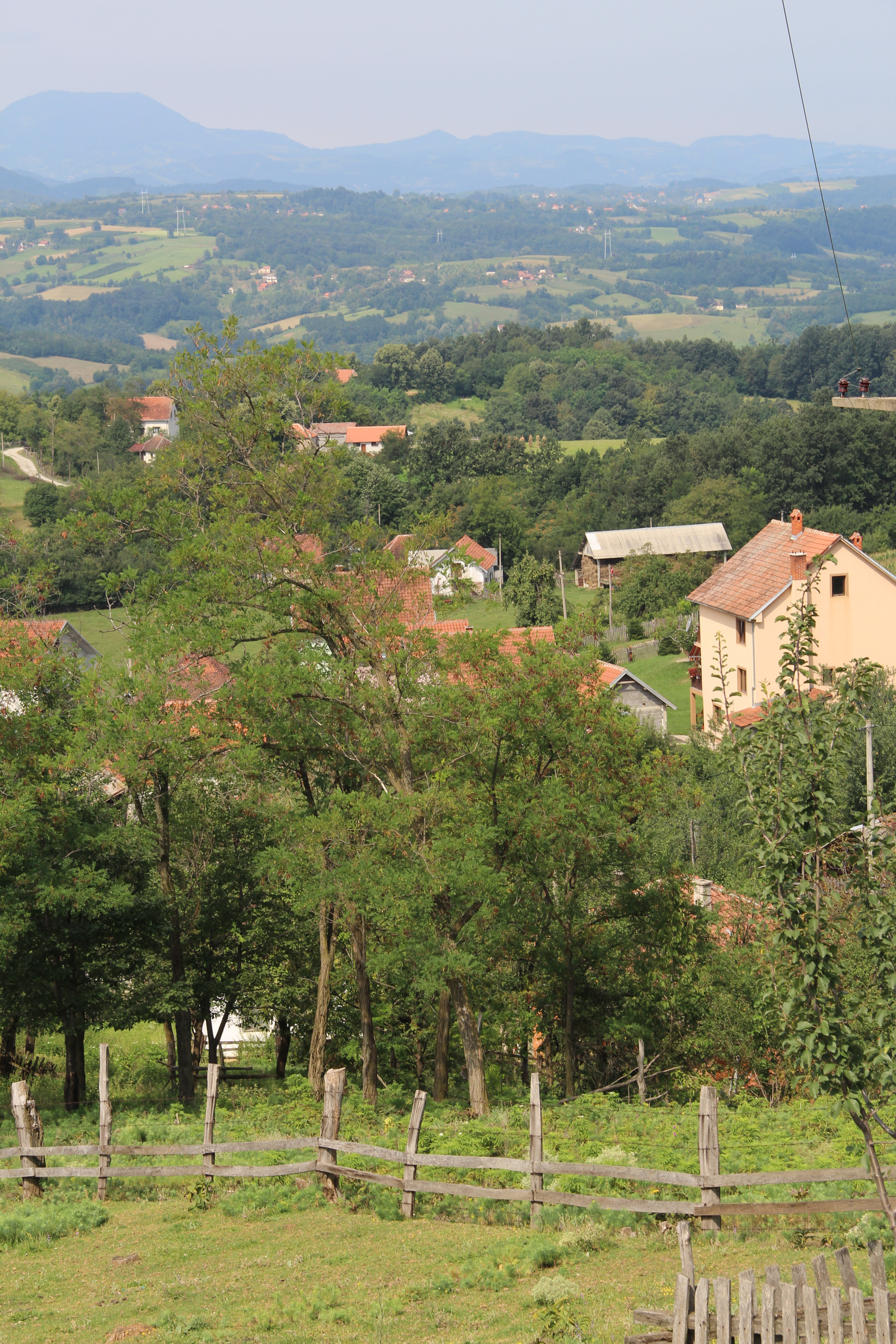
Bačevci - panorama

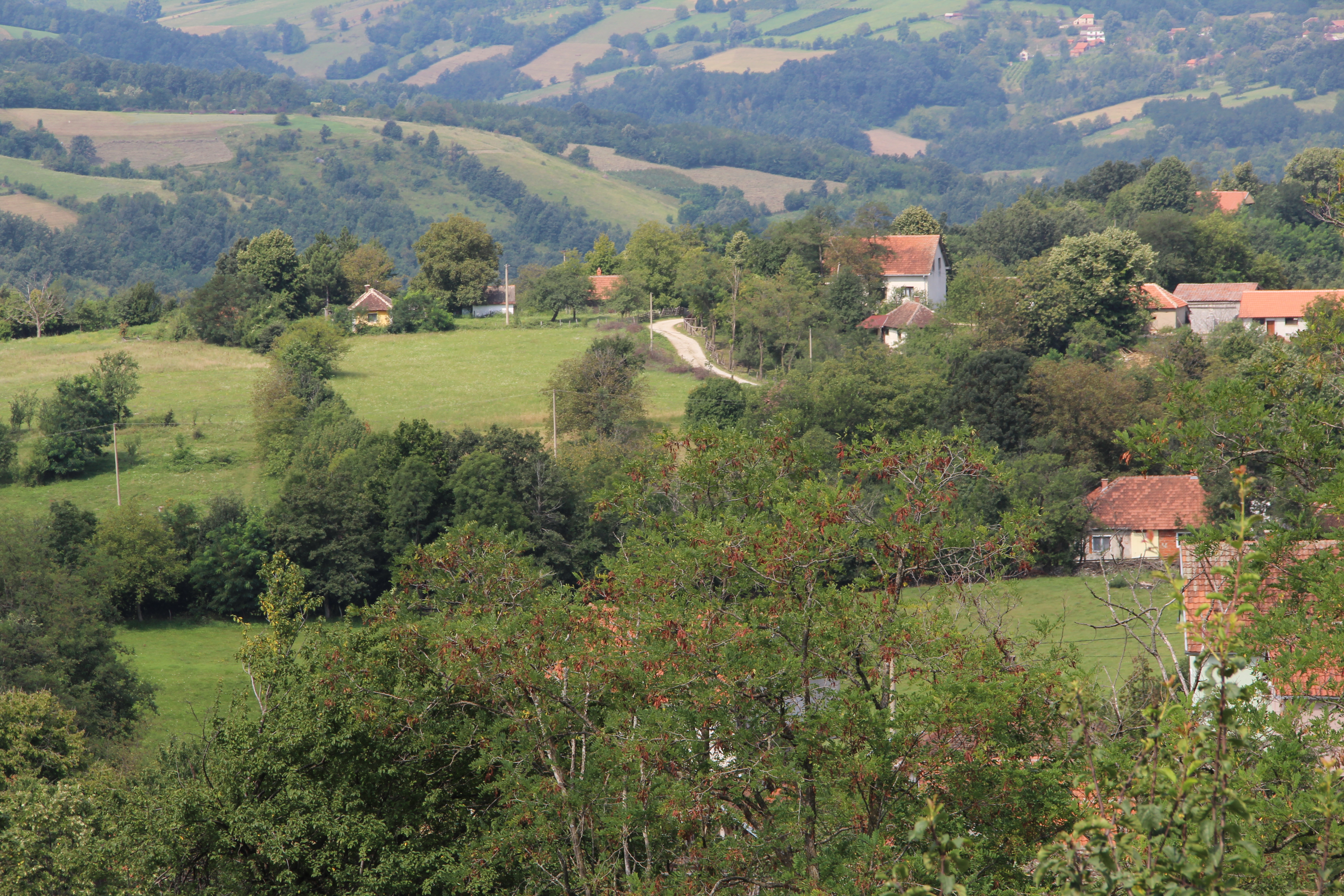
Bačevci - panorama

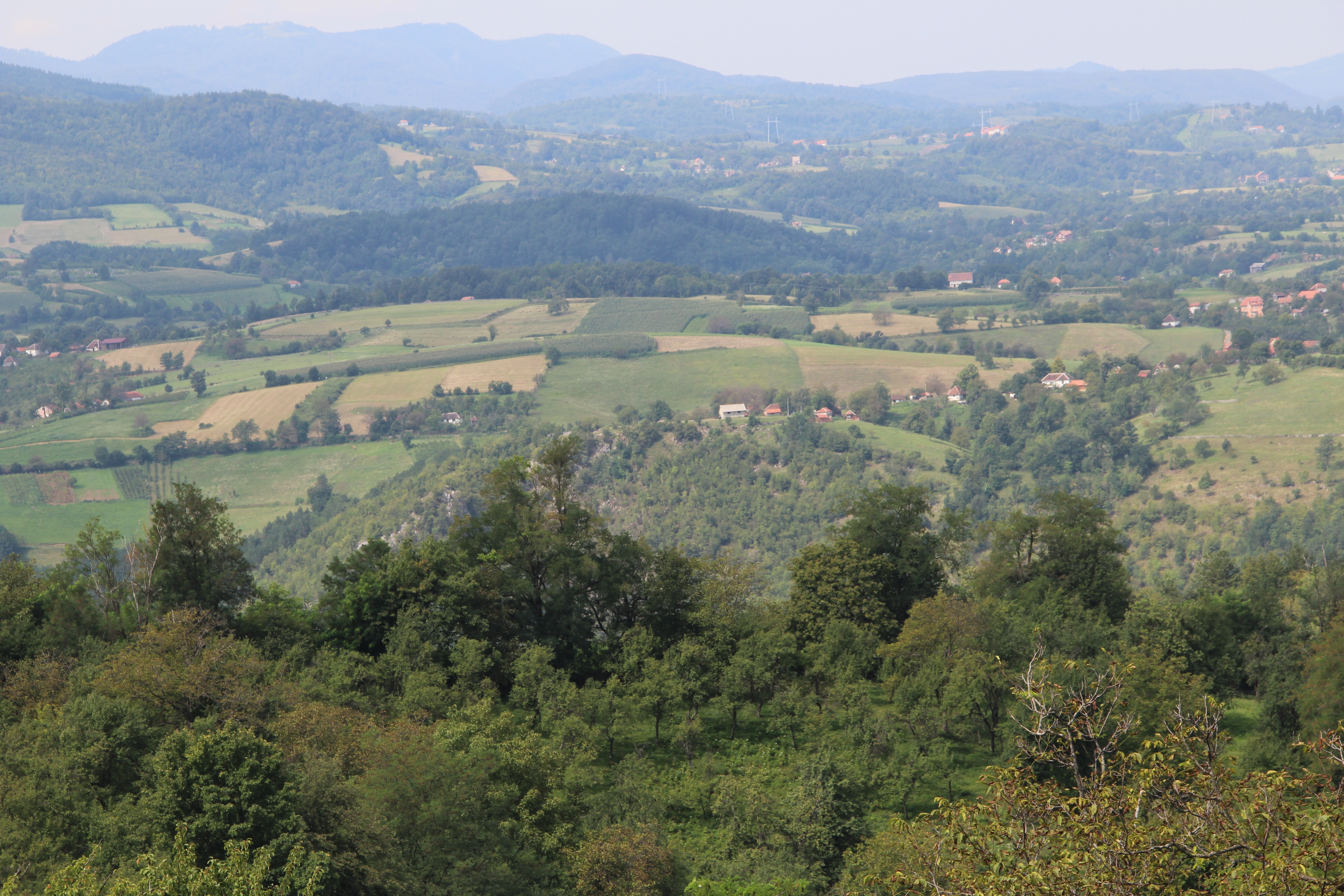
Bačevci - panorama

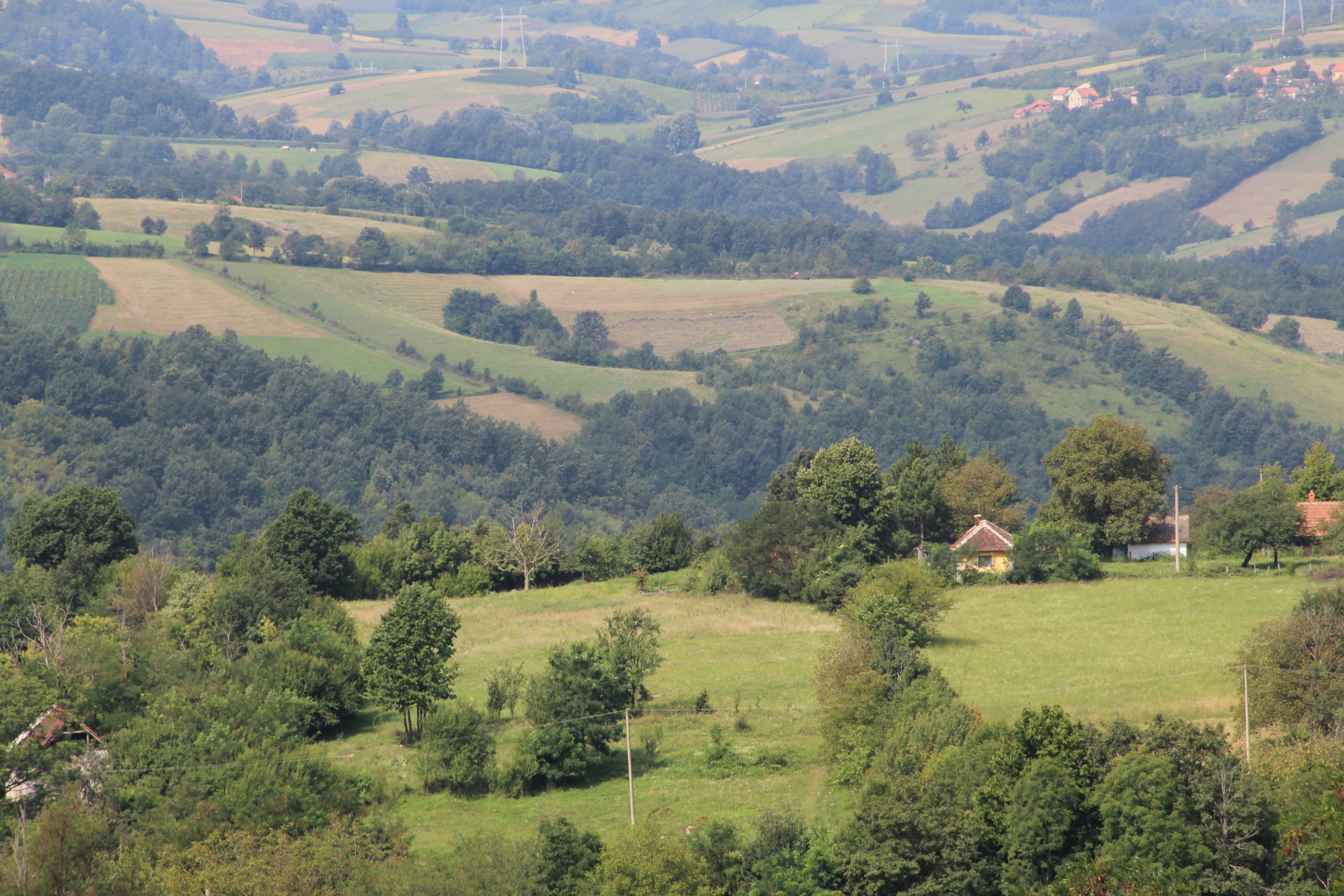
Bačevci - panorama

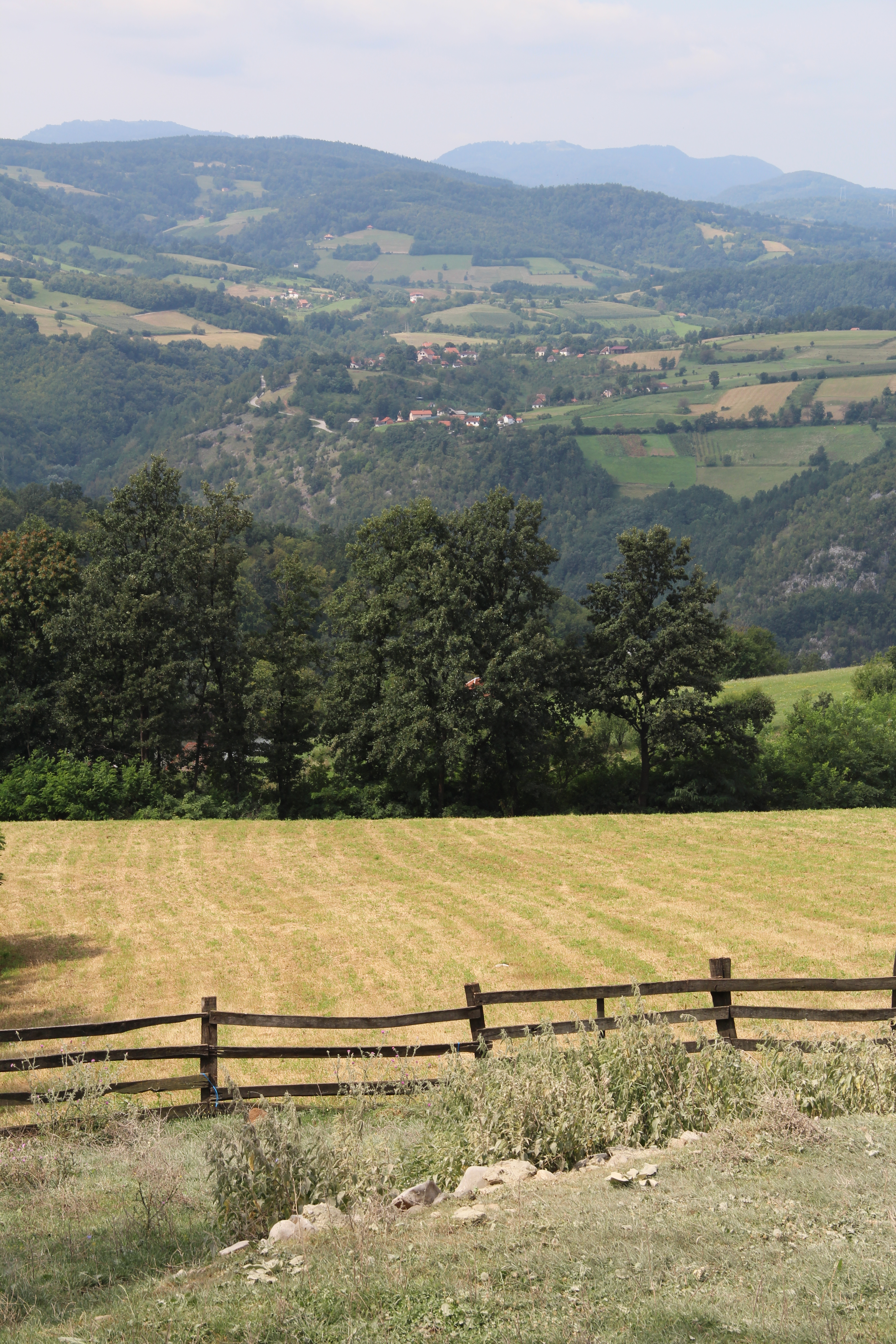
Bačevci - panorama

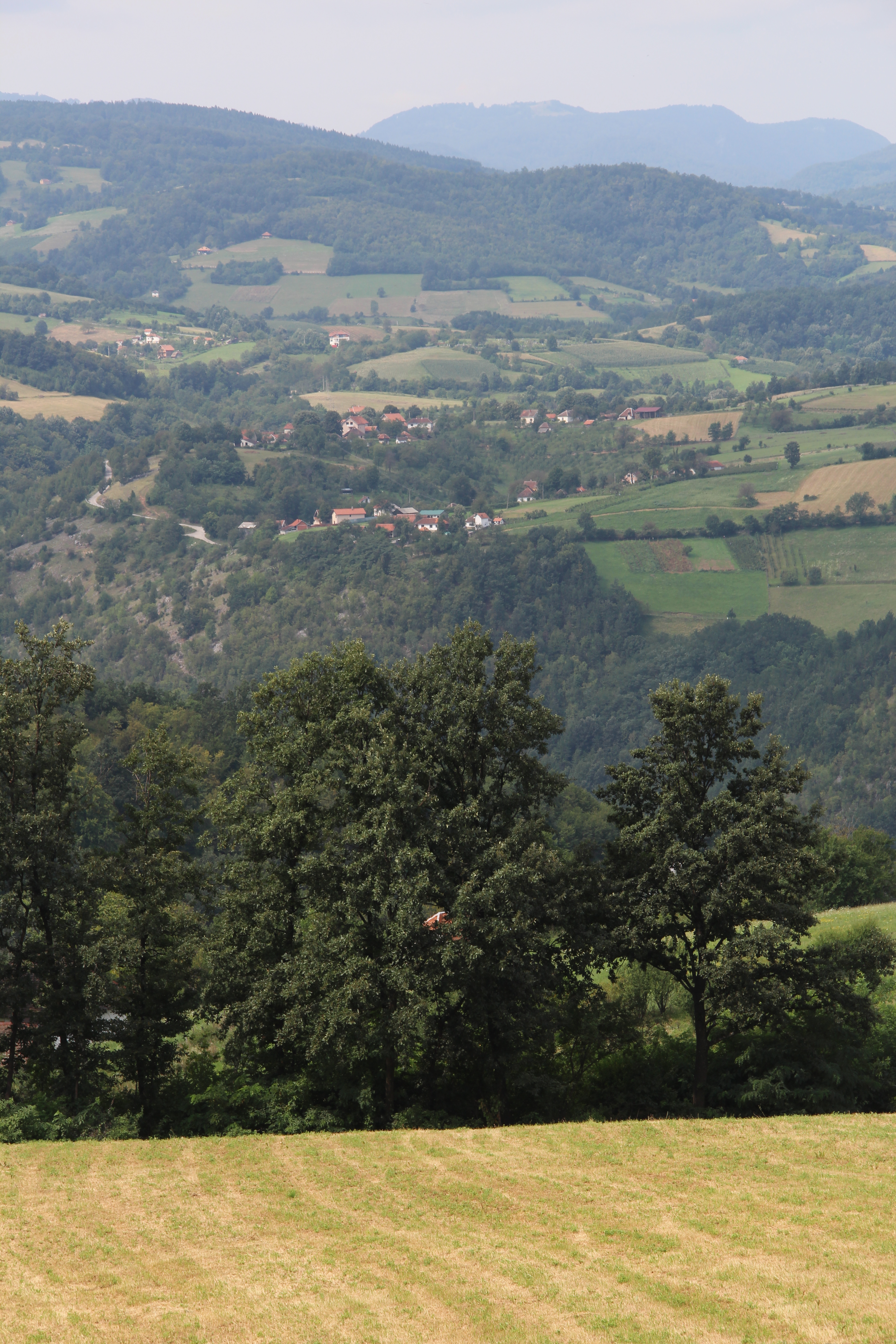
Bačevci - panorama

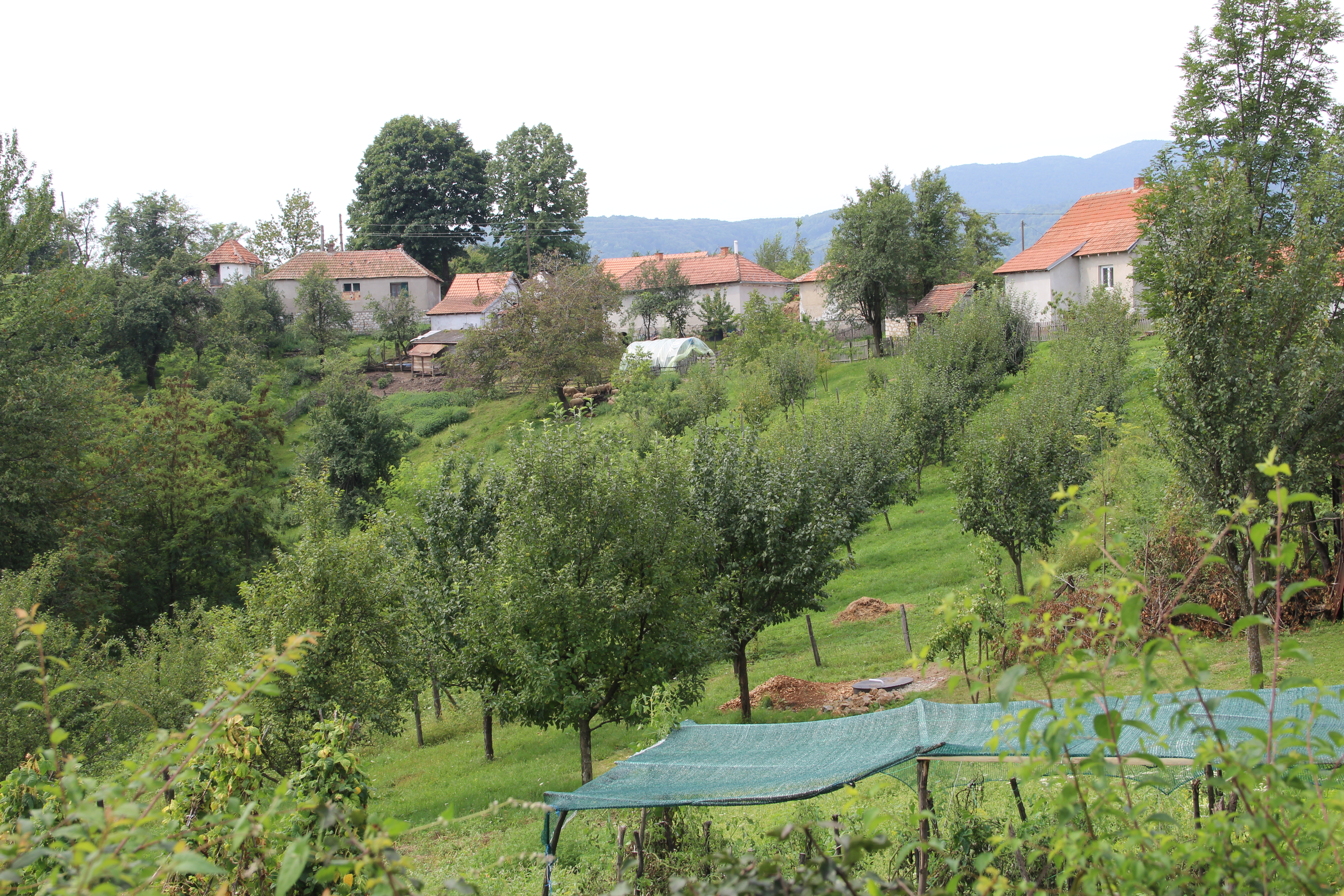
Bačevci - panorama

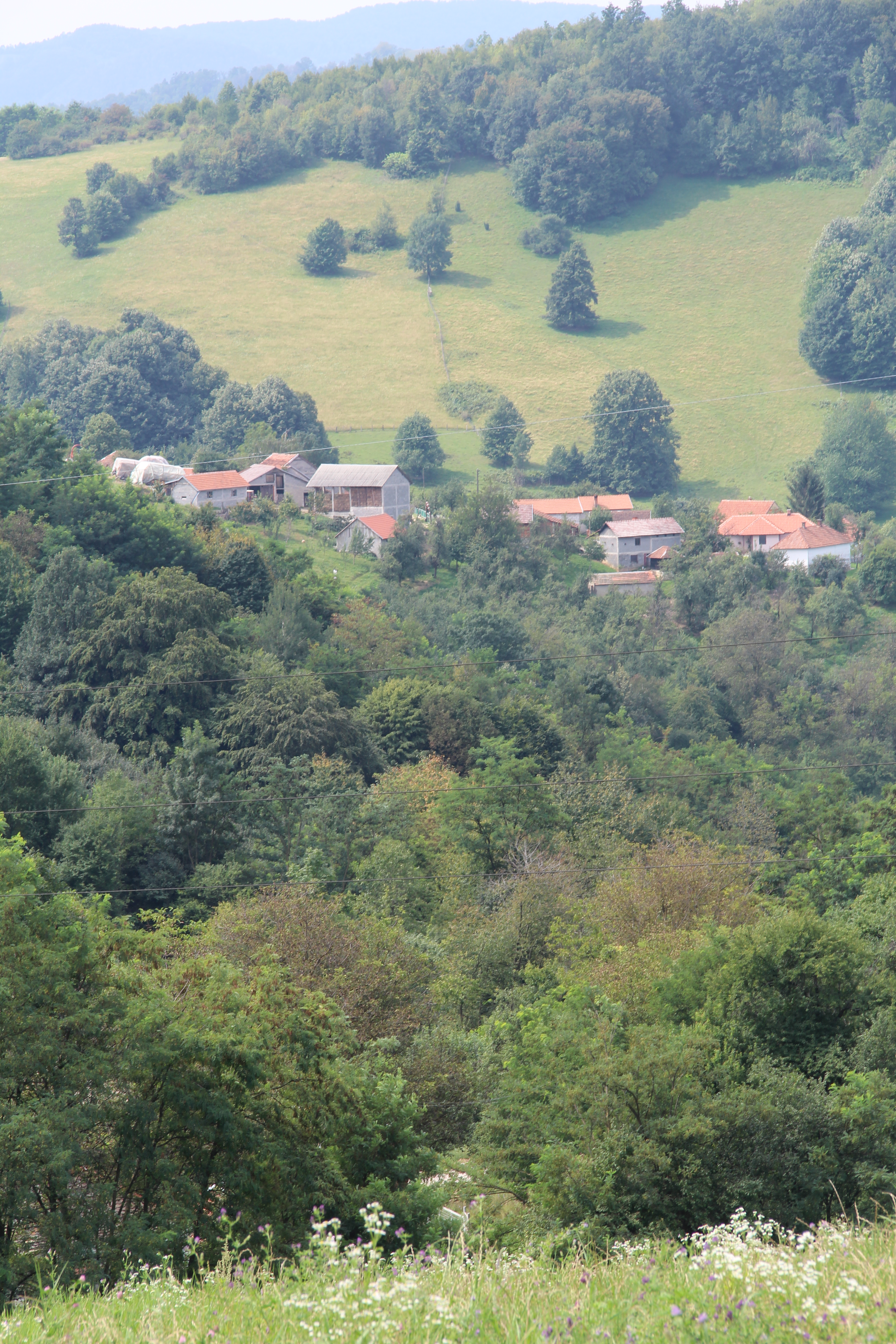
Bačevci - panorama

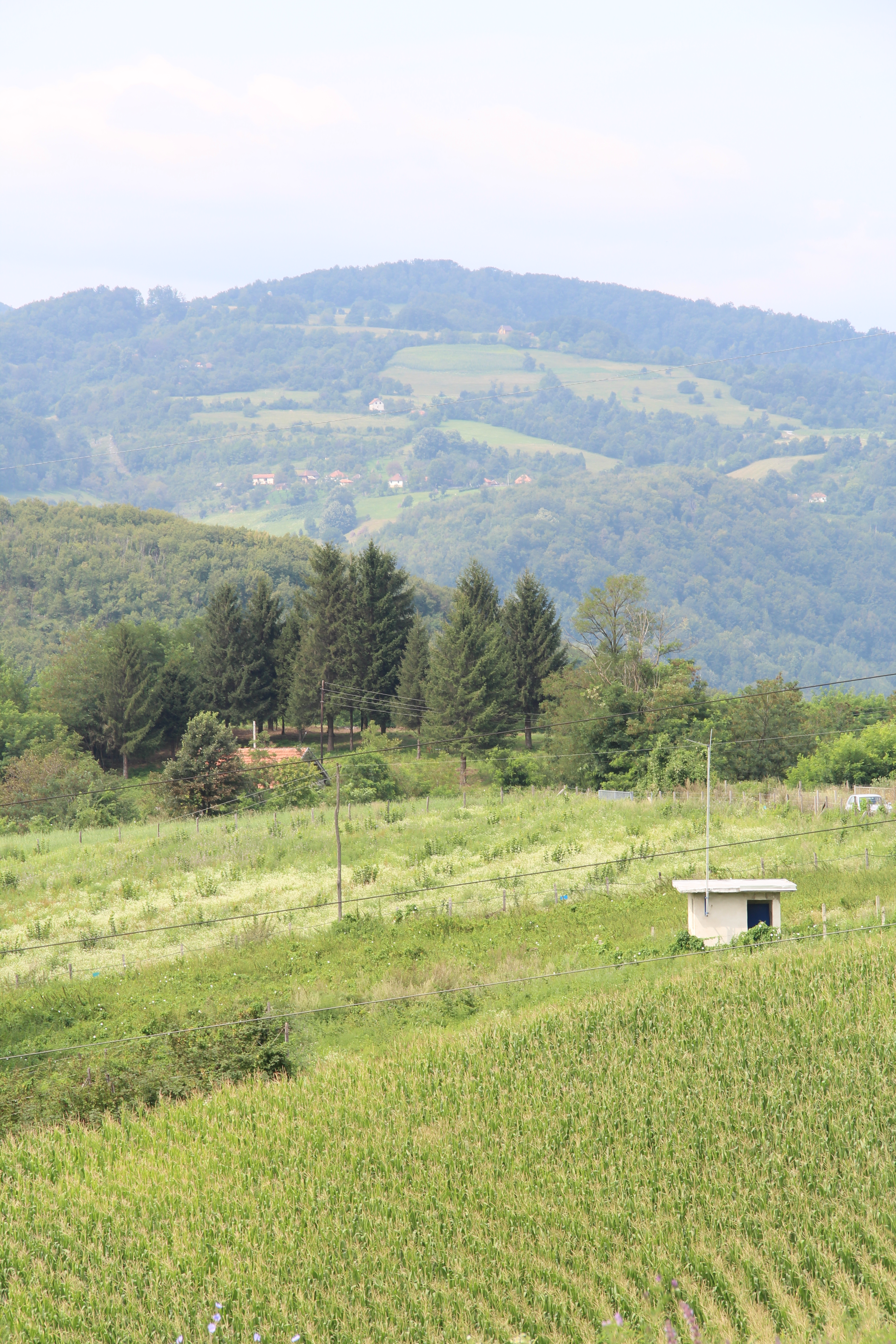
Bačevci - panorama

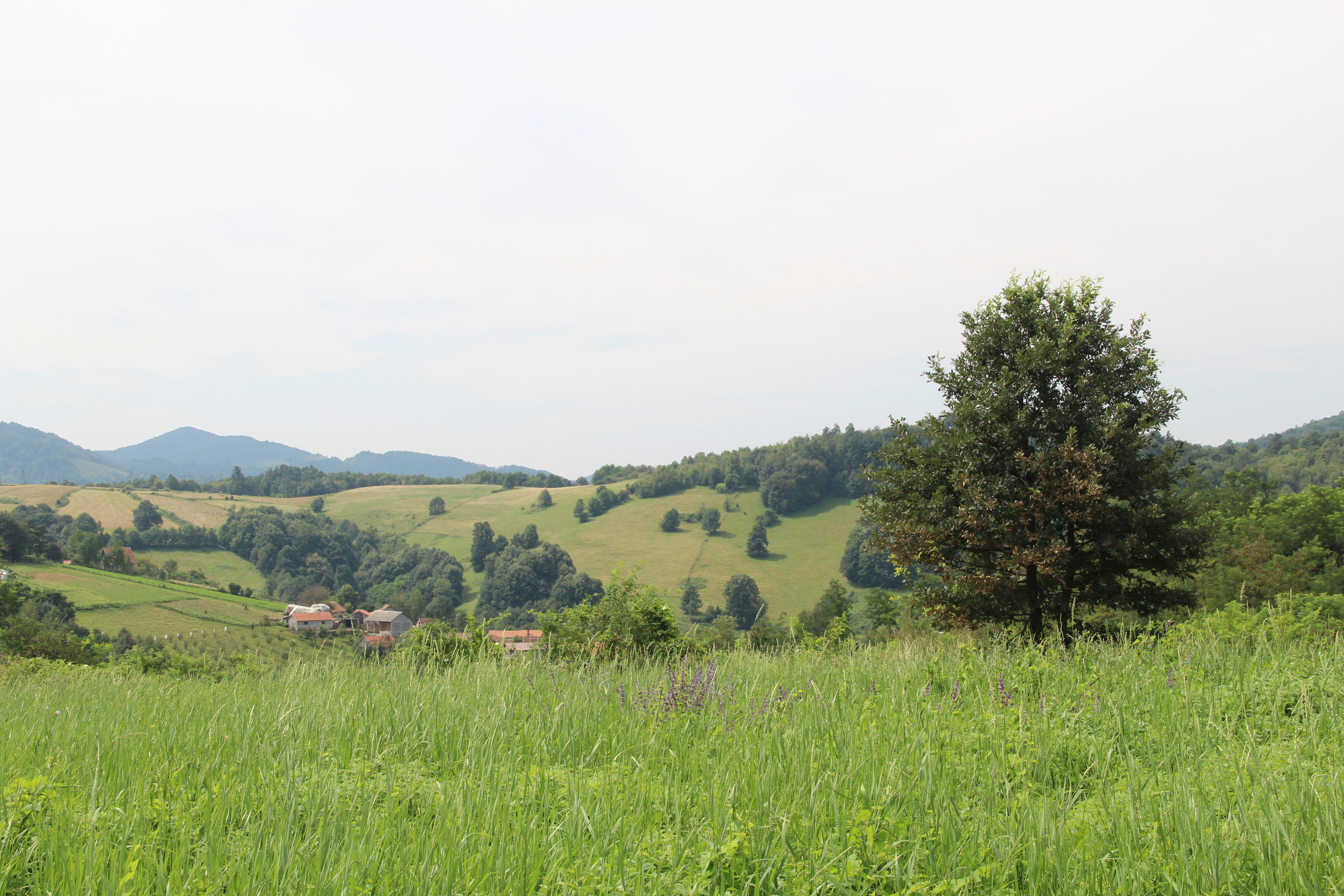
Bačevci - panorama

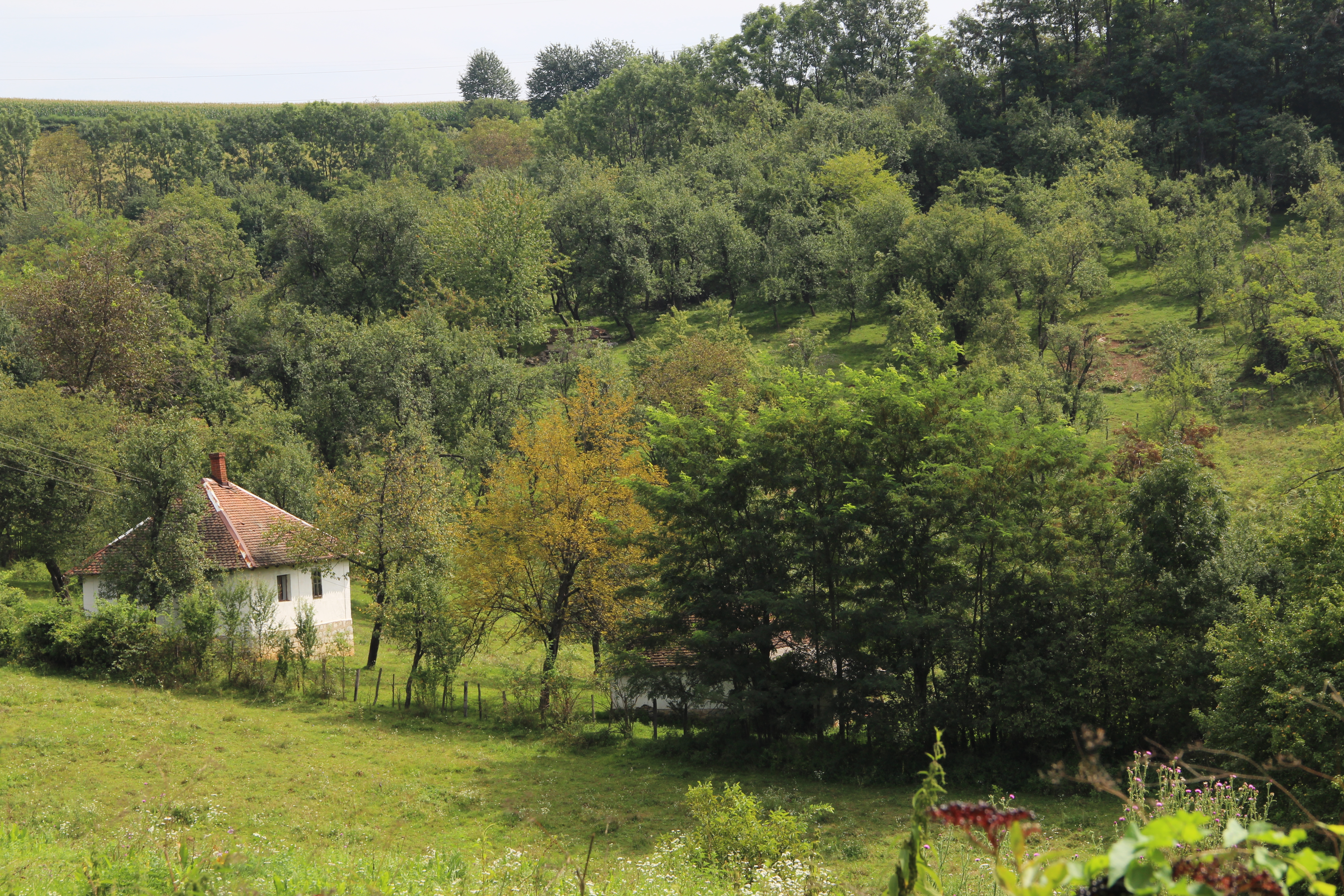
Bačevci - panorama
